= List of governors of North Sumatra =

Head of government of North Sumatera, Indonesia

Governor of North Sumatra
- Gubernur Sumatera Utara
- Coat of arms of North Sumatera

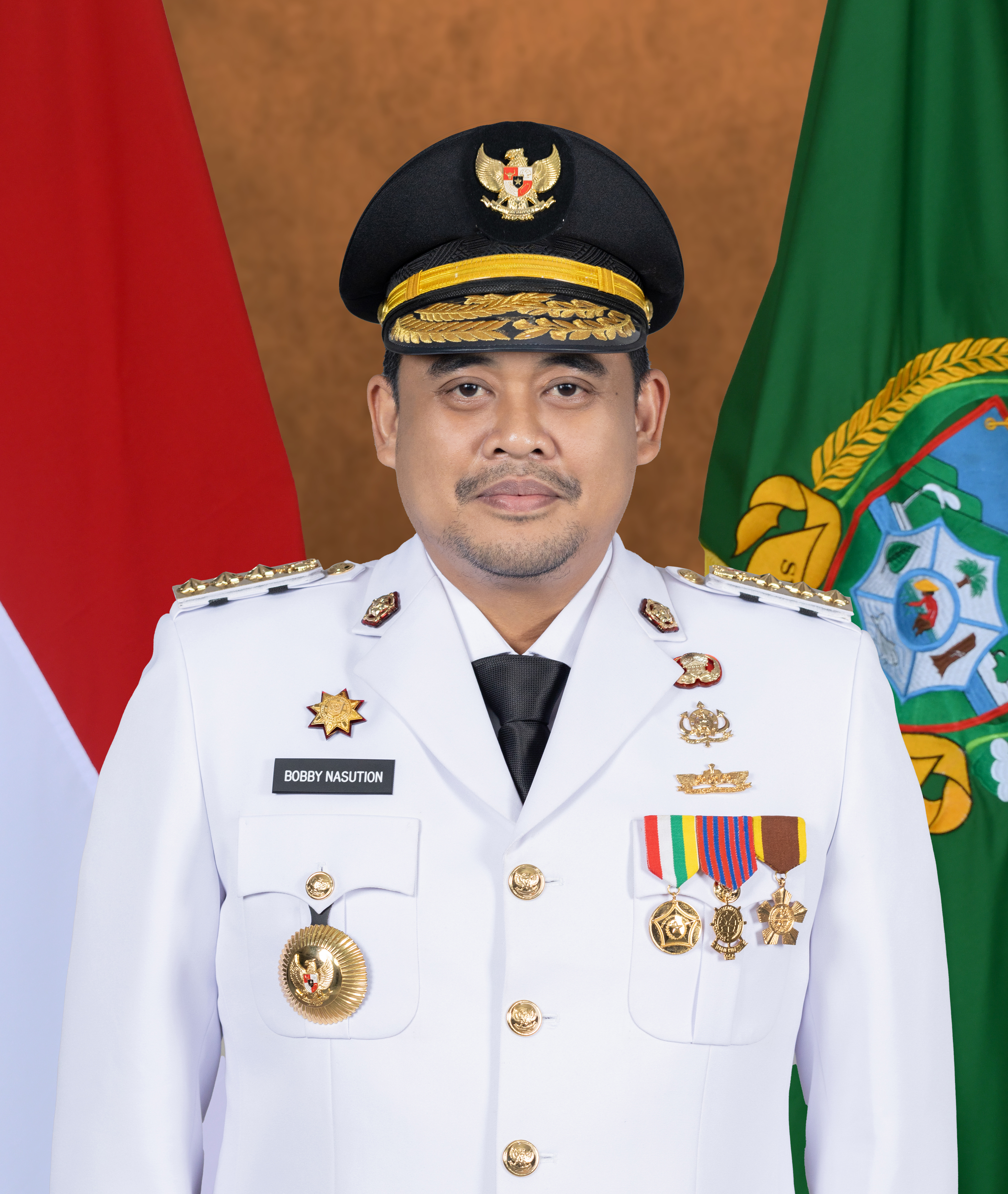
- Incumbent; Bobby Nasution since 12 February 2025
- North Sumatra Provincial Government
- Style: Mr. Governor (informal); The Honorable (formal); His Excellency (diplomatic)
- Type: Chief executive
- Status: Head of government
- Abbreviation: GONS (in English); Gub. Sumut (in Indonesian)
- Residence: Official Residence of the Governor of North Sumatra, Medan
- Seat: Medan
- Nominator: Political parties and Independent
- Appointer: Direct popular elections within North Sumatera (Note: since 2008, previously via North Sumatra Regional House of Representatives) or President
- Term length: Five years, renewable once 1 years (specifically for the acting governor)
- Inaugural holder: Sutan Mohammad Amin Nasution
- Formation: 19 June 1948; 78 years ago
- Deputy: Vice Governor of North Sumatra
- Salary: Rp3 million (US$213,17) per month
- Website: www.sumutprov.go.id

The Governor of North Sumatra (Indonesian: Gubernur Sumatera Utara) is an elected politician who, along with the vice governor and 100 members of the North Sumatra Regional House of Representatives, is accountable for the strategic government of the province of North Sumatra. Below is a list of governors of North Sumatra, one of the provinces of Indonesia, since the Indonesian independence to the present day.

This article lists governors that have ruled the Indonesian province of North Sumatra.

No.	Photo	Governor	Took office	Left office	Vice Governor	Election	Ref
1		Sutan Mohammad Amin Nasution (1904–1993)	19 June 1948	17 May 1949	None		
2		Daud Beureu'eh (as the Governor of Aceh) (1899–1987)	1 January 1950	17 August 1950	None		
2		Ferdinand Lumban Tobing (as the Governor of Tapanuli and East Sumatra) (1899–1962)	1 February 1950	17 August 1950	None		
—		Sarimin Reksodihardjo (1905–1992)	17 August 1950	25 January 1951	None		
3		Abdul Hakim Harahap (1905–1961)	25 January 1951	23 October 1953	None		
(1)		Sutan Mohammad Amin Nasution (1904–1993)	23 October 1953	12 March 1956	None		
—		Zainal Abidin	12 March 1956	25 January 1957	None		
4		Zainal Abidin	25 January 1957	1 April 1960	None	1957	
5		Raja Junjungan Lubis (1906–?)	1 April 1960	5 April 1963	Raja Syahnan	1960	
—		Eny Karim (1910–1995)	8 April 1963	15 July 1963	Raja Syahnan		
6		Ulung Sitepu	15 July 1963	16 November 1965	Raja Syahnan	1963	
—		Roos Telaumbanua (1919–1987)	16 November 1965	31 March 1967	None		
7		Marah Halim Harahap (1921–2015)	31 March 1967	31 March 1972	None	1967	
—		Marah Halim Harahap (1921–2015)	31 March 1972	4 December 1972	None		
(7)		Marah Halim Harahap (1921–2015)	4 December 1972	4 December 1977	None	1972	
—		Marah Halim Harahap (1921–2015)	4 December 1977	12 June 1978	None		
8		Edward Wellington Pahala Tambunan (1927–2006)	12 June 1978	13 June 1983	None	1978	
9		Kaharuddin Nasution (1925–1990)	13 June 1983	13 June 1988	None	1983	
10		Raja Inal Siregar (1938–2005)	13 June 1988	14 June 1993	Alimuddin Simanjuntak	1988	
10		Raja Inal Siregar (1938–2005)	14 June 1993	16 June 1998	Pieter Sibarani	1993	
11		Tengku Rizal Nurdin (1948–2005)	16 June 1998	16 June 2003	Lundu Panjaitan; Abdul Wahab Dalimunthe	1998	
11		Tengku Rizal Nurdin (1948–2005)	16 June 2003	5 September 2005	Rudolf Pardede	2003	
—		Rudolf Pardede (1942–2023)	5 September 2005	10 March 2006	None		
12		Rudolf Pardede (1942–2023)	10 March 2006	16 June 2008	None		
13		Syamsul Arifin (1952–)	16 June 2008	21 March 2011	Gatot Pujo Nugroho	2008	
—		Gatot Pujo Nugroho (1962–)	21 March 2011	14 March 2013	None		
14		Gatot Pujo Nugroho (1962–)	14 March 2013	16 June 2013	None		
14		Gatot Pujo Nugroho (1962–)	16 June 2013	4 August 2015	Tengku Erry Nuradi	2013	
—		Tengku Erry Nuradi (1964–)	11 August 2015	25 May 2016	None		
15		Tengku Erry Nuradi (1964–)	25 May 2016	9 March 2017	None		
15		Tengku Erry Nuradi (1964–)	9 March 2017	16 June 2018	Nurhajizah Marpaung		
—		R. Sabrina (Acting)	16 June 2018	22 June 2018	None		
—		Eko Subowo (Acting)	22 June 2018	5 September 2018	None		
16		Edy Rahmayadi (1961–)	5 September 2018	5 September 2023	Musa Rajekshah	2018	
—		Hassanudin (Acting)	5 September 2023	24 June 2024	None		
—		Agus Fatoni (Acting)	24 June 2024	20 February 2025	None		
17		Bobby Nasution (1991–)	5 September 2018	5 September 2023	Surya	2024	
