= 1967 North Sumatra gubernatorial election =

Election for the Governor of North Sumatra

← 1963	February 6, 1967	1972 →
- Turnout: 97.4%
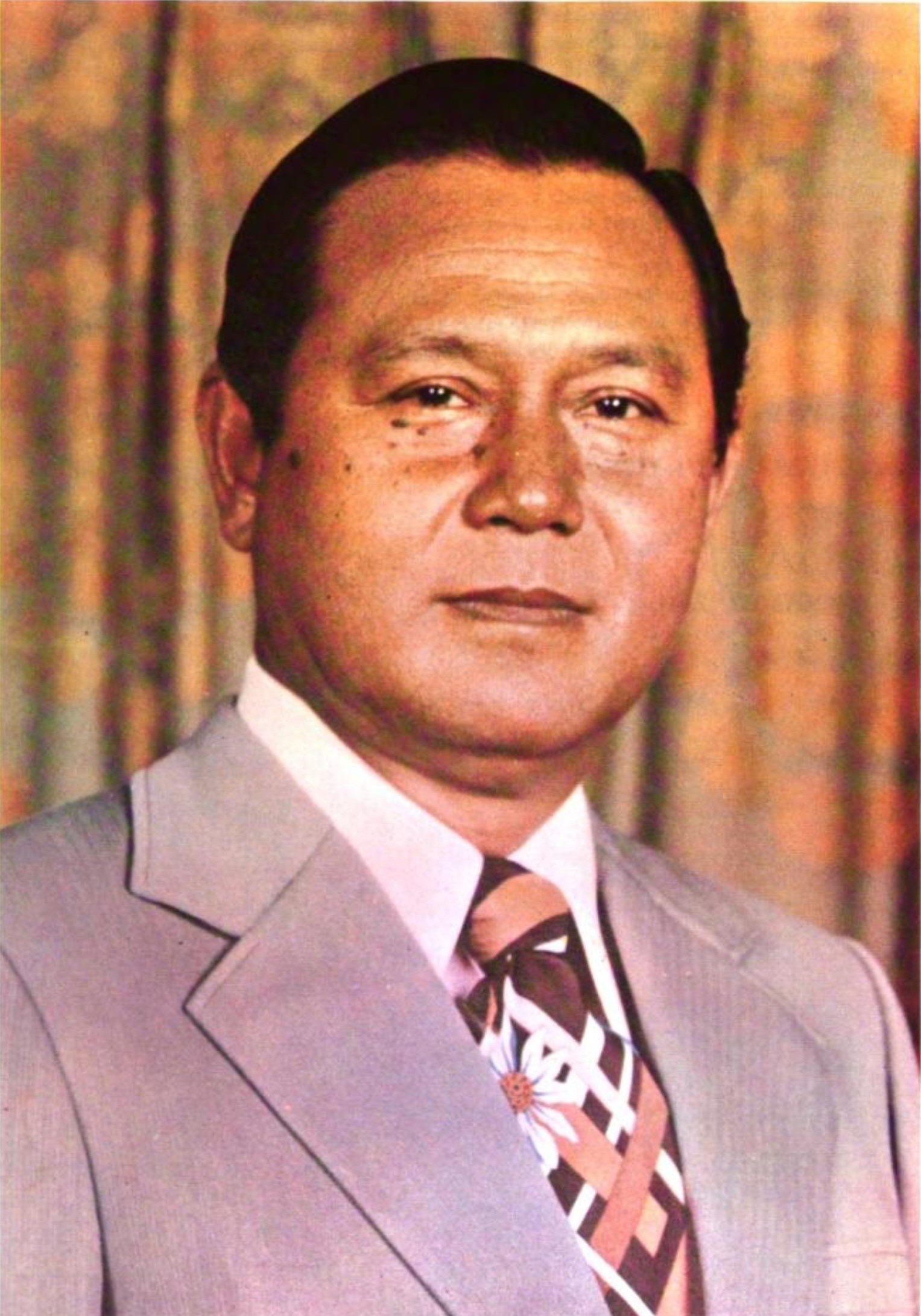

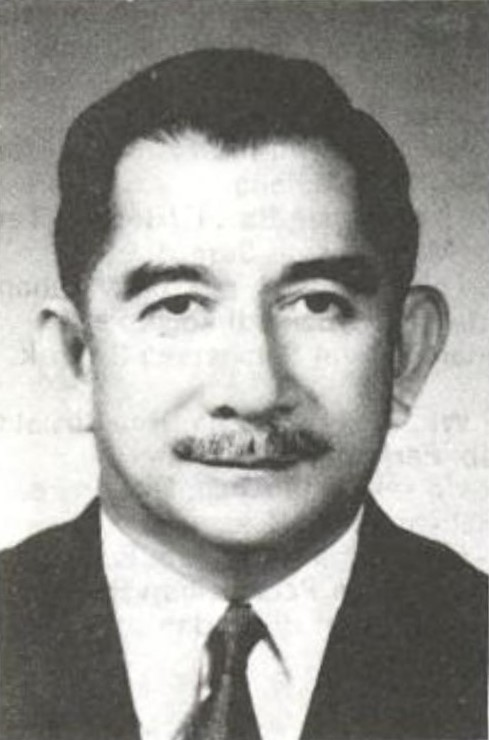
Candidate	Marah Halim Harahap	Roos Telaumbanua
Party	Golkar	Indonesian Christian Party
Electoral vote	24	14

The 1967 North Sumatra gubernatorial election was an indirect election held to elect the Governor of North Sumatra for the 1967–1972 term. All members of the Regional People's Representative Council of North Sumatra were eligible to vote for this election. It resulted in incumbent acting governor Roos Telaumbanua being defeated by military officer Marah Halim Harahap.

== Background ==
Following the 30 September Movement, the pro-communist governor Ulung Sitepu was ousted from office and former Mayor of Medan Roos Telaumbanua was sworn in as acting governor of North Sumatra on 16 November 1965. The Regional People's Representative Council of North Sumatra then began preparations to elect a governor.

== Nomination of candidates ==
In a meeting on 11 January 1967, the chiefs of the four branches of the armed forces—Commodore Hotma Harahap, Brigadier General P. Sobiran, Police Brigadier General Sumampouw, and Commodore Sudjatmiko—issued a joint statement declaring their refusal to nominate any candidates for the election, and handed over the task to the people.

The first list of candidates was announced by the Regional Secretary of North Sumatra, Christian Lumbangaol. Lumbangaol announced an unofficial list of candidates for the election, which consisted of Roos Telaumbanua, Tumpal Dorianus Pardede, P. Sobiran, Manaf Lubis, and Radja Sjahnan. He also stated that the Regional People's Representative Council of North Sumatra would submit the official candidates for the general election at its session on 24 January.

On 20 January, the list of possible candidates for the election was announced by the Antara news agency. The list was similar to the previous list, with the addition of new names such as L. Noor Nasution, Aminuddin Azis, Djamaluddin Tambunan, Marah Halim Harahap, Nelang Sembiring, Hotman Sitompul, Lahiradja Munthe, and Napitupulu.

Political parties began announcing their candidates on 24 January. The Golkar party nominated Marah Halim Harahap, the Indonesian Christian Party nominated Roos Telaumbanua, the Indonesian National Party nominated Tumpal Dorianus Pardede, and the Muslim parties in the council nominated Abdul Manaf Lubis. Seven days later, on 31 January, the Pancasila Front from Simalungun formally nominated Radjamin Purba, Regent of Simalungun, for the governorship.

The official list of candidates for governor was announced on 2 February at the session of the council. The council nominated Harahap, Telaumbanua, and Pardede for the office. Harahap was supported by 15 members, Telaumbanua by 9 members, and Pardede by four members from the Indonesian National Party. Eleven members did not show any support for the candidates but stated that they would participate in the election.

== Election ==
=== Withdrawal of Pardede ===
During the election, the Indonesian National Party decided to withdraw Pardede's name from contention. It was later discovered that the withdrawal was due to the unfavorable situation surrounding the party, and that the party considered Pardede's concept of self-reliant economy for his gubernatorial term inappropriate in the current situation.

=== Results ===
Candidates	Parties	Votes	Percentage
Marah Halim Harahap	Golkar	24	61.5%
Roos Telaumbanua	Indonesian Christian Party	14	35.9%
Abstain		1	2.6%
Total		39	100%

== Aftermath ==
=== Telaumbanua affair ===
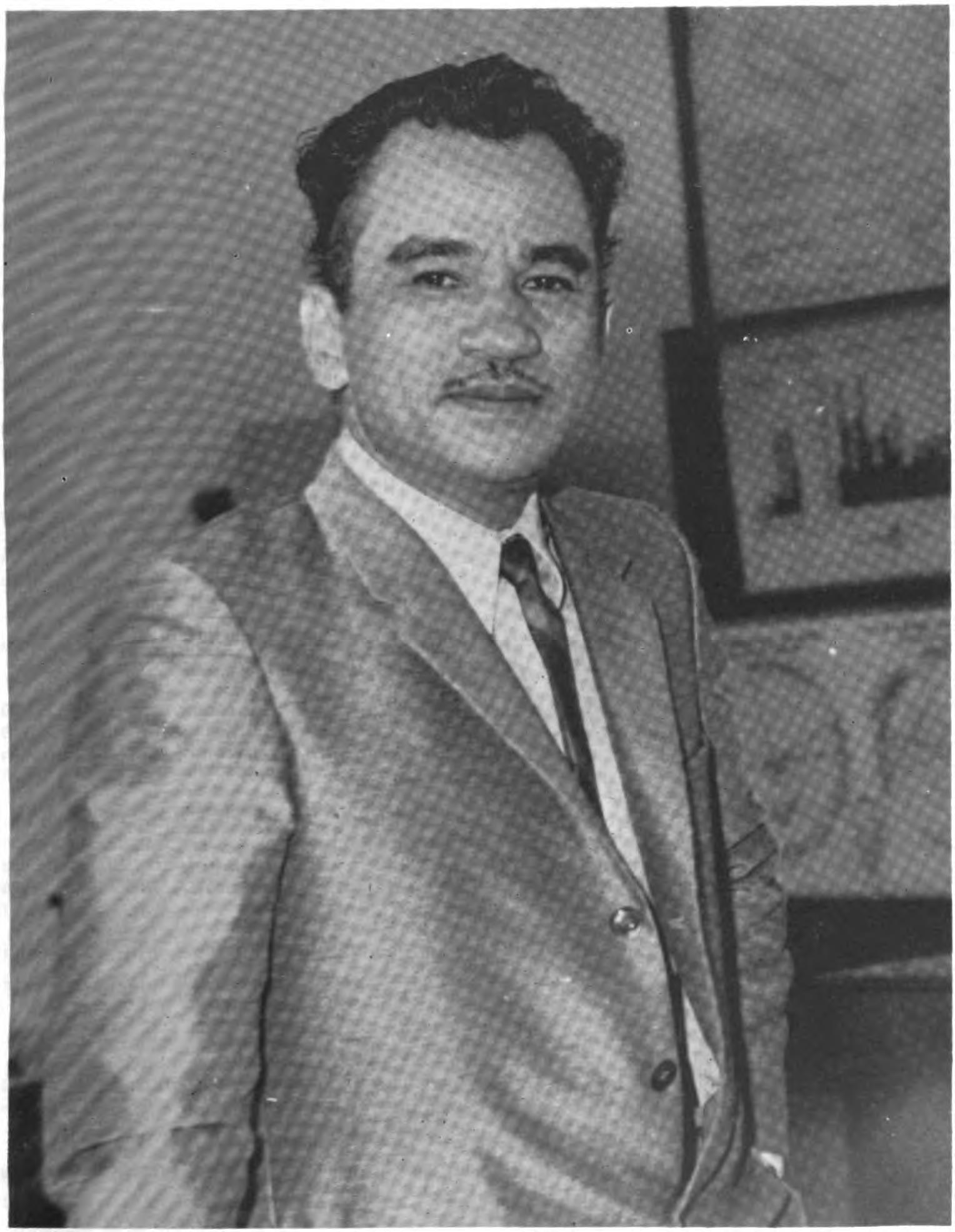
M. Sipahutar was accused of election fraud

The newspaper Proklamasi accused the Head of the North Sumatra Public Works Department, M. Sipahutar, of tampering with the election by holding a secret meeting at his house before the vote. The newspaper claimed the meeting was held to influence the Indonesian National Party to support Telaumbanua. The newspaper also maintained that Sipahutar's "dishonest practices" in the past would be uncovered should Harahap be elected as governor, and that Sipahutar was a member of the banned Communist Party of Indonesia.

On 27 February, representatives from the Christian and Catholic Party visited Basuki Rahmat, Minister of Internal Affairs, in his house. Both representatives presented evidence to the minister that suggested election irregularities. The representatives considered the election undemocratic. Rahmat responded by expressing satisfaction with the evidence and stated that he had had no prior knowledge about the irregularities.

Following these developments, the Duta Masjarakat newspaper stated that accusations of election fraud were absurd and unfounded. The same response was delivered by the commander-in-chief of the 1st Military Regional Command/Bukit Barisan, P. Sobiran, and chairman of the council, J. H. Hutauruk.

On 24 March, two Nias people and a Medan reporter were arrested for submitting a false report regarding the election which accused Chief Prosecutor Djuang Harahap of pressuring council members so that Harahap would win the election. The newspaper Api Pantjasila later coined the term "Telaumbanua affair" for this incident. A weekly named several reporters as being involved in this affair. The accused reporters issued a joint statement stating their innocence. One of the reporters, Zakaria S. Piliang from the Sinar Revolusi newspaper, stated that he was prepared to be shot if he was found guilty.

=== Inauguration ===
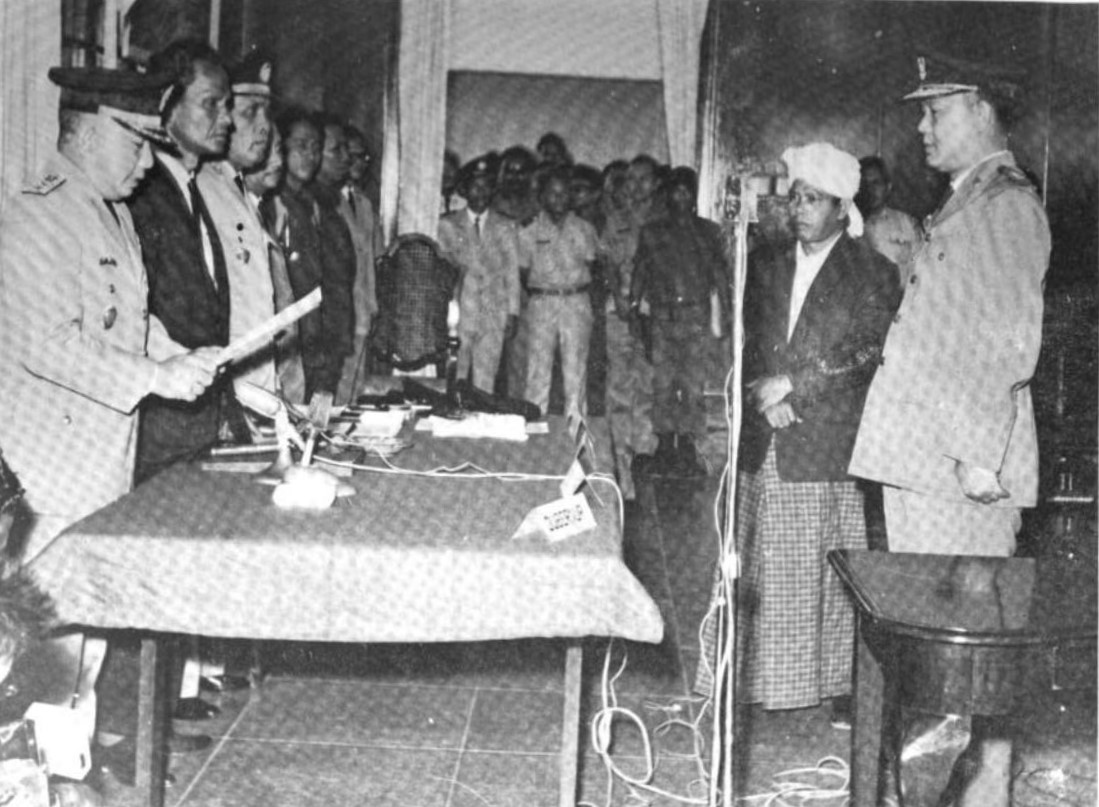
Inauguration of Marah Halim Harahap as Governor of North Sumatra on 30 March 1967

Following Harahap's victory in the election, the Ministry of Internal Affairs announced that Harahap would be inaugurated as the Governor of North Sumatra by Achmad Arnold Baramuli on 2 March 1967. On that date, the ministry postponed the inauguration ceremony to 4 March. The ministry explained that the postponement was due to technical difficulties and was not politically motivated. However, as of 8 March, no inauguration had been conducted.

Responding to the postponement, the Action Committees (Komite Aksi) stated that the inauguration should be conducted as soon as possible and that the power vacuum inside the Government of North Sumatra would cause political and economical difficulties. The Muslim Workers' Union (SARBUMUSI) released a statement requesting the inauguration of Harahap to be conducted immediately. Pressure from different groups regarding the delayed inauguration received a response from the council, which stated that the legislature has been trying to inaugurate Harahap as soon as possible.

On 13 March, P. Sobiran told visiting Action Committees leaders that according to information from Colonel Lopulisa, who was then in Jakarta, the Minister of Internal Affairs had confirmed that Harahap would be inaugurated after the special session of the People's Consultative Assembly. On 21 March, the Minister of Internal Affairs stated that the inauguration would be conducted between 23 March and 25 March.

On 28 March, Suwagio and Sjarifuddin from the Ministry of Internal Affairs arrived in Medan to make preparations for the installation of Harahap. Sunandar Prijosudarmo, Director General of Public Administration and Regional Autonomy of the Ministry of Internal Affairs, arrived in Medan the next day to install Harahap. The inauguration was conducted on 30 March 1967, with Sunandar swearing in Harahap.

=== Telaumbanua's attempt as vice governor ===
After Telaumbanua lost the elections, the Indonesian Christian Party nominated Telaumbanua for vice governor. This nomination was not approved by the Ministry of Internal Affairs, and sparked protests from the Ansor Youth Movement and the Youth Action Committee in North Sumatra.
