= Radjamin Purba =

Indonesian military officer

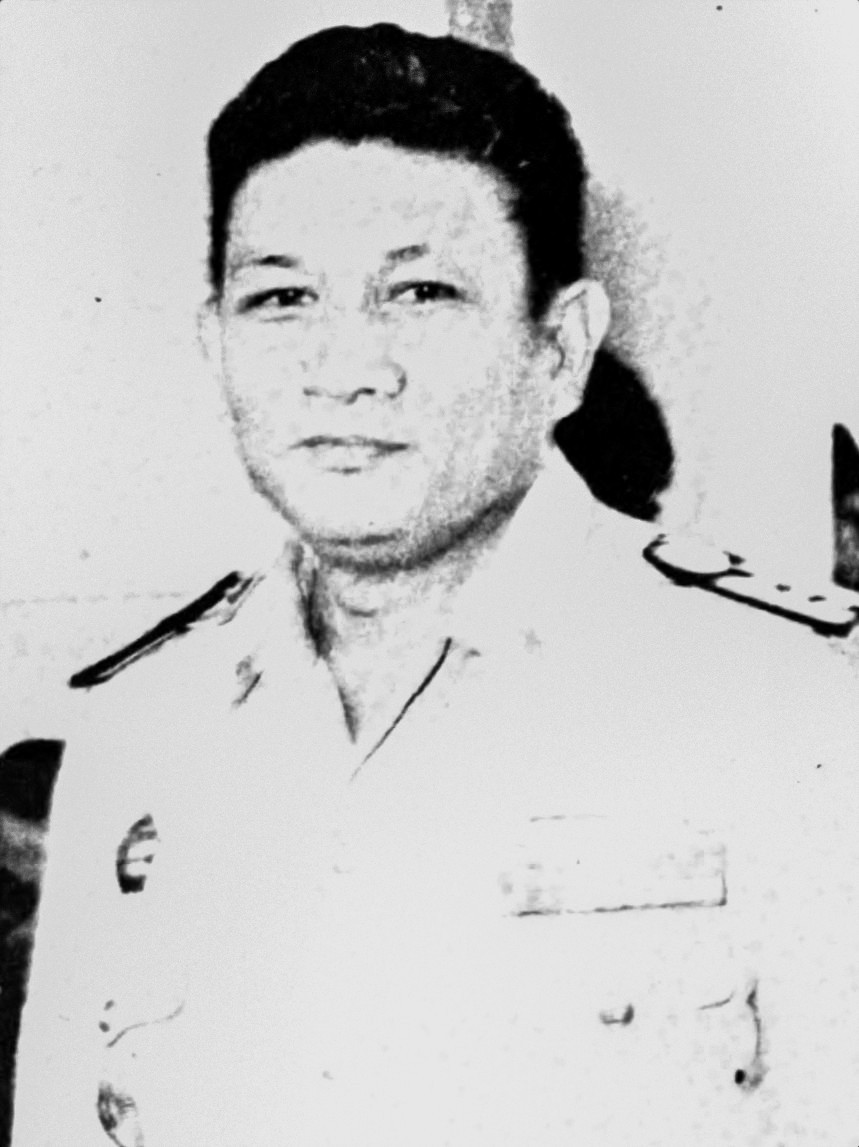

Regent of Simalungun
- In office 15 July 1960 – February 1973
- President: Sukarno; Suharto
- Governor: Raja Junjungan Lubis; Ulung Sitepu; Marah Halim Harahap
- Preceded by: Djamaluddin Tambunan
- Succeeded by: T. P. R. Sinaga

Personal details
- Born: 22 December 1928 Bangun Purba, Simalungun, Dutch East Indies
- Died: 16 February 1977 (aged 48) Jakarta, Indonesia
- Resting place: Kalibata Heroes' Cemetery
- Spouse: Nana Kencana (m. 1958)
- Parent(s): Djaingon Purba; Romainta boru Saragih
- Awards: Guerilla Star

Military service
- Allegiance: Indonesia
- Years of service: 1945–1977
- Rank: Brigadier General
- Battles/wars: Indonesian National Revolution

Radjamin Purba (22 December 1928 – 16 February 1977) was an Indonesian military officer and politician who served as the Regent of Simalungun from 1960 until 1973.

== Early life and career ==
Radjamin Purba was born on 22 December 1928, at Bangunpurba, a small village in Haranggaol, Simalungun. He was born as the son of Djaingon Purba and Rosmainta Saragih.

== Military career ==
During the Japanese occupation of the Dutch East Indies, Purba worked as an employee in the government's office on Pematangsiantar. Following the Proclamation of Indonesian Independence, Purba resigned from his job and entered the fledgling armed forces of Indonesia with the rank of first lieutenant. A year later, in 1946, Purba was sent on a trip to study at the Military Academy in Jogjakarta. Two year later, he graduated from the academy, and became the member of a program to reduce the size of the army by retaining only professional soldiers.

In November 1949, Purba became a liaison officer for Sumatran affairs in Yogyakarta. At the same time, he was also appointed as the member of the Central Joint Board for prisoner of war affairs. After the end of the Indonesian National Revolution, Purba was appointed as a military officer which handled personalia affairs.

Following the implementation of the Re-Ra policy (Reorganization and Rationalization), Purba was demoted to Second Lieutenant in 1951. He was promoted to First Lieutenant in 1953 when he enrolled in the Military Law Academy. He graduated from the academy in 1956 with the rank of Captain and a law degree. He moved to Sumatra, and became a staff in the Regional War Authority of North Sumatra. He briefly became an officer at the Indonesian Army Law Service before being assigned to the post of the Regent of Simalungun.

== Regent of Simalungun ==
=== Inauguration ===
On 15 July 1960, Radjamin Purba was inaugurated as the Regent of Simalungun by Raja Junjungan Lubis, the Governor of North Sumatra at that time. His term was intended to end in 1966, but due to the crisis caused by the 30 September Movement, his term was extended until 1967.

By the mid-1967, an election for the new Regent was held by the Regional People's Representative Council of Simalungun. The council unanimously voted for Radjamin Purba to serve his second term. Purba was inaugurated on 26 August 1967 by Marah Halim Harahap.

== Later life and death ==
In February 1973, Purba's second term ended, and he was replaced by Colonel T.P.R. Purba. He moved to Jakarta, where he became the Inspector of the Headquarters for the Ministry of Internal Affairs. During an interview conducted by Lieutenant Colonel Mailan Damti Purba, Radjamin Purba stated that he wanted to dedicate his retirement life for the development of the Simalungun University.

At 03.00 on 16 February 1977, Radjamin Purba died in Jakarta after suffering a heart attack following his trip from Bandung. The news of his death quickly spread to Simalungun. The members of the Partuha Maujana gathered and requested the central government in Jakarta to bury Radjamin Purba's body in Pematangsiantar. The central government refused to fulfill the request and buried him at the Kalibata Heroes' Cemetery.

The burial ceremony was done on 17 February 1977, and Radjamin Purba was posthumously promoted from Colonel to Brigadier General.

== Legacy ==
Several buildings were named after Purba. A sports venue constructed in 2002 and a hall in the Simalungun University was named after him. The university also erected a full body statue of Purba in May 2012. The street in front of the university was also named after him.

== Personal life ==
Purba was married to Nana Kencana, a West Javanese aristocrat, in 1958. The marriage resulted in six children, namely Budi Raja Manggala, Darmayanti, Pandu Manap Radja, Suhaerani, Kurniaty, and Adi Radjadiningrat.

Purba was a Protestant Christian.

== Awards ==
Guerrilla Star and 11 other awards

== Bibliography ==
- Purba, M.D. (1985), "Adat Perkawinan Simalungun (Mengenang Bupati Rajamin Purba SH dan Guru Jason Saragih)", Bunga Rampai Simalungun, 3, Medan
- Damanik, Erond L. (May 2018), Potret Simalungun Tempoe Doeloe: Menafsir Kebudayaan Lewat Foto (PDF), Medan: Tim Simetri Institute, ISBN 978-602-50158-5-4
- Ministry of Information (1977), Daftar Alamat Pejabat-Pejabat Negara 1976/1977, Jakarta: Publishing Directorate of the Ministry of Information
