= Parlagutan Simanjuntak =

Toba Bataknese politician and bureaucrat (1933-1967)

Drs. Parlagutan Simanjuntak

Regent of North Tapanuli (Acting)
- In office 9 November 1966 – 27 November 1967
- Governor: Pandita Roos Telaumbanua; Marah Halim Harahap
- Preceded by: Elam Sibuea
- Succeeded by: A. V. Siahaan (Acting); Mangaradja Sinaga

Regent of Dairi (Acting)
- In office 5 November 1965 – 31 March 1966
- Governor: Pandita Roos Telaumbanua
- Preceded by: Raja Nembah Maha
- Succeeded by: Soemardi

Personal details
- Born: 27 April 1933 Sidikalang, Dutch East Indies
- Died: November 27, 1967 (aged 34) Sidikalang, Indonesia
- Spouse: Sondang Lumbantobing
- Children: Hotma Yunita; Carolina Sanggul; Ivan Doli; Rudy Aryanto

Drs. Parlagutan Simanjuntak (27 April 1933 – 27 November 1967) was a Toba Bataknese politician and bureaucrat who served as the acting Regent of Dairi, Indonesia from 1965 until 1966 and as the acting Regent of North Tapanuli from 1966 until 1967.

== Early life ==
Parlagutan Simanjuntak was born on 27 April 1933 in the small town of Sidikalang. He was born as the son of Renatus Simanjuntak as the first of his three children.

Parlagutan finished his high school studies at the Medan High School Section B in 1952, and continued his studies at the Service Course C in Medan for civil servants in 1953.

== Career ==
After he graduated from the course, he began his career as a civil servant in the office of the Governor of North Sumatra, and from there he became a mantri (expert staff) in the office of the Regent of Deli Serdang. He resigned in 1954 to pursue his studies at the Faculty of Social Political Science in the Gadjah Mada University until 1957.

After his graduation from the university, he worked as an employee in the Office for Student Education in the Ministry of Internal Affairs from 1957 until 1959. Since 1 September 1959, he was employed to as an ahli praja (city expert) in the office of the Governor of North Sumatra, and in 1960 he was moved to the office of the Resident of East Sumatra.

In September 1961, after following a stringent selection test, he was selected by the First Minister of Indonesia at the time, Djuanda Kartawidjaja, to study in the Faculty of Public and Local Government Administration at the Wayne State University in Detroit. He graduated from the university in 1963.

After his study, he went back to Indonesia. Some time after his arrival in Indonesia, Parlagutan was appointed as an acting Director of the Service Course C in Medan in 1963.

== As the Regent of Dairi ==
He was appointed by the Governor of North Sumatra as the acting Regent of Dairi from 5 November 1965 until 31 March 1966, replacing Raja Nembah Maha. The regent was formed on 23 September 1964 following a split in the North Tapanuli Regency. According to the reporter Leonardo Simanjuntak, Parlagutan was responsible for the laying the foundations for developing the region as an independent area.

After his resignation from the position, from 1 April 1966 until 31 August 1966, he was employed as an ahli praja at the office of the Regent of North Tapanuli.

== As the Regent of North Tapanuli ==
On 9 November 1966, Parlagutan was inaugurated as the acting Regent of North Tapanuli. According to his son, Rudy Aryanto, Parlagutan was fully supported by the Deputy Chief of Staff of the Indonesian Army at that time, Maraden Panggabean, to become a definitive Regent of North Tapanuli.

== Death ==
Parlagutan died in office on 27 November 1967 at the official residence of the Regent of North Tapanuli in Tarutung. He was buried in the Taman Bahagia (Joyful Garden), located on the Sisingamangaraja Street in Medan.

== Family ==
Parlagutan was married to Sondang Lumbantobing. The marriage resulted in four children.
