= Elam Sibuea =

Toba Bataknese politician and bureaucrat (1912-1967)

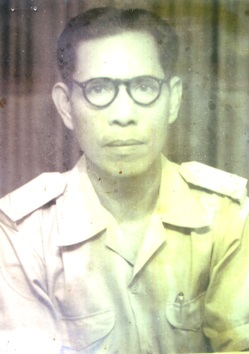

Regent of North Tapanuli
- In office 1 July 1963 – 30 November 1966
- Governor: Eny Karim; Ulung Sitepu
- Preceded by: Sia Marinus Simanjuntak
- Succeeded by: Parlagutan Simanjuntak (Acting); Mangaradja Sinaga

Personal details
- Born: 16 February 1912 Porsea, Dutch East Indies
- Died: 28 May 1967 (aged 55) Pematang Siantar, Indonesia
- Spouse: Marta Sitorus
- Children: Hotma Yunita; Carolina Sanggul; Ivan Doli; Rudy Aryanto

Elam Sibuea (10 February 1912 – 28 May 1967) was a Toba Bataknese politician and bureaucrat person who served as the Regent of North Tapanuli from 1963 until 1966.

== Early life ==
Sibuea was born on 10 February 1912 in a small town named Porsea, as the son of Raja Josua Sibuea. He was the oldest child out of his six brothers and sisters.

He went to study at the Meer Uitgebreid Lager Onderwijs (Junior High School) in Porsea. After graduating, he continued to study at the Hollandsch-Inlandsche School in Pematang Siantar.

== Career ==
Sibuea began his career in 1952, when he was employed as a city employee in Pematang Siantar. He resigned on the same year, and began to work as an employee in the office of the Governor of North Sumatra until 1956. From 1956, he moved to the Nias Island, and he worked as a wedana in Gunungsitoli, the capital of Nias until 1959. He worked as a patih (secretary) in the office of the Regent of North Tapanuli.

== As the Regent of North Tapanuli ==
Sibuea was inaugurated as the Regent of North Tapanuli on 1 July 1963. He resigned on 30 November 1966 due to sickness.

== Death ==
Sibuea died on 28 May 1967 in Pematang Siantar. He was buried in the tambak (farm) of his grandfather, Raja Musa Sibuea.

== Family ==
He was married to Marta née Sitorus. The marriage resulted in six sons and three daughters.
