= 1963 North Sumatra gubernatorial election =

Candidate	Abdul Munir Hamid	Ulung Sitepu
Percentage	65%	35%

The 1963 North Sumatra gubernatorial election was an indirect election held to elect the Governor of North Sumatra for the 1963–1968 term. All members of the Regional People's Representative Council of North Sumatra were eligible to vote for this election.

== Background ==
Following the resignation of Raja Junjungan Lubis as the Governor of North Sumatra, Eny Karim was appointed by the Minister of Internal Affairs as the acting governor of North Sumatra. His main task was to held the elections for a new governor.

== Candidates ==
There were several names were nominated for the candidate of the election, but only two names managed to become the candidate in the election. The first candidate, Abdul Munir Hamid, was supported by almost all of the political parties in the council, except the Indonesian Communist Party. Hamid a manager of several provincial owned companies, such as the Dirga Surya Hotel and the Puri Kayangan public company, which produces cooking oil and washing soap. Meanwhile, the second candidate, Ulung Sitepu, was supported by the Indonesian Communist Party. Sitepu was a military officer who served as the former chief of staff of the Bukit Barisan Military Regional Command.

== Election results ==
Candidate	Percentage
Abdul Munir Hamid	65%
Ulung Sitepu	35%

== Inauguration ==
Although Abdul Munir Hamid won the election, the Minister of Internal Affairs inaugurated Ulung Sitepu instead. Sitepu was inaugurated as the Governor of North Sumatra on 15 July 1963.

== Aftermath ==
=== Reaction ===
The inauguration of Ulung Sitepu as the Governor of North Sumatra was protested by the supporters of Abdul Munir Hamid. Afterwards, clashes occurred between the supporters of Hamid and Sitepu.

=== Trial of Hamid ===
The conflict between Sitepu and Hamid lasted long after the election. Sitepu accused Hamid of corruption, and the communist masses — the main support base for Sitepu — demanded Hamid to be tried at the court. The chairman of the Medan District Court, Marthias, rejected the accusation, citing the lack of evidence.

According to Effendi Nasution, a staunch anti-communist, the communist masses launched another demonstration, demanding Marthias to be fired from his office and Hamid to be hanged. Marthias was later replaced by Palti Raja Siregar, who tried Hamid and sentenced him to 12 years in prison. (Note: Tempo, 25 April 1992, cites Hamid sentence as 14 years in prison.) Hamid appealed his case, and in 1966, his sentence was reduced to 7 years.

Raja Maimunah, the wife of Hamid, recalled that during the trial of Hamid, the communist masses threatened to destroy Hamid's house and the district court building if Munir was not sentenced. Maimunah also stated that Hamid's house was regularly guarded by soldiers due to this threat.

An investigative team formed by the efforts of Hamid supporters began looking into the accusations. The team concluded that there was no corruption conducted by Hamid in the companies. Following the publication of the conclusions, Hamid appealed a review of his case to the Supreme Court of Indonesia in 1967, but his appeal was rejected. He appealed his case again on 16 March 1982, and the Supreme Court instructed the Medan District Court to investigate the issue on 13 August 1983. The district court stated that it could not investigate the issue due to the loss of documents relating to the case.
