= Haranggaol =

Subdistrict in North Sumatra, Indonesia

Coordinates: 2°53′N 98°41′E

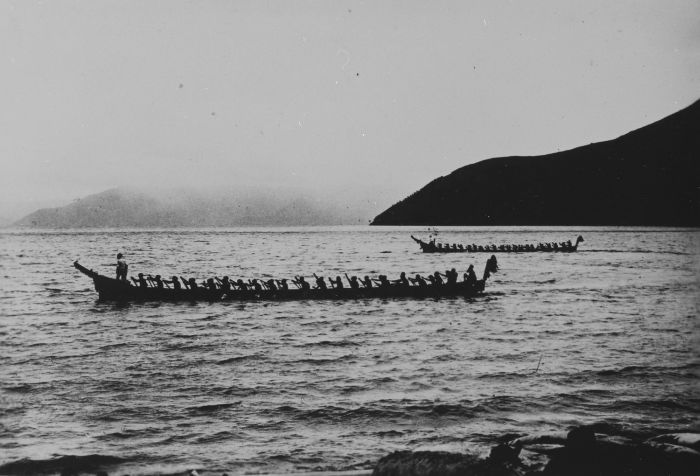
Batak canoes near Haranggaol on Lake Toba (circa 1920)

Haranggaol is a subdistrict in Simalungun, North Sumatra, Indonesia.
