= Zainal Abidin (governor) =

Indonesian politician

Zainal Abidin Sutan Kumala Pontas
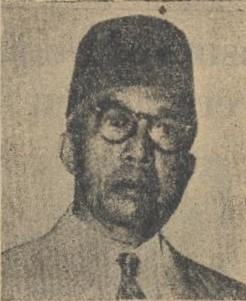

Governor of North Sumatra
- In office 25 January 1957 – 1 April 1960; Acting: 12 March 1956 – 25 January 1957
- President: Sukarno
- Preceded by: Sutan Mohammad Amin Nasution
- Succeeded by: Raja Junjungan Lubis

Zainal Abidin, more commonly known by his title, Sutan Kumala Pontas, was an Indonesian politician who served as governor of North Sumatra in the late 1950s.

He became acting governor after the previous governor, Sutan Mohammad Amin Nasution, resigned.

He was inaugurated as a governor on 25 January 1957.
