= Raja Junjungan Lubis =

Indonesian Mandailing politician

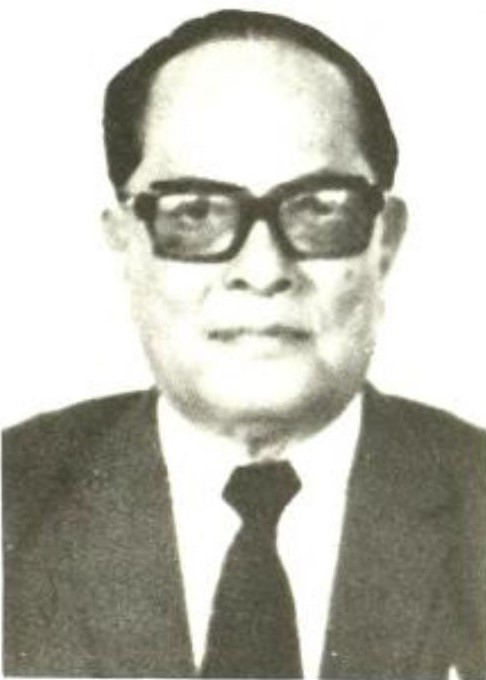

Member of the People's Representative Council
- In office 28 October 1971 – 1 October 1977
- Constituency: North Sumatera

Governor of North Sumatra
- In office 1 April 1960 – 5 April 1963
- Deputy: Raja Syahnan
- Preceded by: Zainal Abidin
- Succeeded by: Eny Karim (acting); Ulung Sitepu

Mayor of Sibolga
- In office 11 February 1954 – 31 December 1957
- Governor: Sutan Mohammad Amin Nasution; Zainal Abidin
- Preceded by: Ibnu Sa'dan
- Succeeded by: D. E. Sutan Bungaran

Regent of Central Tapanuli
- In office 1 February 1954 – 1 August 1958
- Governor: Sutan Mohammad Amin Nasution; Zainal Abidin
- Preceded by: Ibnu Sa'dan
- Succeeded by: Matseh Glr. St. Kajasangan

Regent of South Tapanuli
- In office 1951 – 1 February 1954
- Governor: Abdul Hakim Harahap; Sutan Mohammad Amin Nasution
- Preceded by: Muda Siregar
- Succeeded by: Abdul Aziz Lubis

Regent of Batanggadis
- In office 30 August 1947 – 12 December 1949
- Governor: Sutan Mohammad Amin Nasution; Ferdinand Lumban Tobing
- Preceded by: Position established
- Succeeded by: Fachruddin Nasution

Member of the People's Representative Council of Sumatra
- In office 17 April 1946 – 13 December 1948

Personal details
- Born: 21 August 1906 Huta Godang, Dutch East Indies
- Died: 14 July 1988 Huta Godang, South Tapanuli Regency, North Sumatra, Indonesia
- Party: Golkar (1971–1988)
- Other political affiliations: Independent (before 1971)

Raja Junjungan Lubis (21 August 1906 — 14 July 1988) was an Indonesian Mandailing politician who became the Regent of Batanggadis, Regent of Central Tapanuli, Mayor of Sibolga, Governor of North Sumatra, and member of the People's Representative Council.

== Early life ==
Lubis was born on 21 August 1906 in the city of Huta Godang, Onderafdeeling Mandailing en Natal, Afdeeling Padangsidempuan, Tapanuli Residency, Dutch East Indies. He began his education at the Hollandsch-Inlandsche School (Dutch school for indigenous people), and graduated in 1919. He continued his studies at the Opleiding School Voor Inlandsche Ambtenaren (Training School for Native Civil Servants), and graduated in 1924.

== Career ==
Lubis began his career as the chief of the Ulu Pungkut village in Huta Godang from 1924 until 1945. During this period, he also participated in matters pretraining to Tapanuli traditions. He became the chair of the Bona Bulu Sahat (Our Hometown), a customary institution, in 1939. He also joined the Kerapatan Adat Tapanuli (Tapanuli Customary Institution) in 1941 as its chair, and in the same year also joined the Tapanuli Customary Commission in Padangsidempuan as a central member.

During the Japanese occupation of the Dutch East Indies, Lubis was appointed chairman of the Regional Defense Council of Mandailing Natal in 1943. In 1945, he was appointed as the Chairman of the Mandailing Natal branch of the Hōkōkai, a Japanese-oriented organization. In the same year, he was appointed as the member of the Syu Sangi Kai (advisory council) of Tapanuli. Later on, he was promoted and became the Assistant Resident of Mandailing Natal, the highest office in Mandailing Natal.

After the surrender of Japan on 15 August 1945 and the proclamation of Indonesian Independence on 17 August 1945, on 24 August 1945, the Japanese forces in Mandailing Natal declared that World War II had ended. Although the Japanese did not make any reference to the proclamation of independence, several people in Mandailing Natal began to spread rumor about the proclamation after the return of a Heiho member from Java. Lubis, as the top official in Mandailing Natal, decided to form a body to investigate the matter on 8 September 1945. Hamzah Lubis was sent by Junjungan Lubis to Bukittinggi to meet M. Syafei and Adinegoro to learn if there was any truth to the rumor. Ayub Sulaeman, the secretary of Padangsidempuan, received a wire from Adnan Kapau Gani about the proclamation. Hamzah Lubis would return on 12 September 1945, bringing copies of the Constitution of Indonesia, law about the Indonesian National Committee, and the text of the proclamation of Indonesian Independence.

Junjungan Lubis, as the chairman of the Regional Defense Council of Mandailing Natal, invited other members of the council to discuss the best way to announce the proclamation to the people and enact the law about the Indonesian National Committee. It was decided that the proclamation text would be copied and spread to the whole Mandailing Natal. To execute this decision, the youth members of the council were tasked to spread the text by bicycle or on foot. Another decision was to organize a mass meeting to announce the proclamation directly to the people. The Japanese forces attempted to prevent this mass meeting, but failed. On 3 October 1945, the mass meeting was finally held, and was attended by the Mandailing Natal populace from cities and villages. After the mass meeting, the Regional Defense Council was changed into the Republic of Indonesia Youth.

After announcing the proclamation, the government of Mandailing Natal was tasked with forming the Indonesian National Committee. After deliberations, the government decided that the formation of the Indonesian National Committee should be held at the capital of Tapanuli, Tarutung. Most of Tapanuli local leaders, such as Ferdinand Lumban Tobing, Abdul Hakim Harahap, and Sutan Naga, were already in Tarutung, thus the government of Mandailing Natal decided to send a delegation to Tapanuli. Junjungan Lubis was appointed as the delegate for Mandailing Natal.

On 12 September 1945, Junjungan Lubis, Kari Oesman, and Fachruddin Nasution departed from Padangsidempuan to Tarutung. Junjungan Lubis, along with other delegates, appointed Abdul Hakim Harahap as the formateur of the Indonesian National Committee of Tapanuli. Junjungan Lubis became the member of the Indonesian National Committee of Tapanuli.

During the Indonesian National Revolution, Lubis was appointed as a member of the People's Representative Council of Sumatra, representing Tapanuli. The council was inaugurated on 17 April 1946, and was dissolved after the members of the People's Representative Council of North Sumatra were named on 13 December 1948. Lubis also concurrently held the office as the Regent of Batanggadis from 30 August 1947 until 12 December 1949. He was also appointed as the Chief of Staff for Civilian Affairs in 1949, and on 16 August 1949, he was appointed as the coordinator for civilian affairs in Tapanuli. After his resignation as the Regent of Batanggadis, his office was replaced by Fachruddin Nasution, and he became the Deputy Military Governor of Tapanuli and East Sumatra. As the deputy governor, he was involved in negotiations between the Dutch and Indonesian and was involved in settling the conflicts between rogue warriors in North Sumatra.

After the Indonesian National Revolution ended, Lubis was appointed by the governor of North Sumatra as the Regent of South Tapanuli — consisting of Angkola Sipirok, Padang Lawas, Mandailing Natal — in 1951. During his term, he created 6 new subdistricts in South Tapanuli. On 1 February 1954, he was transferred by governor Sutan Mohammad Amin Nasution to Central Tapanuli, and became the Regent of Central Tapanuli. As the Regent of Central Tapanuli, he also concurrently assumed the office as the Mayor of Sibolga — the capital of Central Tapanuli — on 11 February 1954. He resigned as the Mayor of Sibolga on 31 December 1957, and resigned as the Regent of Central Tapanuli on 1 August 1958.

== As the Governor of North Sumatra ==
On 1 April 1960, Lubis was inaugurated as the Governor of North Sumatra, replacing Zainal Abidin.

During his term, the separatist group of the Revolutionary Government of the Republic of Indonesia (PRRI, Pemerintah Revolusioner Republik Indonesia) officially surrendered in North Sumatra. A surrender ceremony for the PRRI soldiers was held in Padang Lawas. The ceremony was led by Colonel Abdul Manaf Lubis from the Indonesian Army and Captain Hasibuan from the PRRI. The ceremony was attended by Lubis and Karnadi, the chief of police in North Sumatra.

As Lubis was politically independent, Lubis was opposed by the Indonesian Communist Party. The party held rallies and demonstrations to remove non-leftist civil employees and government apparatus. The rallies and demonstration culminated in the demonstration to oust Lubis from his office. As the demonstration became bigger, the central government took action by removing Lubis from office on 25 April 1963. He was replaced by acting governor Eny Karim.

== Later life ==
On 28 October 1971, Lubis was inaugurated as the member of the People's Representative Council, representing South Tapanuli. The term of the council ended on 1 October 1977.

== Legacy ==
The grandson of Junjungan Lubis, Rinaldo Basrah Lubis, has requested to the current Governor of North Sumatra Edy Rahmayadi for Junjungan Lubis's grave to be revitalized and restored. Rahmayadi stated that he had consulted with an expert on tourism to make the grave a heritage site.

== Religious life ==
Lubis was a Muslim. Edy Rahmayadi stated that Lubis was one of the figures who spread and grew Islam in South Tapanuli.

== Awards ==
=== Medals ===
- Independence Struggle Anniversary Medal
- Civil Service Long Service Medals, 2nd Class
- Sapta Marga Medal

=== Other ===
- Award from the government for the successful execution of census in North Sumatra (1960)
- Award letter from the Inter-Regional Commander of Sumatra (1970)
- Title of Freedom Fighter Veteran from the Minister of Defence and Security (1981)
- Award certificate from the Chairman of the Governing Board of Golkar for winning Golkar in the 1982 Indonesian legislative election (1982)

== Bibliography ==
- General Elections Institution (1972), Riwayat Hidup Anggota-Anggota Majelis Permusyawaratan Rakyat Hasil Pemilihan Umum 1971, Jakarta: General Elections Institution
- Tuk Wan Haria, Muhammad (2006), Gubernur Sumatera dan Para Gubernur Sumatera Utara [Governor of Sumatra and Governors of North Sumatra] (in Indonesian), Medan: Library and Regional Archives Bureau of North Sumatra, ISBN 9789791521208
- Tim Penyusun (1984), Sejarah Perjuangan Mobile Brigade Kepolisian R.I. Sumatera Utara/Aceh Tahun 1945—1961 [History of the Mobile Brigade of the North Sumatra/Aceh Indonesian Police from 1945—1961] (in Indonesian), Medan: Yayasan Penampungan Pejuang Polri Sumatera Utara
- Information Bureau of North Sumatra (1953), Republik Indonesia: Propinsi Sumatera Utara (in Indonesian), Medan: Ministry of Information
- Soeyono, Nana Nurliana (1983), Dr. Ferdinand Lumban Tobing (in Indonesian), Jakarta: Ministry of Education and Culture
- Sipahutar, Evi Nenta (2012), FUNGSI DAN STRUKTUR TARI ANAK YANG DIIRINGI MUSIK SIKAMBANG DALAM UPACARA ADAT PERKAWINAN MASYARAKAT PESISIR SIBOLGA TAPANULI TENGAH DI KECAMATAN SIBOLGA KOTA [Function and Structure of Children's Dance Accompanied by Sikambang Music in the Traditional Wedding Ceremony of the Coastal Sibolga Populace, Central Tapanuli, in the Urban Sibolga Subdistrict] (PDF) (in Indonesian), Medan: University of North Sumatra, archived from the original (PDF) on 16 July 2020
- Tim Penyusun (1976), Sumatera Utara membangun (in Indonesian), vol. 1, Medan: Pemerintah Daerah Sumatera Utara
