= 1988 North Sumatra gubernatorial election =

- May 9, 1988
- Turnout: 97.8%
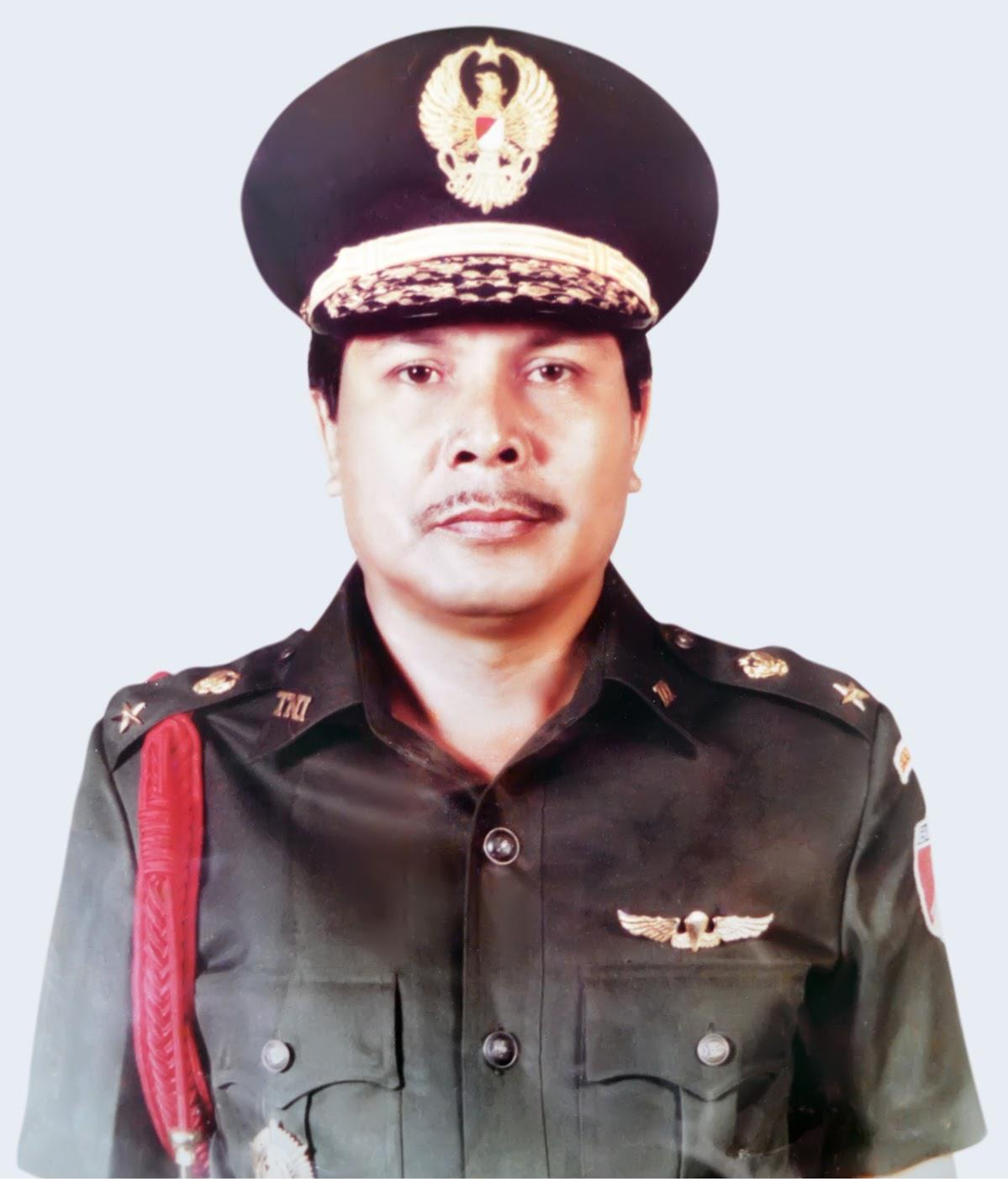

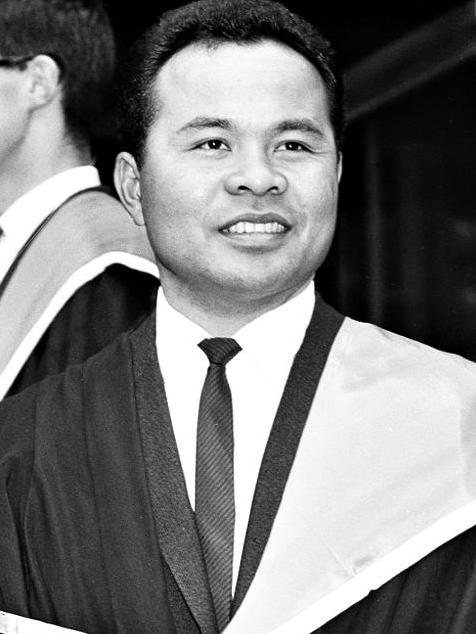

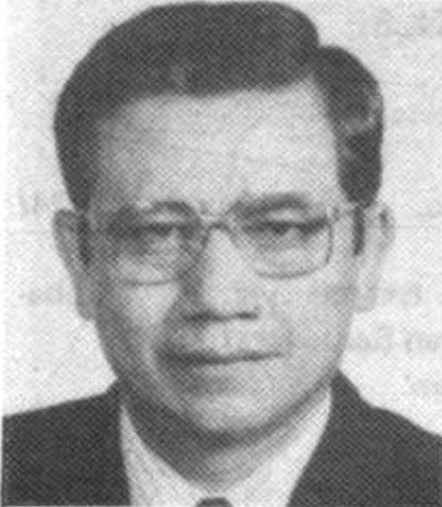
| Candidate | Raja Inal Siregar | Muhammad Abduh Pane | Benhard Mangatur Silitonga |
| Electoral vote | 36 | 5 | 4 |

The 1988 North Sumatra gubernatorial election was an indirect election held on 9 May 1988 to elect the Governor of North Sumatra for the 1988–1993 term. All members of the Regional People's Representative Council of North Sumatra were eligible to vote for this election.

Incumbent governor Kaharuddin Nasution was named as a possible candidate, however, he did not contest in the election.

There were three candidates contesting in this election: Raja Inal Siregar, Muhammad Abduh Pane, and Benhard Mangatur Silitonga.

36 members of the Regional People's Representative Council of North Sumatra voted for Siregar, five members voted for Pane, and four members voted for Silitonga. One member abstained in this election.

After his victory in the election, Raja Inal Siregar was inaugurated as governor on 13 June 1988.
