= Sarimin Reksodihardjo =

Japanese bureaucrat and politician

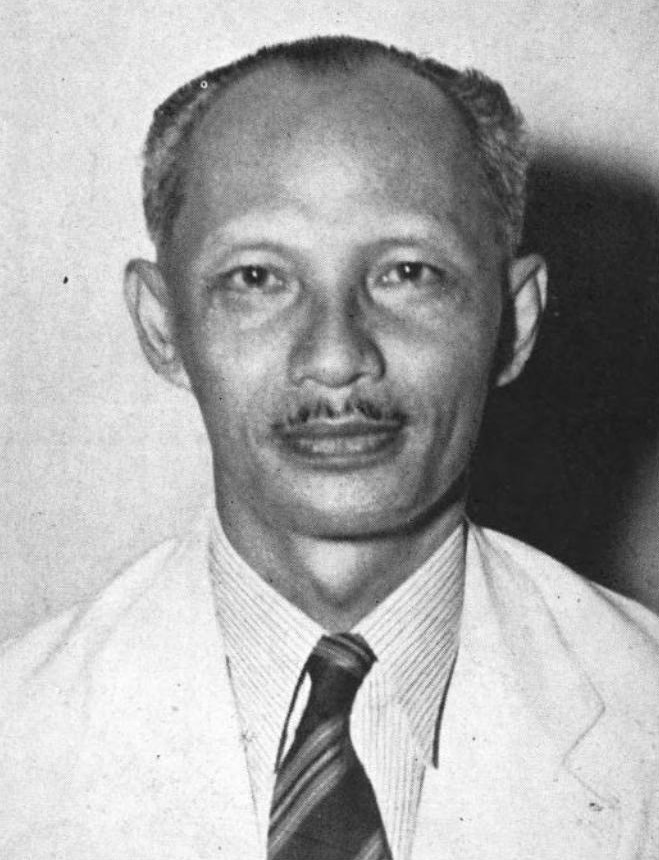

Governor of Nusa Tenggara
- In office 5 April 1952 – 1 April 1957
- President: Sukarno
- Preceded by: Susanto Tirtoprodjo
- Succeeded by: I Gusti Bagus Oka (acting); Teuku Daudsjah

Governor of North Sumatra (acting)
- In office 14 August 1950 – 25 January 1951
- President: Sukarno
- Preceded by: Sutan Mohammad Amin Nasution
- Succeeded by: Abdul Hakim Harahap

Regent of Brebes
- In office 1945–1946
- Governor: Soeroso; Wongsonegoro
- Preceded by: Sunarya
- Succeeded by: K.H. Syatori

Personal details
- Born: 17 July 1905 Kalidesel, Wonosobo, Dutch East Indies
- Died: 1992 (age 86-87) Purwokerto, Central Java, Indonesia
- Spouse: Sartinah Wirjodihardjo

Sarimin Reksodihardjo (17 July 1905 – 1992) was a Javanese bureaucrat and politician.

Born in Wonosobo, Sarimin was employed by the Wedana (district head) of Ajibarang, Central Java after finishing his studies at the OSVIA (academy of governance). After the Indonesian independence, he was appointed as the Regent of Brebes, the head of Agrarian Affairs in the Ministry of Home Affairs, the acting Governor of North Sumatra, and as the Governor of Nusa Tenggara. After he retired from politics, he began involved in business, becoming the President and Director of the Gresik Cement factory.

== Early life ==
Sarimin went to study at the Hollandsch-Inlandsche School (HIS, Dutch Native School) and Opleiding School Voor Inlandsche Ambtenaren (OSVIA, Training School for Natives Civil Servants), graduating from the latter in 1924.

== Career ==
After he graduated from OSVIA, from 1924 until 1926 he was employed in the office of the Wedana of Ajibarang. He moved from Ajibarang, and 1926 until 1928 he worked as a mantri (expert) in Cilacap, and from 1928 to 1933 he worked as the deputy to the regent's secretary in Cilacap and Kendal. During this time, from 1931 until 1933, he went to study again at the Bestuurschool (Civil Servants School), graduating from the school in 1933.

From 1933 until 1938, he was appointed Assistant Wedana of the Weleri District in Kendal Regency, the Brati District in Grobogan, and the Pulukon District. To make himself eligible for the Wedana position, from 1938 until 1941, he attended the prestigious Bestuursacademie (Civil Servants Academy). He was one of the thirteen students from the academy who managed to graduate before the Japanese occupation in 1942.

After he graduated, he began to work at the office of the Resident of Pekalongan.

On 1 July 1941, he was appointed by the resident as the Wedana of Wiradesa in the Pekalongan Regency. He still held the office after the Japanese occupation.

== As the Regent of Brebes ==
On 29 April 1945, the resident of Pekalongan, T. Tokonami, appointed Sarimin as the Regent of Brebes on 29 April 1945. He was still in office after the independence of Indonesia.

== Head of Agrarian Affairs ==
In 1946, Sarimin was appointed by the Minister of Internal Affairs as the head of the Agrarian Affairs of the Ministry of Internal Affairs.

=== Basic Agrarian Law ===
During his time as the head of the Agrarian Affairs, he was involved in the creation of the Basic Agrarian Law. On 21 May 1948, with the P, he was appointed by President Sukarno as the chairman of the Yogyakarta Agrarian Committee. The committee consisted of officials from different ministries and bureaus, members of the Working Body of the Central Indonesian National Committee, experts on customary law, and representatives from the Union of Plantation Laborers.

After the recognition of sovereignty, the capital of Indonesia was moved to Jakarta. By this, the Yogyakarta Agrarian Committee was dissolved, and on 19 March 1952, the new committee, the Jakarta Agrarian Committee, was formed. Sarimin was still in office as the chairman, and his deputy was Sadjarwo the Head of General Politic Affairs and Planning of the Ministry of Agriculture.

Due to his appointment as the Governor of Nusa Tenggara, his day-to-day work in the committee was partially helped by Singgih Praptodihardjo, the Deputy Head of Agrarian Affairs.

Sarimin resigned in 1953. His position as the Head of Agrarian Affairs and the Chairman of the Jakarta Agrarian Committee was replaced by Singgih.

=== As the Acting Governor of North Sumatra ===
As part of his job in the Ministry of Internal Affairs, on 14 July 1950 and 1 August 1950, Sarimin was appointed as the chairman of the Preparatory Committee of the Unitary State for East Sumatra (PPKNST, Panitya Persiapan Negara Kesatuan untuk Sumatera Timur) and the Committee for the Establishment of the Province of North Sumatra (P4SU, Panitia Penjelenggara Pembentukan Propinsi Sumatera Utara). The PPKNST's main task was to dissolve the parliament and the departments of the State of East Sumatra and transfer the power peacefully from the State of East Sumatra to the Republic of Indonesia, while the P4SU's main task was to form the province of North Sumatra.

His appointment as chairman was taking into consideration that the region of North Sumatra was ethnically diverse. The government appointed a Javanese as a middle ground for the issue.

On 20 July 1950, the PPKNST announced its program. In the program, the PPKNST stated that the State of East Sumatra would be transformed into a residency without any autonomy, while its regencies would be an autonomous region and directly controlled by the provincial government. On 23 July 1950, the Government of East Sumatra, represented by Raja Kaliamsyah Sinaga, officially responded to the program. The government of East Sumatra opposed the transformation of the state into a residency and instead opted for the transformation into a province.

After the State of East Sumatra was dissolved on 13 August 1950, the P4SU took its job. The P4SU began preparing the regional division of the province, and the establishment of regional councils in the regencies.

As the chairman of the P4SU, Sarimin became the province's acting governor. His job ended after the definitive governor, Abdul Hakim Harahap, was appointed.

== Governor of Nusa Tenggara ==
On 5 April 1952, Sarimin became the acting Governor of the Lesser Sunda Province. He replaced the previous governor, Susanto Tirtoprodjo, who was appointed as the ambassador of Indonesia to the Netherlands.

He was inaugurated as a definitive governor on 6 May 1953.

During his tenure, on 28 May 1954, the province's name was changed to Nusa Tenggara. The change was intended to remove the term "lesser" from the province because it was considered as a derogatory term.

He resigned from the position on 1 April 1957.

== President Director of the Gresik Cement Factory ==
After his resignation as the Governor of Nusa Tenggara, Sarimin was appointed as the President Director of the Gresik Cement Factory on 1 April 1957. He resigned from the position on 20 April 1961.

== Bibliography ==
- Gunseikanbu (1944), Orang Indonesia jang Terkemoeka di Djawa (in Indonesian)
- Suryanegara, Ahmad Mansur (2016), Api Sejarah 2 (in Indonesian), Surya Dinasti, ISBN 9786027123724
- Sutherland, Heather (April 1974), "Notes on Java's Regent Families: Part II" (PDF), Indonesia, 17 (17), Cornell University Southeast Asia Program: 1–42, doi:10.2307/3350770, hdl:1813/53573, JSTOR 3350770
- Information Bureau of North Sumatra (1953), Republik Indonesia: Propinsi Sumatera Utara (in Indonesian), Medan: Ministry of Information
- Sihombing, M.F. (2018), Sejarah Hukum Tanah di Indonesia (in Indonesian), Jakarta: Kencana Media
- Rachman, Noer Fauzi (2017), Petani & Penguasa: Dinamika Perjalanan Politik Agraria Indonesia (in Indonesian), Jakarta: INSIST Press
- Sjamsuddin, Nazaruddin (1990), Pemberontakan kaum republik: kasus Darul Islam Aceh (in Indonesian), Jakarta: Grafiti Press
- Ministry of Information (1954), Kami Perkenalkan (in Indonesian), Jakarta
- Tuk Wan Haria, Muhammad (2006), Gubernur Sumatera dan Para Gubernur Sumatera Utara [The Governor of Sumatra and the Governors of North Sumatra] (in Indonesian), Medan: Library and Regional Archives Bureau of North Sumatra, ISBN 9789791521208
- Information Bureau of Lesser Sunda (1953), Republik Indonesia: Propinsi Sunda Ketjil (in Indonesian), Singaraja: Ministry of Information
- Lucas, Anton (February 1980), The Bamboo Spear Pierces the Payung: the Revolution Against the Bureaucratic Elite in North Central Java in 1945 (PDF), The Australian National University, doi:10.25911/5d7633feb5539
