= 1998 North Sumatra gubernatorial election =

← 1993	May 14, 1998	2003 →
- Turnout: 100%
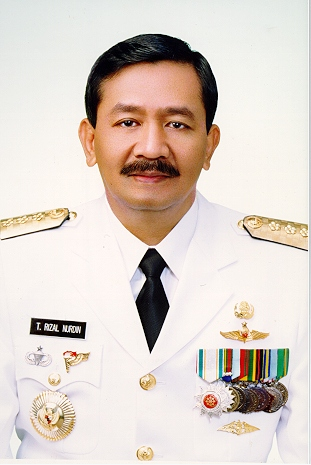
Candidate	Tengku Rizal Nurdin	Usman Pelly	Drs. Asal Manganar Situmorang (Drs. A.M. Situmorang)
Electoral vote	49	3	3

The 1998 North Sumatra gubernatorial election was an indirect election held to elect the Governor of North Sumatra for the 1998–2003 term. All members of the Regional People's Representative Council of North Sumatra were eligible to vote for this election.

== Background ==
Following the victory of Raja Inal Siregar in the 1993 North Sumatra gubernatorial election, Siregar was sworn in as the Governor of North Sumatra for the second time on 14 June 1993. His five-year term was to end on 1998, thus an election is prepared to elect a new governor.

== Schedule ==
Event	Date
Nomination of candidates	9 February — 21 March 1998
Screening of candidates nominee	23 March — 27 April 1998
Official announcement of candidates	1 May 1998
Election day	14 May 1998

== Candidates ==
=== Nominations ===
Although the official date for the nomination of candidates began in February, names for candidacy had circulated since January. By the end of the nomination period, there were 42 candidates, consisting of 24 civilians, 8 active generals, 8 retired generals, and 2 officers.

Candidates

Civilians

- Usman Pelly
- Drs. Asal Manganar Situmorang (Drs. A.M. Situmorang)
- Zulkifli Harahap
- Rihold Sihotang
- Rohani Darus Danil

Active generals

- Major General Agum Gumelar
- Major General A Muis Lubis
- Major General Riswandi Siregar
- Major General Wahidin Yusuf
- Major General Luhut Panjaitan
- Major General Aripin Tarigan
- Major General Rizal Nurdin
- Major General Sabar Pakpahan

Retired generals

- Brigadier General (Ret) Mudyono
- Brigadier General (Ret) Muhammad Ali Imron Siregar
- Major General (Ret) Syamsir Siregar
- Major General (Ret) Raja Kami Sembiring

Officers

The Martabe Association in West Java held a forum for the candidate nominees in Bandung on 18 February 1998. The chairman of the seminar, Dr Barita E. Siregar, stated that the main goal of the seminar was to give input to the candidates about the welfare conditions in North Sumatra.

=== Official announcement and support ===
On 1 May 1998, following deliberations by the Regional People's Representative Council of North Sumatra, the council announced the list of candidates for the gubernatorial election. The candidates were Tengku Rizal Nurdin, Usman Pelly, and Drs. Asal Manganar Situmorang (Drs. A.M. Situmorang). The list was approved by the Minister of Internal Affairs, Raden Hartono, on 12 May 1998.

At this point, Tengku Rizal Nurdin had gained the support of the four factions within the council, as well as received an approval telegram from the Chief of Staff of the Army, dated 3 April 1998.

== Election ==
=== Attendance ===
The election was led by Speaker of the Regional People's Representative Council of North Sumatra, and was attended by Director General of Government and Regional Autonomy Oman Sachroni, Vice Governor Abdul Wahab Dalimunthe, Commander of Bukit Barisan Military Region Ismed Yuzairi, Chief of Police of North Sumatra Sutiyono, Attorney General of North Sumatra Antonius Suyata, and Vice Secretary General of the United Development Party Bachtiar Chamsyah.

After the elections, Sachroni stated that the proceedings went orderly and smoothly in a span of two hours, due to the election being done in accordance with the law.

=== Results ===
Candidates	Votes	Percentage
Tengku Rizal Nurdin	49	89%
Usman Pelly	3	5.5%
Drs. Asal Manganar Situmorang (Drs. A.M. Situmorang)	3	5.5%
Total	55	100%

== Aftermath ==
=== Reaction ===
Following the victory of Tengku Rizal Nurdin, protests ensued. The North Sumatra Youth and Student Communication Forum (Forum Komunikasi Pemuda dan Mahasiswa Jakarta, Sumatera Utara, FKPMSU) stated in front of the People's Representative Council that the election had been manipulated. A member from the 1st Committee of the People's Representative Council replied that the election had been conducted in accordance with the law.

Citing this protest and ones held in four other provinces, the Minister of Internal Affairs Syarwan Hamid stated his reluctance to hold another election.

=== Protests against inauguration ===
On 12 June 1998, a group that called themselves the Democracy Consortium Group of 37 Youth, Student and Community Organizations of North Sumatra (Konsorsium Demokrasi Kelompok 37 Organisasi Pemuda, Mahasiswa dan Masyarakat Sumut) demanded that the Regional People's Representative Council of North Sumatra cancel Nurdin's inauguration. The consortium stated that "the candidacy of Rizal does not represent the will of the people and his election is based on corruption, collusion, and nepotism". Syawaluddin, one of the representatives, read out a statement from the consortium. He stated: "If the inauguration is forced, that would cause unrest and further demonstrations. We are not scaring you".

The Deputy Speaker of the Regional People's Representative Council of North Sumatra, Aminullah Purba, stated that if the people had authentic proof that the election was rigged, they should send it to the authorities. Purba also stated that Nurdin's candidacy was accepted due to his approval as the Governor of North Sumatra by the Commander of the Armed Forces.

Following the protests, Speaker M. Ishak requested the assistance of the armed forces and the police to safeguard the inauguration and to anticipate demonstrations that could possibly disrupt the inauguration.

=== Inauguration ===
The inauguration of Nurdin was held on 15 June 1998. Nurdin was inaugurated by Syarwan Hamid, and the event was attended by Commander of Bukit Barisan Military Region Ismed Yuzairi, Chief of Police of North Sumatra Sutiyono, and other officials.

In his speech, Hamid reminded Nurdin to avoid corruption, collusion, and nepotism, and to serve the people's needs.
