= Sutan Mohammad Amin Nasution =

Indonesian writer

Mr. Sutan Mohammad Amin Nasution
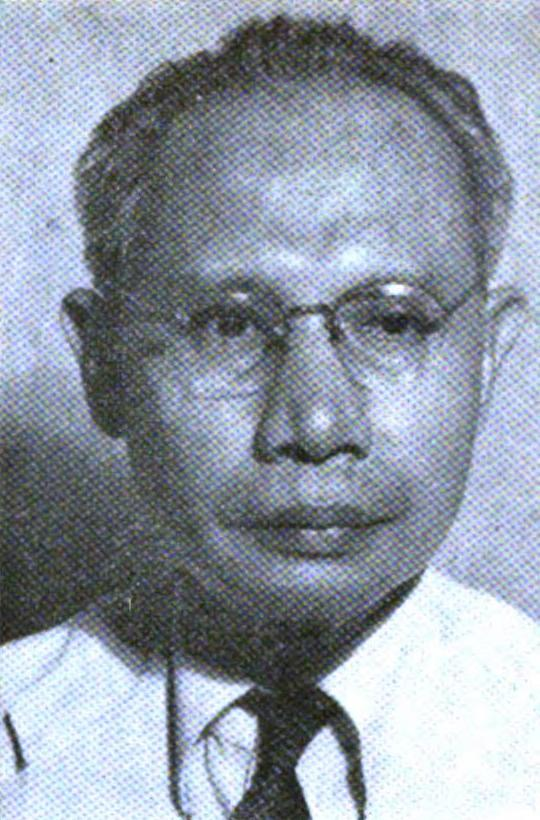

Junior Governor of North Sumatra
- In office 14 April 1947 – 17 January 1948
- President: Sukarno
- Preceded by: position established
- Succeeded by: Himself (as Governor of North Sumatra)

Governor of North Sumatra
- In office 19 June 1948 – 17 May 1949
- President: Sukarno
- Preceded by: Teuku Mohammad Hasan (as Governor of Sumatra); Himself (as Junior Governor of North Sumatra)
- Succeeded by: Sarimin Reksodihardjo (acting); Abdul Hakim Harahap
- In office 23 October 1953 – 12 March 1956
- President: Sukarno
- Preceded by: Abdul Hakim Harahap
- Succeeded by: Zainal Abidin

1st Governor of Riau
- In office 5 March 1958 – 6 January 1960
- President: Sukarno
- Preceded by: position established
- Succeeded by: Kaharuddin Nasution

Personal details
- Born: Krueng Raba Nasution; 22 February 1904 Lhoknga, Aceh Besar, Aceh
- Died: 16 April 1993 (aged 89) Jakarta, Indonesia
- Resting place: Tanah Kusir Public Cemetery, Jakarta
- Spouse: Cut Maryam
- Children: 4
- Parent(s): Muhammad Taif; Siti Madina

Sutan Mohammad Amin Nasution, also known by his birth name Krueng Raba Nasution (22 February 1904 – 16 April 1993), was an Indonesian lawyer and politician with an Acehnese–Mandailing background.

Born in Aceh, Nasution became an attorney after finishing his studies at the Higher Law School in Batavia. After the Indonesian independence, he was involved in the independence movement, serving mainly as a head of the North Sumatra province, albeit with different names. He also served as the first Governor of Riau.

== Early life ==
Nasution was born on 22 February 1904 in Lhoknga, Aceh Besar, with the name Krueng Raba Nasution. He was the son of Muhammad Taif, an Acehnese, and Siti Madinah, a Batak Mandailing. He was the fifth of his parents' six children.

Nasution went to study at the Europeesche Lagere School (ELS, European Primary School) in Sabang in 1912. Three years later, in 1915, he moved to the ELS in Solok, and in 1916, he moved again to the ELS in Sibolga and the ELS in Tanjung Pinang until he finally graduated in 1918.

After graduating from the school, he went to study at the STOVIA (medicine school) in Batavia (now Jakarta) in 1919. At the STOVIA, he became active in the student movements and joined the Jong Sumatranen Bond (Union of Sumatran Students). He only studied at the STOVIA for two years, until he left in 1921.

In 1921, Nasution went to study at the Meer Uitgebreid Lager Onderwijs (MULO, Junior High School). His academic achievements at the high school meant that he was accepted as a student in the Algemeene Middelbare School (AMS, High School) in Jogjakarta. During his time in the AMS, he was introduced to nationalist ideology by his friend Muhammad Yamin. By mid-1927, he graduated from the AMS with a good score and continued his studies at the Rechtschoogeschool (Higher Law School) in Batavia.

During his study at the Rechtschoogeschool, he became one of the founding members of the Young Indonesians organization. The organization would later hold the Second Youth Congress in Batavia.

== Career ==
After his graduation, he finally obtained the Meester in de Rechten (Mr., Master of Laws) degree, and on 16 July 1934, he began his career as an attorney in Kutaraja, Aceh. He defied his father, who wanted him to work as a civil employee in the Dutch East Indies government.

About seven years after his career began, Japanese forces occupied Aceh. During the Japanese occupation, he worked as a judge in Sigli.

One year after he was appointed a judge, he was transferred as a director of the Kutaraja High School. He also became a teacher there.

During this time, he became a member of the Great Indonesia Party.

== As the Junior Governor of North Sumatra ==
After the Japanese surrendered on 15 August 1945, the independence of Indonesia was proclaimed on 17 August 1945. The Indonesian government quickly set up provinces and appointed governors to the provinces. The Sumatra province, which consisted of the North Sumatra, Central Sumatra, and South Sumatra sub-province was formed, and Teuku Muhammad Hasan was inaugurated as the governor of the province on 29 September 1945. The North Sumatra sub-province consisted of Aceh, Tapanuli, and East Sumatra Residency.

As the governor of Sumatra, Hasan appointed three junior governors to act as his deputies in the residencies. Nasution was inaugurated by Hasan as the Junior Governor of North Sumatra on 14 April 1947. His inauguration was held at the Elephant Division II building in Siantar and was attended by Teuku Muhammad Daudsjah, the Resident of Aceh, Ferdinand Lumban Tobing, the Resident of North Sumatra, and Abubakar Jaar, the Resident of East Sumatra.

At first, it was decided that the capital of the North Sumatra sub-province was Medan, but due to the occupation of Medan by the Dutch army, it was decided that the location of Nasution's inauguration, Siantar, as the capital of the sub-province. Sometime later, Siantar was occupied by the Dutch army, so the government of the sub-province decided to move the capital to Kutaraja, Aceh.

Even though Siantar was occupied by the Dutch army, Nasution recklessly visited his mother's house in the Mandailing Village in Siantar. When Nasution arrived, his mother's house was surrounded by the Dutch army. He was arrested and brought to Medan under tight escort. He was put on house arrest under heavy surveillance in a home owned by a man named Yusuf.

During his house arrest, Nasution observed the preparations for the formation of the State of East Sumatra, which was attended by notable figures in East Sumatra. He noted that some sympathizers of the Republic of Indonesia participated in the preparations. He also figured out underground movements acting against the state.

After 40 days under house arrest, Nasution fled from the house. He left Medan for the Penang, and after several days in Penang, he went back to Aceh. On 17 January 1948, he was temporarily relieved from his position as the Junior Governor of North Sumatra, was appointed as a member of the Supreme Army Court, and was given a nominal rank of major general, despite having no military experience.

== As the Governor of North Sumatra ==
=== First term ===
With the Law No. 10 of 1948, dated 15 April 1948, the Province of Sumatra was abolished, and the sub-provinces of North Sumatra, Central Sumatra, and South Sumatra became a province. Nasution was inaugurated by President Sukarno as the Governor of North Sumatra on 19 June 1948. His inauguration began at 8 PM and was attended by the Daud Beureu'eh, Military Governor for Aceh, Langkat, and Karo.

During his term, he began printing local money for the province of North Sumatra, namely the Uang Republik Indonesia Sumatera Utara (URIPSU, Money of the Republic of Indonesia for North Sumatra). This policy was implemented to repair the war-torn economy, and the money was officially released on 1 March 1949 with Nasution's signature on it.

=== Government Commissioner for North Sumatra ===
After the occupation of Jogjakarta, the central government of Indonesia in Java was dissolved. To cope with this problem, the Emergency Government of the Republic of Indonesia (PDRI) was established on 22 December 1948 in Bukittinggi, Central Sumatra (now West Sumatra). During this emergency government, the position of governor was abolished, and civilian and military powers were given over to the military governor.

In North Sumatra, Nasution handed over his power to the military governor Ferdinand Lumban Tobing (for the region of Tapanuli and Southern East Sumatra) and Daud Beureu'eh (for the Langkat and Karo regency). Nasution himself became the Commissary of the Central Government for North Sumatra on 17 May 1949, with the decision No. 23 of the PDRI.

After the formation of the United States of Indonesia, the Preparatory Committee of the Unitary State for East Sumatra (PPKNST) was formed on 14 July 1950 with the Decree of the Minister of Internal Affairs. The committee main task was to integrate the State of East Sumatra to the Republic of Indonesia. Nasution was appointed as a member of the committee.

With the formal dissolution of the State of East Sumatra on 13 August 1950, the post of the Governor of North Sumatra was established on 14 August 1950. Sarimin Reksodihardjo, the chairman of the PPKNST, was appointed as the acting Governor of North Sumatra. Nasution then handed over his position to Sarimin.

After the handover of power to Sarimin, Nasution moved to Jakarta and worked as a lawyer.

=== Second term ===
On 23 October 1953, Nasution was reelected as the Governor of North Sumatra by the Regional People's Representative Council of North Sumatra.

During his second term, Nasution was faced with demands from the Aceh Residency to become an autonomous region. This demand escalated into an armed rebellion when the former Military Governor of Aceh, Daud Beureu'eh, declared Aceh as part of the Islamic State of Indonesia on 20 September 1953. Since then, other problems arose from this rebellion, such as the conflict between the Islamic scholars that joined Ulama Association of Aceh (PUSA) and non-PUSA Islamic scholars, and the Sayid Ali movement.

After his term as the Governor of North Sumatra ended on 12 March 1956, he moved again to Jakarta and worked under the Ministry of Internal Affairs.

== In the Ministry of Internal Affairs ==
During his time working in the Ministry of Internal Affairs, Amin became a major proponent for the concept of regional autonomy. He became the chairman of the Committee for the Regional Division of Indonesia. He seated the position until 31 August 1956.

== Death ==
At 12:15 on 16 April 1993, Nasution died at the Indonesian Navy Hospital in Jakarta. He was buried at the Tanah Kusir Public Cemetery at 12:00 noon on 17 April 1993.

== Awards ==
- Satyalancana Peringatan Perjuangan Kemerdekaan RI (1961)
- Bintang Legiun Veteran Republik Indonesia (Star of the Veterans’ Legion of Indonesia) (1991)
- Bintang Jasa Utama (1st Class Star of Service) (1991)
- Bintang Mahaputra (Star of Mahaputera) (posthumously, 1998)

== Legacy ==
The Government of North Sumatra has campaigned to make Nasution a National Hero of Indonesia.

A street in Pekanbaru, the capital of Riau, is named after him.

== Bibliography ==
- Tuk Wan Haria, Muhammad (2006), Gubernur Sumatera dan Para Gubernur Sumatera Utara [The Governor of Sumatra and the Governors of North Sumatra] (in Indonesian), Medan: Library and Regional Archives Bureau of North Sumatra, ISBN 9789791521208
- Sudirman (2015), "Mr. Sutan Muhammad Amin" (PDF), HABA (in Indonesian), 77
- Information Bureau of North Sumatra (1953), Republik Indonesia: Propinsi Sumatera Utara (in Indonesian), Medan: Ministry of Information
- Sjamsuddin, Nazaruddin (1998), Revolusi di Serambi Mekkah: Perjuangan Kemerdekaan dan Pertarungan Politik di Aceh, 1945-1949 (in Indonesian), Jakarta: University of Indonesia
- Ministry of Information (1954), Kami Perkenalkan (in Indonesian), Jakarta
