= Eny Karim =

Indonesian politician and civil servant

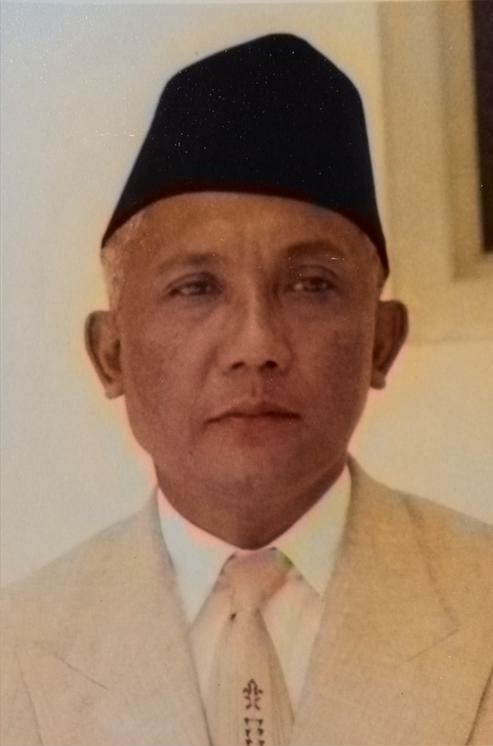
- Karim as Minister of Agriculture

Minister of Agriculture
- In office 26 March 1956 – 14 March 1957
- Prime Minister: Ali Sastroamidjojo
- Preceded by: Mohammad Sardjan
- Succeeded by: Sadjarwo Djarwonagoro

Governor of North Sumatra (Acting)
- In office 8 April 1963 – 15 July 1963
- Preceded by: Raja Junjungan Lubis
- Succeeded by: Ulung Sitepu

Personal details
- Born: 22 October 1910 Batusangkar, West Sumatra
- Died: 5 September 1995 (aged 84) Jakarta, Indonesia
- Party: Indonesian National Party

Eny Karim (22 October 1910 – 5 September 1995), also spelled as Eni Karim, was an Indonesian politician and civil servant from West Sumatra who served as Minister of Agriculture under the Second Ali Sastroamidjojo Cabinet, and briefly as governor of North Sumatra in 1963.

== Early life ==
Karim was born in Batusangkar, today in the Tanah Datar Regency of West Sumatra, on 22 October 1910. He underwent education in Bukittinggi, completing elementary education in 1924, MULO in 1927, and a "nobility school" (MOSVIA) training local nobility to be civil servants in 1931.

== Career ==
After completing school, Karim was assigned by the colonial government to Pontianak, where he worked for eight years before he returned to West Sumatra to be assigned in Solok. After the Japanese invasion, Karim went into hiding for some time as the Japanese sought to capture former colonial officials before a lack of administrative personnel prompted the Japanese to offer Karim his civil servant work back. He was assigned to Bukittinggi in 1943, working there a year before being reassigned to Air Bangis, West Pasaman Regency. He returned to Bukittinggi in mid-1945.

Following Indonesian independence, Karim began to work under the Indonesian government. He was briefly detained by Masyumi rebels during the 3 March affair, though the rebellion was short-lived and Karim was soon after freed. He served as the secretary to the Republican military governor of Central Sumatra, Sutan Mohammad Rasjid, between Operation Kraai and the end of the revolution. He also headed the residency of West Sumatra, under the military governor. For a time, he also taught as a lecturer in a civil servant academy which was established in Bukittinggi.

During the post-revolutionary period, Karim was appointed as Minister of Agriculture, representing the Indonesian National Party, for the Second Ali Sastroamidjojo Cabinet. He was dispatched to lead the Indonesian delegation to the FAO. In a period of high tensions in West Sumatra, in January 1957 Karim was sent to lead a delegation from the national government to the "Banteng Council". While Karim and his entourage were accepted, the council refused to negotiate with the group. Karim's later press statement in Jakarta received a backlash from the council, as Karim claimed that he had negotiated a form of settlement and given some money to the council. Karim was in Bukittinggi to continue negotiations in February 1958 when the Revolutionary Government of the Republic of Indonesia (PRRI) was declared, and he was detained by PRRI.

Karim joined the Ministry of Home Affairs after his ministerial career, becoming the director for general governance in 1959, and later the ministry's secretary-general by 1962. After the post of secretary general was abolished, Karim was installed as the assistant to the minister of general governance and regional autonomy for administration affairs on 8 January 1963. He was appointed acting governor of North Sumatra several months later on 8 April 1963, replacing Raja Junjungan Lubis who was facing significant opposition from the Indonesian Communist Party. He held this post until a new governor was elected and sworn in by the provincial legislature on 15 July 1963. He retired as a civil servant in 1967.

He died on 5 September 1995 in Jakarta, and was buried at the Karet Cemetery.

== Bibliography ==
- Asnan, Gusti (2007). Memikir ulang regionalisme: Sumatera Barat tahun 1950-an (in Indonesian). Yayasan Obor Indonesia. ISBN 978-979-461-640-6.
- Bahar, Saafroedin (2018). Etnik, Elite, dan Integrasi Nasional: Minangkabau 1945-1984 Republik Indonesia 1985-2015 (in Indonesian). Gre Publishing.
- Idris, Soewardi (2001). Pejuang kemerdekaan Sumbar-Riau: pengalaman tak terlupakan (in Indonesian). Yayasan Pembangunan Pejuang 1945 Sumatra Tengah.
- Panitia Penyusun Naskah (1966), 20 Tahun Indonesia Merdeka, vol. 2, Jakarta: Departemen Penerangan
