= Roos Telaumbanua =

Indonesian priest and politician (1919–1987)

The Reverend Roos Telaumbanua
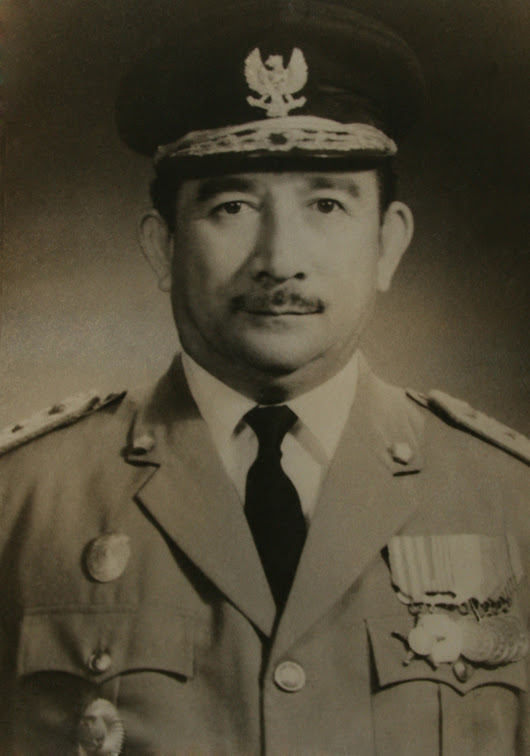
- Official portrait, c. 1966

Member of the People's Representative Council
- In office 28 October 1971 – 1 October 1977
- Constituency: North Sumatra (Nias)

8th Governor of North Sumatra
- In office 16 November 1965 – 31 March 1967
- Preceded by: Ulung Sitepu
- Succeeded by: Marah Halim Harahap

8th Mayor of Medan
- In office 10 October 1964 – 27 August 1965
- Preceded by: Basyrah Lubis
- Succeeded by: Aminurrasjid

2nd Regent of Nias
- In office November 1946 – 1 February 1954
- Preceded by: Daliziduhu Marunduri
- Succeeded by: Humala Frederick Situmorang

Personal details
- Born: Roos Telaumbanua; 30 September 1919 Gunungsitoli, Nias, Dutch East Indies
- Died: 16 February 1987 (aged 67) Gunungsitoli, North Sumatra, Indonesia
- Party: Golkar
- Other political affiliations: Parkindo
- Spouse: Ramina Barasi Zebua
- Children: 12
- Occupation: Priest; politician; bureaucrat

Pandita Roos Telaumbanua (30 September 1919 – 16 February 1987) was an Indonesian Nias priest, politician, and bureaucrat, who served as the Regent of Nias, acting Mayor of Medan, acting Governor of Sumatra, and the member of People's Representative Council.

== Early life ==
Telaumbanua was born on 30 September 1919, as the son of a clergy named Karöröwa Telaumbanua who was married to Otilie. He was born in the city of Gunungsitoli, the capital of Nias. He began to study at the Hollandsch-Inlandsche School (Dutch school for indigenous people) in Tarutung, graduating from the school in 1936, and continued to study at the Meer Uitgebreid Lager Onderwijs (extended elementary school), and graduated in 1940. Since then, he moved to Surakarta, and continued his studies at the Hollandsch Inlandsche Kweekschool (Teachers' School). He only reached the fifth class and did not graduate from the school. He returned to Nias, where he entered the Priest School and graduated from the school in 1943 with the title of Pandita.

== Career ==
After his graduation from the Priest School, Telaumbanua returned to Nias, and began his career as a priest, and began his service in the BNKP (Banua Niha Keriso Protestan, Protestant Christian Church of Nias). He began his political career after the independence career, when he was elected as the First Chairman of the Indonesian National Committee of Nias on 13 October 1945.

== As the Head of Luhak of Nias ==
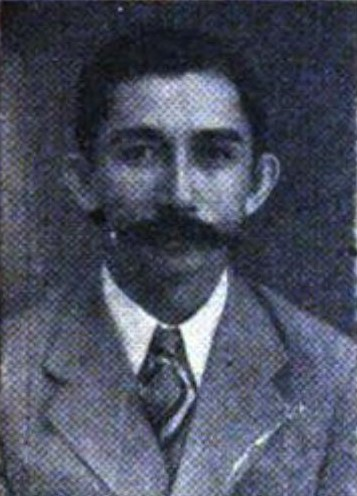
Roos Telaumbanua as the Head of Luhak of Nias.

A year later, in November 1946, the Head of Luhak (regency) of Nias, Daliziduhu Marunduri, handed over his power to Telaumbanua. Telaumbanua still held the position of the Chairman of the Indonesian National Committee of Nias.

=== Regional Money of Republic Indonesia for Nias ===
Due to the inaccessibility of Nias from the Sumatran mainland, the Regional Money of Republic Indonesia (ORIPDA) that was printed in Bukittinggi for Sumatra could not be distributed to Nias. Naval blockades that was imposed by the Dutch Navy in the West Sumatran coastline caused the scarcity of official ORIPDA banknotes and caused riots in Nias society. To cope with this problem, Telaumbanua asked the Government of Sumatra for the Nias government to print their own banknotes. The Governor of Sumatra, Teuku Muhammad Hasan, approved Telaumbanua's idea, and from 1947 and 1949, the Government of Nias began to print their own banknotes. The banknotes were named ORIPDA-Nias.

The first production of the banknotes were printed on 25 September 1947. The second and third productions were printed on 20 December 1948 and 5 January 1949. All of the banknotes were signed by Telaumbanua himself to ensure the authenticity of the banknotes.

=== People's Representative Council of Nias ===
On 19 November 1949, Yunan Nasution from the People's Representative Council of Sumatra, was sent to Nias to form the People's Representative Council of Nias, in accordance with the Law No. 22 of 1948. The committee was dissolved, and the position of Speaker was given ex officio to Telaumbanua.

== As the Regent of Nias ==
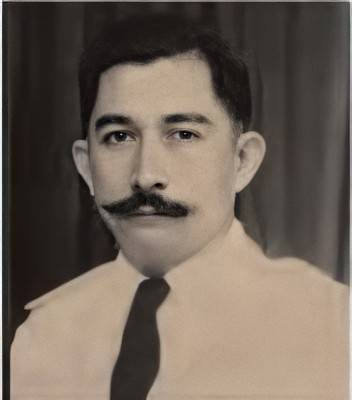
Telaumbanua as the Regent of Nias.

On 1 July 1950, the position of Head of Luhak was abolished. Telaumbanua was given the title of Regent, and the Luhak of Nias was transformed into the Nias Regency.

At the end of March 1950, the governor of the province of Tapanuli and East Sumatra, Ferdinand Lumban Tobing, went to Nias. He stated that although there had been a People's Representative Council in Nias, the position of the Speaker of the People's Representative Council was still held by the regent. Lumban Tobing thus requested that both positions should be separated in order to comply with the law.

Since 31 January 1954, Telaumbanua resigned from his position as the Regent of Nias, and was replaced by Humala Frederick Situmorang.

== Career (1954–1964) ==
After his resignation from his office, Telaumbanua seated several offices in North Sumatra. From 1954 until 1958, he was employed as the regent for decentralization and autonomy affairs in the office of the Governor of North Sumatra; 1958 until 1961 he was appointed as the Chairman of the North Sumatra Regional Development Coordinating Board; 1961 until 1962, he was appointed as the Resident of East Sumatra. He also participated in the formation of the Indonesian Red Cross Society of North Sumatra as its first chairman.

In 1962, he studied at the Indonesian Army Command and General Staff College, and was given the titular rank of major.

== Acting Mayor of Medan ==
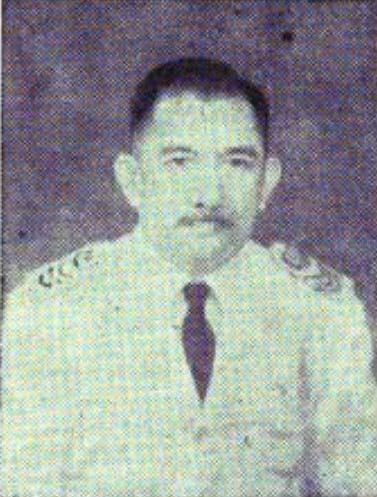
Roos Telaumbanua as the Mayor of Medan.

On 10 October 1964, Telaumbanua was appointed by the Governor of North Sumatra as the acting Mayor of Medan, replacing Basyrah Lubis. According to the Nefo magazine, Telaumbanua was appointed due to the lack of ethics and morality of the previous mayors of Medan. He resigned from the position on 27 August 1965.

== Acting Governor of North Sumatra ==
On 16 November 1965, Telaumbanua was appointed as the acting governor of North Sumatra, who replaced the previous governor Ulung Sitepu who was imprisoned for 24 years due to his alleged involvement in the 30 September Movement. He was tasked by the President to "carry out the politics of the New Order government, implementing the 1945 Constitution and Pancasila in a pure and consistent manner."

As acting governor, Telaumbanua began his term by "cleaning" the remainings of the 30 September Movement. He began dismissing and arresting civil employees who were alleged to be involved in the movement.

=== Pematangsiantar Mayor problem ===
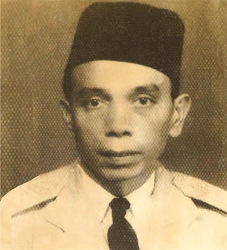
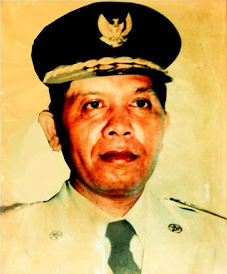
Both Tarip Siregar (left) and Mulatua Pardede (right) claimed themselves as the legitimate Mayor of Pematangsiantar.

On 29 December 1966, Telaumbanua appointed a new acting mayor, Mulatua Pardede, for the city of Pematangsiantar. His decision was disregarded by the acting mayor at the time, Tarip Siregar. This problem caused Pematangsiantar to de facto have two mayors. Siregar was supported by the popular youth movement in Pematangsiantar, such as the Pancasila Front and the Anti 30 September Movement Committee of Pematangsiantar, while Pardede was supported by Telaumbanua. The groups that supported Siregar sent a protest to the Interior Minister demanding to remove Pardede out of office. Telaumbanua defended himself by stating that he removed Siregar from his office as instructed by the military area commander of North Sumatra, on which the commander argued that Pematangsiantar had experienced lack of development during Siregar's term, and Siregar himself was in ill health.

The dual mayors in Pematangsiantar caused confusion to the civil employees working in the city, as both claimed that they were the legitimate mayor. Tarip Siregar insisted to remain in his office, forcing Pardede to hold office in the former Siantar Mayor's residence. Siregar brought this problem to Colonel Selamat Gintings, the Regional Military Commander, but he received no response.

In response to this problem, Arnold Baramuli from the Ministry of Internal Affairs was given full mandate by Telaumbanua to solve this problem. Baramuli decided that Pardede was the rightful acting mayor of Pematangsiantar. Thus, on 28 January 1967, a ceremony was planned to transfer the mayor position from Siregar to Pardede. Even though the ceremony was officially recognized, both Baramuli and Siregar did not attend the ceremony. Siregar was reported to be abducted by a group of unidentified youths.

=== Corruption and bribery allegations ===
At the end of his term, Telaumbanua was accused of accepting bribes amounting to 16 million rupiah (around $13,000) for giving a permit for building booths — which had been intended for building 16 public toilets — during his term as the acting Mayor, and several other accusations during his term as the acting Governor, such as abusing his power, manipulating copra shipments, and supply of rice. Further investigations also stated that he issued an order to form Barisan Sukarno (Sukarno Brigade) and that he was responsible for the escape of a prisoner.

Christian groups, such as the Sinar Harapan newspaper (newspaper owned by the Indonesian Christian Party), and the KESPEKRI, denied the allegations. Sinar Harapan stated that the allegations were fabricated by Chinese groups to foil Telaumbanua's nomination as the definitive Governor of North Sumatra, while KESPEKRI demonstrated its support to Telaumbanua over the case.

The Chief Prosecutor of North Sumatra, Djuang Harahap, summoned Telaumbanua over the corruption accusations, but after two occasions, Telaumbanua failed to show up to his trial. A delegation under E.M.L. Tobing attempted to stop the trial of Telaumbanua. The delegation threatened that pushing ahead with the trial could cause a "physical clash" that would endanger the safety of officials of the Chief Prosecutor's Office. Harahap replied to Tobing that he would not "bow down to such terrorism". Harahap's stance towards the threat was supported by the Sumatra NU Students' Union, and stating that the organization w prepared to face anybody who threatened the Chief Prosecutor's safety.

=== Nomination as Governor of North Sumatra ===
On 20 January 1967, the newspaper Angkatan Bersendjata (Armed Forces) reported that Telaumbanua was mentioned as possible candidates, among other 12 candidates. Soon, the number of candidates shrunk down. By January 24, Christian Lumbangaol, the regional secretary of North Sumatra, stated that there was only three possible candidates, namely Telaumbanua, Marah Halim Harahap, and Tumpal Dorianus Pardede. Telaumbanua and Pardede's candidacy was questioned by various groups, such as the Peasants' Action Committee and Central Indonesian Labor Action Front, due to Telaumbanua's corruption and bribery allegations, and Pardede's participation in the Dwikora cabinets.

The three candidates were officially nominated to the Regional People's Representative Council of North Sumatra. Harahap was nominated by Golkar, Telaumbanua by the Indonesian Christian Party, and Pardede by the Indonesian National Party. In an unofficial polling of the 39 members of the council, Harahap was supported by 15 members, Telaumbanua by 11 members, and Pardede by 4 members. Eleven members of the council did not support any of the candidates but stated they would take part in the upcoming elections.

The election was held on 6 February 1967. Harahap won the elections by 24 votes, while Telaumbanua only obtained 14 votes. One member abstained from the election, and the Indonesian National Party withdrawn Pardede's candidacy.

As Telaumbanua lost the elections, the Indonesian Christian Party nominated Telaumbanua as the Deputy Governor instead. His nomination as the Deputy Governor was not approved by the Ministry of Internal Affairs, and sparked protests from various organizations in North Sumatra.

== Later life ==
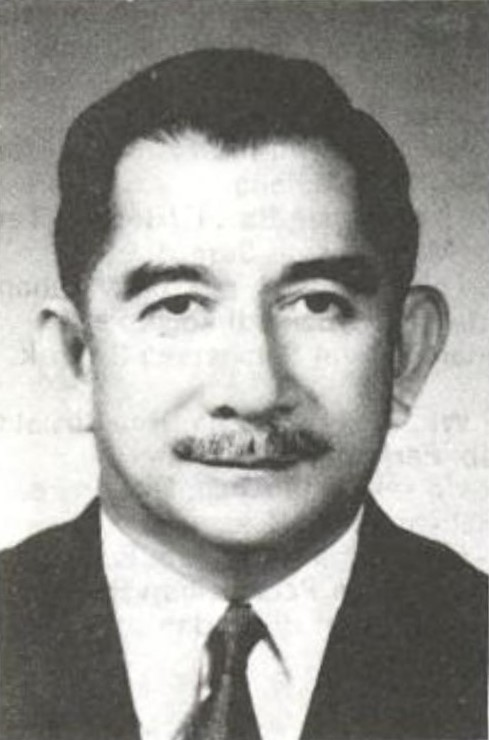
Telaumbanua as a member of the DPR

After the inauguration of Marah Halim Harahap on 30 March 1967, Telaumbanua moved to Jakarta, and became an expert staff in the Ministry of Internal Affairs. During this period, he became the member of the Executive Council of the Indonesian Christian Party.

In 1970, he moved to Golkar, and was nominated on 1971 for the People's Representative Council from the organization for the 1971 Indonesian legislative election. He was elected as the member of the People's Representative Council, representing Nias.

After his term ended on 1 October 1977, he returned to Nias in 1981. He died on 16 February 1987 in Gunungsitoli.

== Personal ==
He was married to Ramina Barasi Zebua. The marriage resulted in twelve children.

== Legacy ==
By the people of Nias, Telaumbanua was given the title of Balugu Sofutöngahönö.

His name was proposed for the name of a street in Medan.

== Bibliography ==
- Information Bureau of North Sumatra (1953), Republik Indonesia: Propinsi Sumatera Utara (in Indonesian), Medan: Ministry of Information
- Panitia Almanak Pemerintah Daerah Propinsi Sumatera Utara (1969), Almanak Pemerintah Daerah Propinsi Sumatera Utara, Medan: Government of North Sumatra
- Tuk Wan Haria, Muhammad (2006), Gubernur Sumatera dan Para Gubernur Sumatera Utara [The Governor of Sumatra and the Governors of North Sumatra] (in Indonesian), Medan: Library and Regional Archives Bureau of North Sumatra, ISBN 9789791521208
- General Elections Institution (1973), Pemilihan Umum 1971 (in Indonesian), Jakarta: General Elections Institution
- General Elections Institution (1972), Riwayat Hidup Anggota-Anggota Majelis Permusyawaratan Rakyat Hasil Pemilihan Umum 1971, Jakarta: General Elections Institution
- Laoli, Citra Arniathy (2014), TINJAUAN HISTORIS TERHADAP SOSOK PR. TELAUMBANUA (GUBERNUR SUMATERA UTARA 1965-1967) (in Indonesian), Medan: Universitas Negeri Medan
- Darsono; Astiyah, Siti; Azhari, Ichwan; Suryanti, Enny Tin; Akbar, Allan (October 2017), Berjuang Dengan Uang Mempertahankan dan Memajukan Republik Indonesia: Semangat Juang Otoritas dan Masyarakat Sumatera Utara, Jakarta: Bank Indonesia
- Simorangkir, J.C.T. (1989), Manuscript Sejarah Parkindo [Manuscript of the History of Parkindo] (in Indonesian), Jakarta: Yayasan Komunikasi
- Regional Cultural Inventory and Documentation Project (1983), Sejarah Pengaruh Pelita Terhadap Kehidupan Masyarakat Pedesaan di Daerah Sumatra Utara (PDF) (in Indonesian), Jakarta: Department of Education and Culture
