= Marah Halim Harahap =

Indonesian general, politician, and governor

Major General Marah Halim Harahap
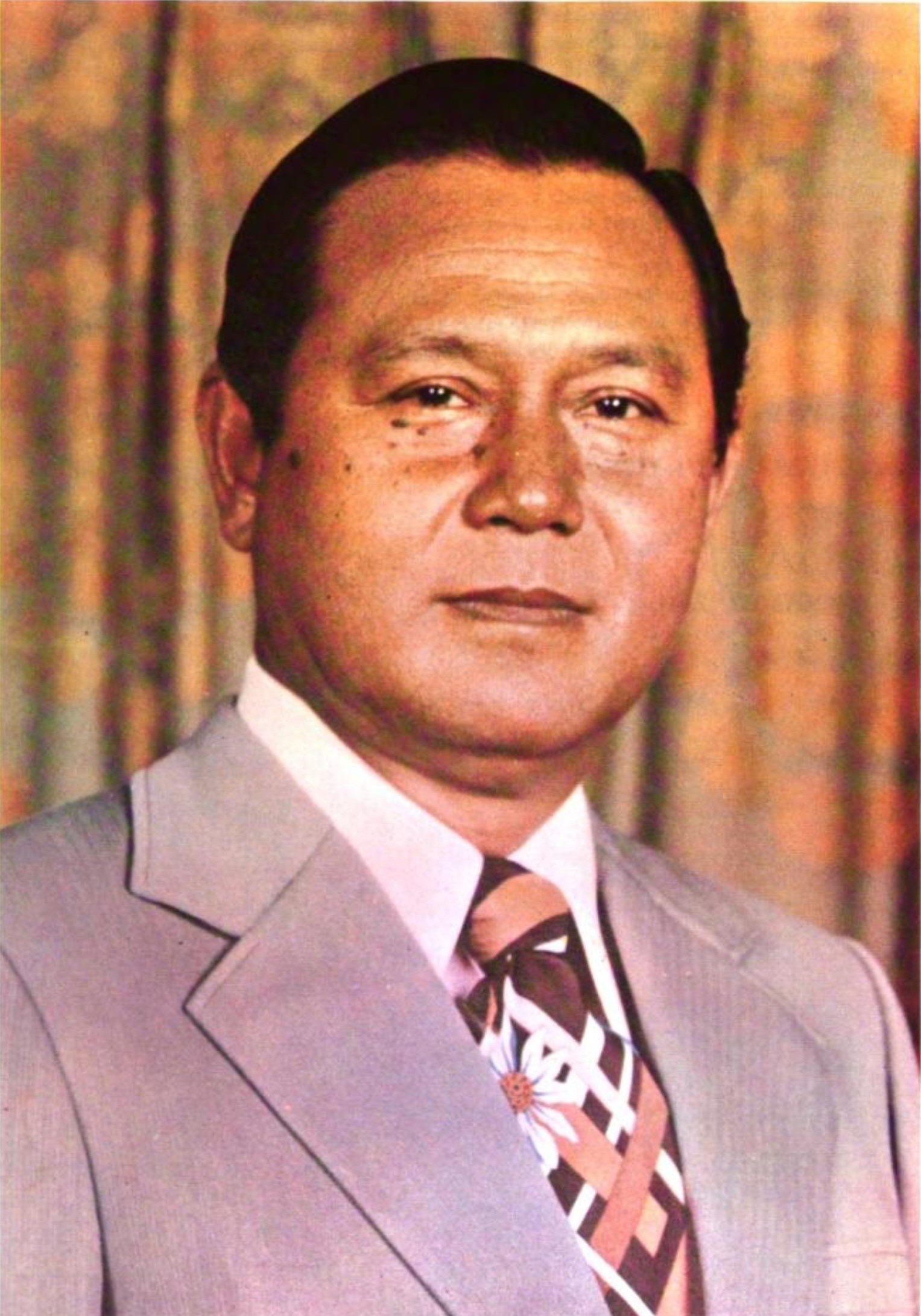
- Marah Halim Harahap, c. 1976

Governor of North Sumatra
- In office 30 March 1967 – 12 June 1978
- President: Suharto
- Preceded by: Ulung Sitepu; Roos Telaumbanua (acting)
- Succeeded by: Edward Waldemar Pahala Tambunan

Personal details
- Born: 28 February 1921 Tabusira, East Angkola, Residentie Tapanoeli, Dutch East Indies
- Died: 3 December 2015 (aged 94) Medan, North Sumatra

Military service
- Allegiance: Indonesia
- Branch/service: Army
- Years of service: 1945–1966
- Rank: Major General
- Battles/wars: Indonesian National Revolution

Major General Marah Halim Harahap (28 February 1921 – 3 December 2015) was an Indonesian general, politician, and governor. He was the Governor of North Sumatra from 1967 until 1978. Under his leadership, North Sumatra recovered from the 30 September Movement and organized an association football tournament named for him which was internationally recognized by FIFA.

== Early life ==
Harahap was born on 28 February 1921 in Tabusira. He was the fourth of the six children of Jabbar Harahap, a common farmer in Tabusira.

In Tabusira, there was only one elementary school in the village, which was built by the villagers. Even though elementary schools at that time had six grades, the elementary school in the village had only three grades. Harahap enrolled in the school and graduated from there in 1939.

He wished to study at the Meer Uitgebreid Lager Onderwijs, but because lack of means by his parents, Harahap opted to search for a job in Medan, the capital of Sumatra at the time. He followed his older brother, Sjamsoedin, who was already in Medan.

== Career ==
Due to transportation problems, Harahap only reached the city of Pematangsiantar. He was employed as a worker at a plantation in Pematangsiantar. At first, he applied to be a clerk at the plantation, but his employer rejected his application due to Harahap's lack of education.

After several months working on the plantation, he moved on to Medan. In Medan, he lived with Sjamsoedin and planned to enlist in the Japanese military, which at that time had occupied Medan.

== Military career ==
Shortly after the Indonesian independence, Harahap joined the Barisan Pemuda paramilitary organization. The organization would later fuse into the Indonesian National Armed Forces, and during the First Dutch Military Aggression, Harahap was appointed as a lieutenant.

After the sovereignty recognition of Indonesia in 1949, Harahap was assigned to the military headquarters in Medan and became a staff officer in the headquarters. He became a captain sometime between 1951 and 1953.

During Abdul Hakim's term as the Governor of North Sumatra, Harahap was the only military personnel able to enter and leave at any time in the Governor's house. Abdul Hakim maintained a close relationship with Harahap, and in 1952, Harahap was appointed as a military judge in Kuta Raja, Aceh.

From 1945 until 1966, Harahap was assigned to different positions in the military:

- 1945–1950 : Company Commander in Selat Panjang, Battalion commander in Bengkalis, Battalion Commander in Rengat, Commander of the Mobile Troops IV Riau in Rengat
- 1950–1952 : Battalion Commander/Field Commander in Pekanbaru and Battalion Commander in Tanjung Uban
- 1952–1954 : Chief of Staff of the Regiment in Banda Aceh, Regiment Commander for the Aceh Sub-Territory, Chief of Staff of the Bukit Barisan Regional Command
- 1959–1965 : Military attaché of Indonesia for Pakistan and Iran, Assistant IV for the Inter-Regional Command Chief of Staff of Sumatra
- 1965–1966 : Army Inspector General III for Sumatra

== Governor of North Sumatra ==
=== Election ===
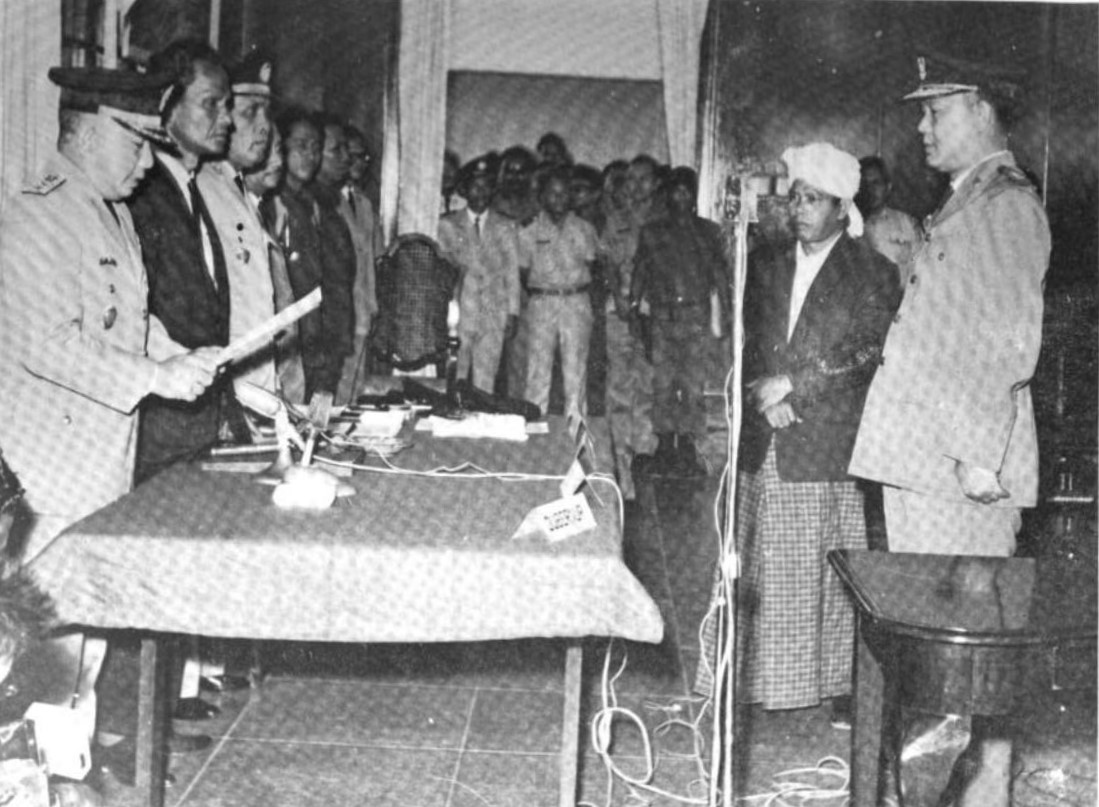
Inauguration of Marah Halim Harahap as Governor of North Sumatra on 30 March 1967.

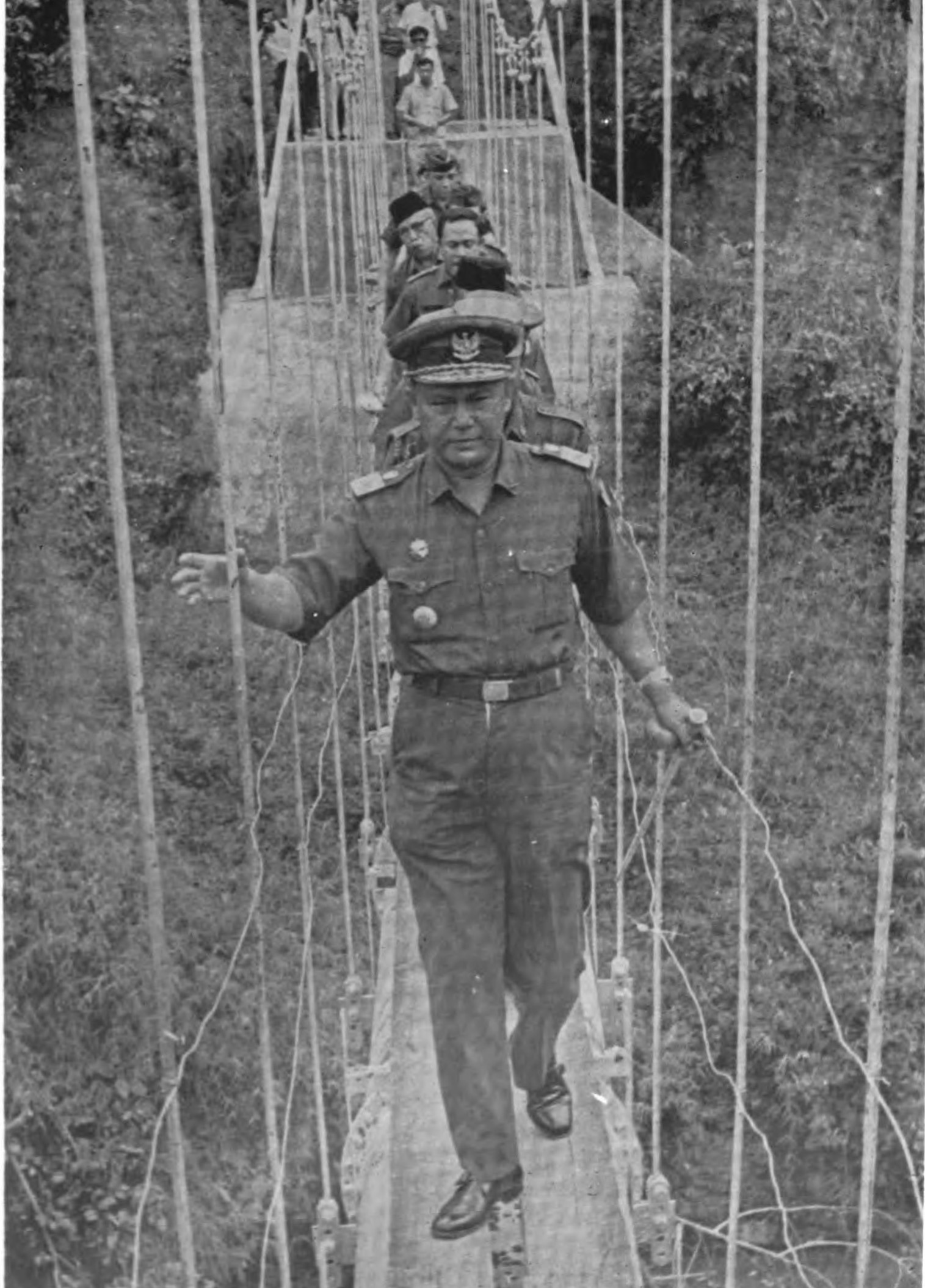
Harahap (front) crossing a hanging bridge in South Tapanuli.

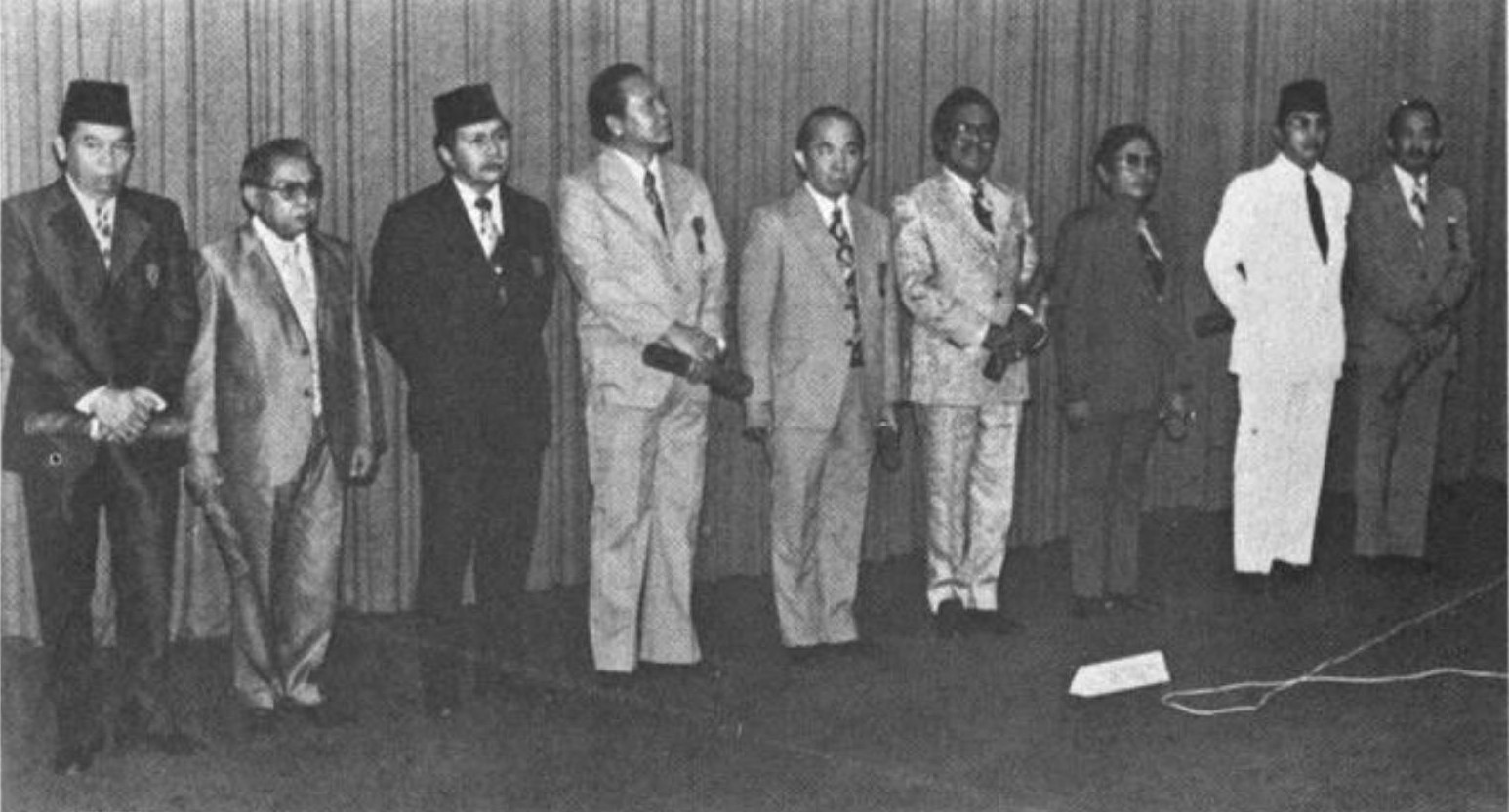
Harahap (fourth from left) receiving the Satya Lancana Pembangunan (Development Medal) in 1977.

Harahap was nominated as the Governor of North Sumatra by the Golkar fraction in the North Sumatra Regional People's Representative Council. Outside the fraction, the Indonesian Christian Partynominated Pandita Roos Telaumbanua, the previous acting governor of North Sumatra, and the Indonesian National Party nominated Tumpal Dorianus Pardede, a former minister in the Revised Dwikora Cabinet.

At the election held by the North Sumatra Regional People's Representative Council on 6 February 1967, the Indonesian National Party withdrew Tumpal Dorianus Pardede from the election. Harahap won the election by 24 votes, as opposed to Telaumbanua who obtained 14 votes. Harahap was inaugurated on 30 March 1967, by Soenandar Prijosoedarmo, representing the Ministry of Internal Affairs. The inauguration was attended by the previous governor, Telaumbanua.

After his first five-year term expired, Harahap was appointed temporarily as an acting governor for North Sumatra until a new governor was elected by the council. The council unanimously elected Marah Halim Harahap as the governor of North Sumatra for his second term on 6 November 1972. He was installed by the Minister of Internal Affairs, Amirmachmud, on 4 December 1972.

=== First Five-Year Development Plan ===
Between 1969 and 1974, the First Five-Year Development Plan in the province of North Sumatra was enacted. Harahap introduced the Three Programs for the Basics of the Regional Government of North Sumatra, which consists of:

1. Improvement of government apparatus in North Sumatra as the main executor of development programs in the region.
2. Rehabilitation and improvement of economic infrastructure and facilities with the target of increasing the flow of economic traffic, expediting the means of production, stabilizing the economy, in general, and supplying necessities for the daily community.
3. Foster mental and spiritual development to restore the values of life to the basic Pancasila and the 1945 Constitution purely.

=== Infrastructure development ===
During his rule, the territory of North Sumatra received a sudden increase in funds allocated by the central government. Harahap used the funds to construct various buildings in North Sumatra, such as various sports venues in regencies all over Sumatra, a film studio in Sunggal, Medan, and a reporters' hall in Medan.

The University of North Sumatra, one of the main universities in North Sumatra, was renovated by the government. New buildings in the university complex, such as lecture halls, laboratories, lecturer houses, student dormitories, Student Council buildings, language laboratories, and Research Center, were constructed by the government.

=== Marah Halim Cup ===
During his leadership, Harahap envisioned an international grade association football tournament held in North Sumatra. He invited former managers of the PSMS Medan, the local football team in Medan, namely Kamaruddin Panggabean, Tumpal Dorianus Pardede, and Muslim Harahap. To them, Harahap states that he was inspired by the Matthewson Beker Tournament, which was a former tournament held in Medan, during the Dutch East Indies era. Thus, Panggabean advised Harahap that the future tournaments should be named as Marah Halim Cup. Harahap and others agreed to Panggabean's advice, and soon, preparations for the tournament began.

Harahap then instructed Tumpal Dorianus Pardede to build international-class hotels in Medan and Parapat for the accommodation of players in the Marah Halim Cup. The first Marah Halim Cup was held on 7 April 1972 in Medan, North Sumatra. International teams from Singapore, Malaysia, Thailand, Burma, and Hongkong, began participating in the second tournament held in 1973.

=== Government organization ===
Harahap enacted several policies to restructure the government organization of North Sumatra. For example, the status of the Special Directorate for Social and Political Affairs was upgraded to the Office for Social and Political Affairs. This office would advise the governor and handle social affairs. Mayor Wahab Abdi seated the position as the head of the Office for Social and Political Affairs.

Harahap created new positions inside the Government of North Sumatra. The position of personal secretary to the governor was created, and former Special Assistant to the Governor Lukman Ahmadi was seated to the position. Another position, known as the Junior Governor, was created to assist the Governor. Regional Secretary of North Sumatra Djamaluddin Tambunan was appointed as the Junior Governor. He was tasked to replace Harahap's position whenever Harahap went for a work trip.

== Death ==
Since 2005, Harahap was diagnosed with stroke. He died at 06.00, on 3 December 2015, at his residency in Sakti Lubis Street 10, Medan.

== Bibliography ==
- Arianto, Eri (2015), MARAH HALIM CUP 1972 – 1995 (PDF)
- Tuk Wan Haria, Muhammad (2006), Gubernur Sumatera dan Para Gubernur Sumatera Utara [The Governor of Sumatra and the Governors of North Sumatra] (in Indonesian), Medan: Library and Regional Archives Bureau of North Sumatra, ISBN 9789791521208
- General Elections Institution (1972), Riwayat Hidup Anggota-Anggota Majelis Permusyawaratan Rakyat Hasil Pemilihan Umum 1971, Jakarta: General Elections Institution
