= Abdul Hakim Harahap =

Indonesian politician (1905–1961)

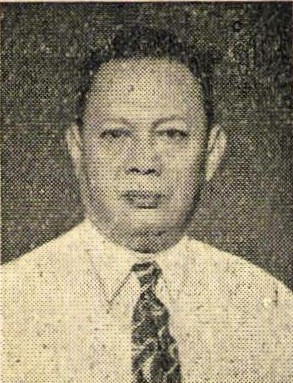
- Official portrait, c. 1956

3rd Governor of North Sumatra
- In office 25 January 1951 – 23 October 1953
- Preceded by: Sarimin Reksodihardjo
- Succeeded by: S. M. Amin Nasution

4th Deputy Prime Minister of Indonesia
- In office 21 January – 15 August 1950
- Prime Minister: Abdul Halim
- Preceded by: Sjafruddin Prawiranegara
- Succeeded by: Hamengkubuwono IX

Other offices
- 1956–1960: Member of the People's Representative Council
- 1955–1956: Minister of State

Personal details
- Born: 15 July 1905 Sarolangun, Dutch East Indies
- Died: 7 October 1961 (aged 56) Jakarta, Indonesia
- Party: Masyumi Party
- Spouse: Mariana Lubis

Abdul Hakim Harahap (15 July 1905 – 7 October 1961) was an Indonesian politician who held various positions, including deputy prime minister, in the 1950s.

Born in Sarolangun to a Batak father and mother, Abdul Hakim Harahap was employed in the customs and excises office after finishing his studies at the Prins Hendrikschool. After the Indonesian independence, he was appointed as the member of the People's Representative Council of North Sumatra, .

== Early life ==
Harahap was born on 15 July 1905 in Sarolangun, Jambi. He was the son of Mangaradja Gading, a Batak civil employee. He was the second child of the six.

After Harahap's birth, Mangaradja Gading moved to the Jambi city. In the city, Mangaradja Gading enlisted Harahap to the Europeesche Lagere School (ELS, European Primary School) in 1914, to follow his older brother that had already study there. He only studied for two years there, as his father was transferred to the city of Sibolga in 1916.

In Sibolga, Mangaradja Gading was still employed as a civil employee, but with a higher rank. Abdul Hakim continued his ELS at Sibolga. He graduated from the school in 1920, and continued studying at the Meer Uitgebreid Lager Onderwijs (literally Extensive Primary Education, equal to Junior High School). He graduated from the school in 1924, and went to the Prins Hendrikschool (Prince Hendrik School, high school for economy) until 1926.

During this time, he was involved in the nationalist movements in the Dutch East Indies, such as Jong Islamieten Bond (Young Islamic Association), Jong Batak Bond (Young Bataks) and Jong Sumatra Bond (Young Sumatran Association).

== In the Dutch East Indies ==
After his graduation from the Prins Hendrikschool, he briefly took a course about customs and excises. After completing the course, in 1927, he was employed at the customs and excises office in Medan.

During his time in Medan, he stood as the candidate for the alderman of the Medan Gemeenteraad (municipal assembly) election in 1930. He was elected to the council, obtaining 131 votes out of 408. He was elected again in 1934, this time obtaining 365 votes.

Alongside his job as an alderman of the Gementeraad, he opened French and English lessons. He also contributed to the funding of several central markets and public hospitals.

He resigned from the position in 1937, after being transferred to Batavia to work as a functionary in the Department of Finance. In Batavia, he met with his old colleagues from the Jong Batak organization. They discussed how their homeland in North Sumatra, Tapanuli, was less developed than East Sumatra, due to the Bataks living in Tapanuli opted to start their career in Medan, East Sumatra. Thus, the Committee for the Development of Tapanuli was set up, with Harahap being one of its members.

In 1941, due to the oncoming Japanese threat to the Dutch East Indies, Harahap was appointed as the deputy head of the financial department in Pontianak. He was moved to Makassar 6 months later with the same position.

== During the Japanese occupation ==
After the Japanese occupation, he was still employed by the Japanese in his previous position, only with a different name. The Department of Finance has changed the name to the Kosei Kyoku and Kaikeikyoku (Bureau of Welfare and Finance). Due to his proficient job, he was transferred to Tarutung, the capital of Tapanuli, as the secretary of the Tapanuli Council.

== Indonesian National Revolution ==
After the independence of Indonesia, he joined the Masyumi Party. Shortly after, he was appointed by the Resident of Tapanuli, Ferdinand Lumban Tobing, as the deputy resident of Tapanuli. He was tasked by Lumban Tobing to handle political and economic task. In his capacity, he began printing the "Money of the Republic of Indonesia for Tapanuli" (ORITA, Oeang Republik Indonesia Tapanoeli) as a way to maintain financial stability in the residency. The money was printed by hand, but the signature was manually signed. Initially, Harahap himself signed the money, but after being tired of signing all of the money, he tasked his aide with the job.

Due to the successful monetary system that Harahap has created, Mohammad Hatta, the vice president of Indonesia, appointed him as the resident of Riau. As there was no running government in Riau, he refused the appointment, stating that he "didn't want to govern a place without any government". Hatta threatened to remove Harahap from his position if he didn't accepted the appointment. He still didn't accepted the appointment, so he was removed from the position. After the removal, he was chosen as the member of the Central Indonesian National Committee, representing Sumatra. He went to Jakarta to attend the Central Indonesian National Committee session in Malang.

He returned to Tapanuli after attending the session. On 12 December 1948, Harahap was inaugurated as one of the 45 members of the People's Representative Council of North Sumatra.

During the Round Table Conference, Harahap was appointed as one of the general advisor to the Indonesian delegates.

== Deputy Prime Minister of Indonesia ==
On 22 January 1950, Harahap was inaugurated as the Deputy Prime Minister of the Republic of Indonesia in the Halim Cabinet.

During his tenure, he was involved in the dissolution of the United States of Indonesia and restore the unitary state. In his statement on 8 May 1950, he pointed out that the Republic of Indonesia must led the dissolution process and that all of the other federal states shall bear the results of the dissolution.

The cabinet resigned after the formal dissolution of the United States of Indonesia on 15 August 1950.

== Ambassador of Indonesia to Pakistan ==
On 28 October 1950, he was appointed by the president as the ambassador of Indonesia to Pakistan, replacing the late Syamsuddin.

== Governor of North Sumatra ==
On 25 January 1951, Harahap was inaugurated as the Governor of North Sumatra by Makmun Sumadipradja, representing the Minister of Internal Affairs, Assaat. He was the first definitive governor of North Sumatra, after the abolishment of the post and the appointment of Sarimin Reksodihardjo as the acting governor.

=== Work trip and problems ===
Shortly after his inauguration, he went on a work trip around North Sumatra. Between January and February 1950, he went to Aceh and Tapanuli. In Aceh, Harahap faced problems regarding to the irrigations, education, transportation, and health affairs. He also heard several demands from the Achense people who wants autonomy in the region.

After his work trip, he began improving the government system in North Sumatra. He appointed several coordinating residents for Aceh and Tapanuli, while the coordinating resident for East Sumatra is seated in the governor's office.

He refused to continue the agrarian program enacted by the previous governor, Sarimin Reksodihardjo, by stating that "agrarian affairs is handled by the central government". He also faced problems about labor force and veteran, both of which complained that they weren't being treated by the government.

=== Constructions ===
To repair the post-war condition of North Sumatra, the government began to build institutions aimed to improve standard of living. In 1951, Abdul Hakim began the construction of the Teladan Stadium, which was eventually finished in 1953. He also established several universities in North Sumatra, namely the University of North Sumatra and the Indonesian Islamic College.

== Later life ==
Harahap participated in the 1955 Indonesian legislative election. He was elected as the member of the People's Representative Council from North Sumatra, representing Masyumi. After the council was dissolved in 1959, he was appointed as the member of the transitional People's Representative Council, until the council was dissolved on 24 June 1960.

== Bibliography ==
- Tuk Wan Haria, Muhammad (2006), Gubernur Sumatera dan Para Gubernur Sumatera Utara [The Governor of Sumatra and the Governors of North Sumatra] (in Indonesian), Medan: Library and Regional Archives Bureau of North Sumatra, ISBN 9789791521208
- Maryana, Amira (2011), Amira Maryana dan Tokoh Sejarah, Abdul Hakim (in Indonesian)
- Information Bureau of North Sumatra (1953), Republik Indonesia: Propinsi Sumatera Utara (in Indonesian), Medan: Ministry of Information
- Ministry of Information (1950), Kabinet Republik Indonesia (in Indonesian), Jakarta
- Tim Penyusun Sejarah (1970), Seperempat Abad Dewan Perwakilan Rakyat Republik Indonesia [A Quarter Century of the People's Representative Council of the Republic of Indonesia] (PDF) (in Indonesian), Jakarta: Sekretariat DPR-GR, archived from the original (PDF) on 7 April 2023
- Parlaungan (1956), Hasil Rakjat Memilih Tokoh-tokoh Parlemen (Hasil Pemilihan Umum Pertama – 1955) di Republik Indonesia (PDF) (in Indonesian), Jakarta, archived (PDF) from the original on 23 July 2019
