= Ulung Sitepu =

Indonesian general and politician imprisoned in the wake of the 30 September Movement

Brigadier General Ulung Sitepu
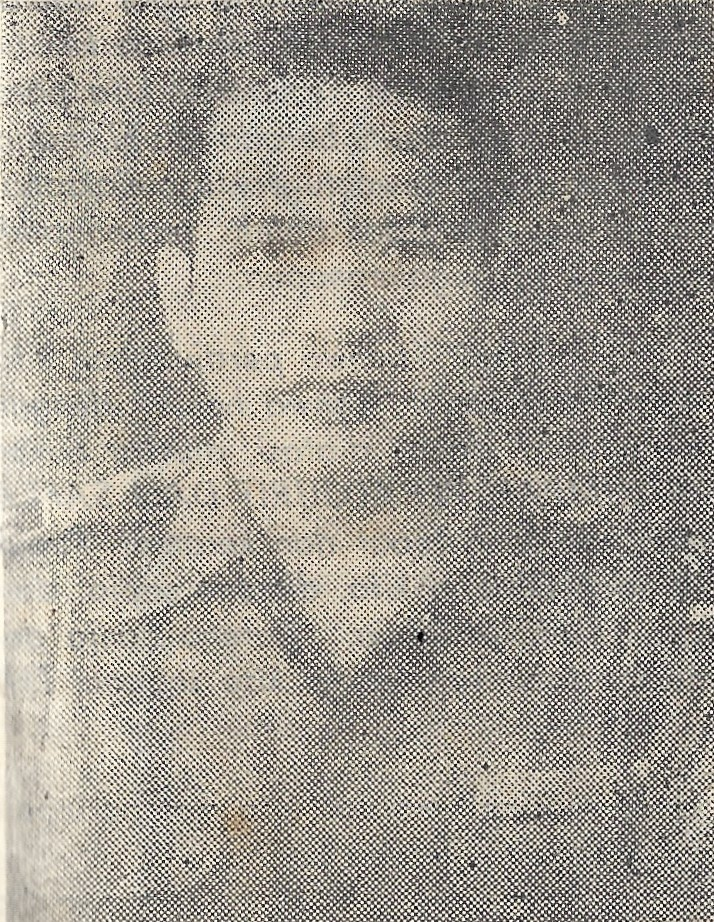

Governor of North Sumatra
- In office 15 July 1963 – 16 November 1965
- President: Suharto
- Preceded by: Raja Junjungan Lubis; Eny Karim (acting)
- Succeeded by: Roos Telaumbanua (acting); Marah Halim Harahap

Member of the Provisional People's Consultative Assembly
- In office 15 September 1960 – 15 July 1963

Personal details
- Born: 1917
- Died: (unknown)

Military service
- Allegiance: Indonesia
- Branch/service: Army
- Years of service: 1945–1965
- Rank: Brigadier General
- Battles/wars: Indonesian National Revolution

Ulung Sitepu was an Indonesian general and politician who served as the governor of North Sumatra from 1963 until 1965. Following the 30 September Movement, he was arrested and accused of supporting the movement. He was sentenced to death, but the sentence was later reduced to life imprisonment.

== Member of the Provisional People's Consultative Assembly ==
Sitepu was inaugurated as a member of the Provisional People's Consultative Assembly, representing the Functional Groups, on 15 September 1960. He held the office until his election as the Governor of North Sumatra.

== Governor of North Sumatra ==
Sitepu's nomination as the Governor of North Sumatra was supported by the Indonesian Communist Party faction in North Sumatra. He was inaugurated as Governor on 15 July 1963.

During his tenure as the governor, Sitepu fully supported the inaugural Games of the New Emerging Forces, held in Jakarta. He began raising funds in North Sumatra and managed to raise 50 million rupiahs for the games. Aside from the financial donation, he also donated 2400 bottles of passion fruit drinks and dozens of ulos for the games.

=== Protests ===
Sitepu faced protests from a group of demonstrators under the command of Yan Paruhum Lubis. The demonstrators accused Sitepu of appropriating funds for the construction of a public toilet in North Sumatra's central market. Sitepu ordered the arrest of Lubis, who was detained for one week. Lubis was released due to the help of Kosen Cokrosentono, a military lecturer.

== Arrest and imprisonment ==
Following the 30 September Movement, Sitepu expressed his support for the movement by congratulating its leader, Untung Syamsuri, and pledging his allegiance to the movement. After the crackdown against the movement, Sitepu fled Medan, the capital of North Sumatra, on 8 September 1965 to Kabanjahe in Karo. He was arrested and brought to Jakarta on 4 November 1965. He was brought back to Medan to be tried by an Extraordinary Military Court in September 1966. The court sentenced him to death; in 1980 the sentence was commuted by President Suharto to life imprisonment. Sitepu was incarcerated in the Tanjung Gusta Prison in Medan.

== Doubts as a communist ==
Researchers from the University of North Sumatra cast doubt on the accusation of Sitepu being a communist. The researchers pointed out that there is no consensus on whether Sitepu was arrested because he gave political advantages to members of the Indonesian Communist Party or because he was trusted by Sukarno.

== Bibliography ==
- Tuk Wan Haria, Muhammad (2006), Gubernur Sumatera dan Para Gubernur Sumatera Utara [Governor of Sumatra and Governors of North Sumatra] (in Indonesian), Medan: Library and Regional Archives Bureau of North Sumatra, ISBN 9789791521208
- Agustono, Budi; Syofian, Eddy; Takari, Muhammad; Dewi, Heritina; Harahap, Fitriaty; Yulhasni; Sumarno, Edi (2013), Para Gubernur Sumatera Utara: Kajian Sejarah, Sosial, dan Budaya [Governors of North Sumatra: Historical, Social, and Cultural Assessment] (in Indonesian), Medan: University of North Sumatra
- Dahlan, Budiman M. (2016), Ganefo: Olimpiade Kiri di Indonesia [Ganefo: The Leftist Olympics in Indonesia] (in Indonesian), Yogyakarta: Warung Arsip
- Central Intelligence Agency (December 1968), Indonesia-1965: The Coup that Backfired (in Indonesian), Washington D.C.: Central Intelligence Agency
