= Pieter Sibarani =

Indonesian politician

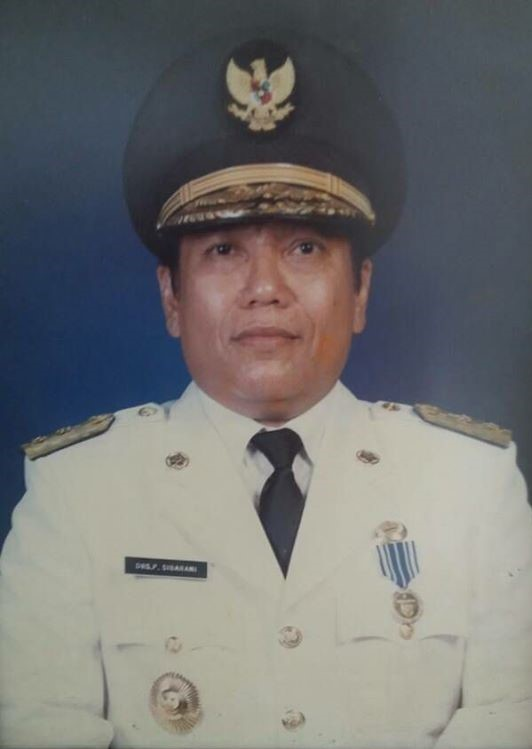

3rd Vice Governor of North Sumatra
- In office 31 May 1994 – October 1999
- President: Soeharto; B.J. Habibie
- Governor: Raja Inal Siregar; Tengku Rizal Nurdin
- Preceded by: Alimuddin Simanjuntak
- Succeeded by: Lundu Panjaitan; Abdul Wahab Dalimunthe

Personal details
- Born: March 19, 1938 Laguboti, Bataklanden, Sumatra, Dutch East Indies
- Died: June 9, 2017 (aged 79) Medan, North Sumatra, Indonesia
- Resting place: Taman Eden, Tanjung Morawa, North Sumatra, Indonesia
- Party: Golkar
- Spouse: Adelaide née Pardede

Pieter Sibarani (19 March 1938 — 9 June 2017) was an Indonesian politician and bureaucrat who served as the Vice Governor of North Sumatra from 1994 until 1999.

== Early life ==
Pieter Sibarani was born on 19 March 1938 in the village of Laguboti. He began his education at the Sekolah Rakjat (People's School, equivalent to elementary school) in Medan, and graduated from the school in 1952. He continued his studies at the SMP Negeri III (Junior High School No. 3) in Medan, and graduated in 1956. He then moved to the town of Balige, and studied at a high school owned by the Batak Christian Protestant Church in the town. He graduated from the high school in 1959.

After graduating from the high school, Pieter enrolled at the Social and Political Faculty of the Gadjah Mada University. Although he was accepted to study at the university, he was broke and could not pay for the tuition fee. His friends encouraged him to come directly to the rector of the university about the matter. He followed the advice of his friends, and the rector allowed him to pay later. According to Sibarani, he was praised by his friends for his bravery to meet the rector. He later graduated from the university in 1966.

== Career ==
After graduating from the university, he returned to North Sumatra, and began his career as a civil servant. From 1966 until 1968, he was employed as the financial supervisor for the Government of North Sumatra. Two years later, in 1968, he was transferred and became the special staff for Chinese affairs in economy. He was later reassigned to the post as the Head of the Supply and Transport Bureau of the Regional Electoral Committee for the 1971 election.

Following the election, he was assigned as the Head of the Protocol and Journey Affairs of the Government of North Sumatra, and held the office for five years until 1976. From 1976 until 1989, Sibarani was appointed for different positions, namely the member of the expert group of the Government of North Sumatra (1976—1980), Assistant Inspector at the Inspectorate of the Government of North Sumatra (1980—1981), Head of the Population and Environment Bureau of North Sumatra (1981—1987), Head of the Village Development Bureau of North Sumatra (1987—1988), and Head of the Regional Government Bureau of North Sumatra (1988—1989).

In 1989, he was appointed by the Governor of North Sumatra Raja Inal Siregar as the Assistant to the Governor of North Sumatra for the 1st Territory, which covers the regency of South Tapanuli, Central Tapanuli, Nias, and the city of Sibolga. He held the office until 1992, when he was appointed as the Assistant for Economy and Development at the Regional Secretariat of North Sumatra.

Sibarani was named as a possible candidate for the Governor of North Sumatra, but he did not make it into the gubernatorial election. Incumbent governor Raja Inal Siregar won the election.

== Vice Governor of North Sumatra ==
On 31 May 1994, Sibarani was inaugurated as the Vice Governor of North Sumatra. He was inaugurated by the Minister of Internal Affairs Yogie Suardi Memet alongside Suwarna AF as the Vice Governor of East Kalimantan and Rivaie Rachman as the Vice Governor of Riau. His term ended in October 1999, when he was replaced by two vice governors, namely Lundu Panjaitan and Abdul Wahab Dalimunthe.

== Academic career ==
Sibarani also taught at universities in North Sumatra. From 1967 until 1989, he became the adjunct lecturer at the HKBP Nommensen University in Medan. In 1984, he also became the adjunct lecturer at the Social and Political Faculty in the University of North Sumatra. He resigned from his position as adjunct lecturer due to his appointment as the assistant to the Governor of North Sumatra.

== Death ==
Sibarani died at the age of 79 on 9 June 2017 at his home in Medan. He was treated for parkinson since 3 years before his death. Former Vice Governor Lundu Panjaitan led the condolences services for Sibarani, which was held two days after his death.

Sibarani was buried at the Taman Eden Cemetery in Tanjung Morawa on 12 June 2017.

== Family ==
Sibarani was married to Adelaide Pardede. The marriage resulted in four children, all daughters, namely E. Hanna Sibarani, Magdalena Sibarani, Lydia Triputri Sibarani and Grace Rosari Christiani Sibarani.

== Awards ==
=== Medal ===
Civil Service Long Service Medals, 2nd Class (1992)
Role Model Medal (1997)
Star of Service, 1st Class (1999)

=== Others ===
- Award from the Minister of Internal Affairs/Chairman of the General Elections Institution (1971)
- Award from the University of North Sumatra (1987)
- Manggala Karya Kencana from the State Minister of Population and Environment (1996)

== Bibliography ==
- Tim Penerbitan Buku 50 Tahun UGM (1999), Apa & siapa sejumlah alumni UGM [Who's Who of Several UGM Alumni] (in Indonesian), Jakarta, ISBN 9789798391835
- Tuk Wan Haria, Muhammad (2006), Gubernur Sumatera dan Para Gubernur Sumatera Utara [Governor of Sumatra and Governors of North Sumatra] (in Indonesian), Medan: Library and Regional Archives Bureau of North Sumatra, ISBN 9789791521208
