= Lundu Panjaitan =

Batak politician and bureaucrat

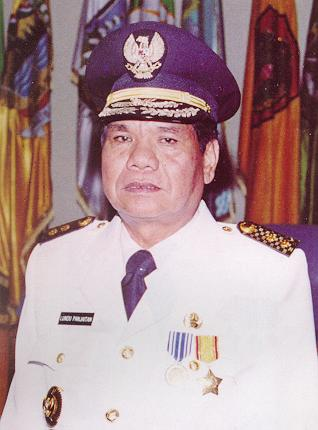

Member of the Regional Representative Council
- In office 3 March 2006 – 1 October 2009

5th Vice Governor of North Sumatra
- In office 16 June 1998 – 16 June 2003 Serving with Abdul Wahab Dalimunthe
- Governor: Tengku Rizal Nurdin
- Preceded by: Pieter Sibarani
- Succeeded by: Rudolf Pardede

Regent of North Tapanuli
- In office 16 February 1989 – 16 February 1994
- Preceded by: Gustav Sinaga
- Succeeded by: Tahan Sinaga

Regent of Central Tapanuli
- In office 5 September 1980 – 5 September 1985
- Preceded by: Bangun Siregar
- Succeeded by: Abdul Wahab Dalimunthe

Personal details
- Born: 9 April 1941 (age 83); Pangaribuan, North Tapanuli, Japanese Dutch East Indies

Lundu Panjaitan (born 9 April 1941) was a Batak politician and bureaucrat. He began his career in bureaucracy as the assistant for administrative affairs in the office of the Governor of North Sumatra and became the Regent of Central Tapanuli in 1980. Since then, he has been appointed to several high positions in North Sumatra, such as the Head of the Tourism Bureau of North Sumatra, Regent of North Tapanuli, Chairman of the Provincial Investment Coordinating Board of North Sumatra, and the Deputy Governor of North Sumatra.

He contested in the 2004 election as the candidate for the Regional Representative Council, but lost the election. Although he lost the election, he was called to replace the seat of Raja Inal Siregar, who died after a plane crash.

== Early life ==
Panjaitan was born on 9 April 1941 in the village of Pangaribuan, North Tapanuli, as the son of a farmer. He began to study at the People's School in 1953, Junior High School in 1956, and High School in 1959. After graduating from High School, Panjaitan continued his studies at the Law Faculty of the University of North Sumatra. He graduated from the university with a law degree.

During his time at the university, he joined the Indonesian National Student Movement.

== Career ==
After graduating, Panjaitan began to work in the office of the Governor of North Sumatra as the assistant for administration affairs. He also worked as a lawyer during this time. Due to his proficient skills as a lawyer, in 1978, he was promoted to the head of the Law and Government Organization Bureau.

During this time, Lundu also worked at the 17 August University as a lecturer.

== As the Regent of Central Tapanuli ==
Panjaitan was inaugurated as the Regent of Central Tapanuli on 5 September 1980. His term ended on 5 September 1985.

During his term as the Regent of Central Tapanuli, the central government of Indonesia began providing aid funds for villages in Indonesia. The funds were to be transferred to the head of the village via a bank account in the Bank Rakyat Indonesia. Panjaitan supports the aid, citing the example of the usage of the aid to fund the mutual assistance of around 5.000 villagers to build a road that could be crossed by buses and trucks. He also advised the government to oblige the head of the village to submit an official report to the regency government, so that the funds would not be embezzled.

After the expiration of his term as the Regent of Central Tapanuli, in 1986, Panjaitan was appointed by the Governor of North Sumatra as the Head of the Tourism Bureau of North Sumatra.

== As the Regent of North Tapanuli ==
On 16 February 1989, Panjaitan was inaugurated as the Regent of North Tapanuli. During this period, Panjaitan enacted several policies, such as the Safari Martabe, the construction of the Dalihan Na Tolu institution, and unifying the split inside the Batak Christian Protestant Church.

=== Martabe movement ===
The Martabe movement (abbreviation of Marsipature Hutana Be, literally Building Your Own Village) was first delivered in a speech by the Governor of North Sumatra, Raja Inal Siregar, in Sipirok on 24 December 1988. The main aim of the movement was to bring awareness regarding the development of their own homeland in North Sumatra to ethnic North Sumatran diasporas (perantau). The movement was officially announced with the name on 1 November 1989 in the village of Tanjung Ibus, Langkat Regency.

As North Tapanuli itself was ethnically dominated by Toba Batak people, Panjaitan aimed the movement to the Batak diaspora located outside North Sumatra and overseas. Panjaitan enacted another version of the Martabe movement, dubbed as Safari Martabe. Numerous government officials and villagers from North Tapanuli were brought to Jakarta as part of the Safari Martabe. A concert for the Safari Martabe was held at the Jakarta Convention Center. The concert had the motto Di Ingot Ho Dope? (Do You Still Remember?), and aiming to raise awareness from the Toba Bataknese diaspora about their native villages (Bona Pasogit). The concert successfully gained the total fund of 257 million rupiahs, and as of April 1991, the Martabe movement managed to gain 2.2 trillion rupiahs.

The funds that were gained via the Safari Martabe movement was allocated to the construction of several public facilities. New football fields in villages all over North Tapanuli were built, Toba Bataknese entrepreneurs funded the formation of a football association in North Tapanuli, and Toba Bataknese in the Boxing Commission of Indonesia lobbied to held the Indonesian Pro Boxing competition in Tarutung, the capital of North Tapanuli, which made Toga Simamora, an ethnic Toba Bataknese, to become the champion of the competition. Other constructions and reparations was enacted on roads, irrigation, worship places, educations, and agricultural fields.

=== Dalihan Na Tolu ===
Dalihan Na Tolu (three-legged furnace) was the three main philosophies of the Bataknese life. Panjaitan decided to embody this philosophy and combined it with the national ideology of Indonesia, Pancasila, in an organization. The Regional Decree of North Tapanuli No. 10 of 1990 was enacted, and became the legal basis for the organization.

Article 4 of the decree states that the organization was intended to accommodate the implementation of Pancasila in the traditional life of Toba Bataknese people in North Tapanuli, so that the traditions could be focused on the national development.

The Dalihan Na Tolu consisted of a chairman, some deputy chairman, a secretary, and several members, with a term length of 5 years. The members of Dalihan Na Tolu is appointed from traditional Bataknese figures.

== Member of the Regional Representative Council ==
Panjaitan nominated himself as the candidate for the Regional Representative Council in the 2004 Indonesian legislative election. Even though he obtained 217,838 votes (4.13% of the vote) and went in the 6th place, he did not won any seats.

His chance as the interim replacement came when two members of the Regional Representative Council from North Sumatra, Abdul Halim Harahap and Raja Inal Siregar, died in the Mandala Airlines Flight 091. In accordance to the law, if any Regional Representative Council members who have been inaugurated have either resigned or died, then the rank below him became the substitute. As Abdul Halim Harahap and Raja Inal Siregar were respectively ranked 1st and 3rd, with the 2nd and 4th rank has been given seat in the council, thus the 5th rank (Parlindungan Purba) and the 6th rank (Lundu Panjaitan) was eligible to replace Abdul Halim Harahap and Raja Inal Siregar respectively. Panjaitan and Purba was inaugurated as the member of the Regional Representative Council on 3 March 2006.

== Later life ==
After his term as the deputy governor has ended, Panjaitan became the independent commissar of the Toba Pulp Lestari company — a pulp company based in North Tapanuli — since 15 August 2003.

At the 2019 Indonesian general election, Panjaitan was appointed as the member of the board of the director of the Joko Widodo 2019 presidential campaign team's branch in North Sumatra.

== Bibliography ==
- Gultom, Hasudungan (2013). Peranan Lundu Panjaitan Dalam Pembangunan Di Tapanuli Utara Tahun 1989-1994 (undergraduate). Medan: Universitas Negeri Medan.
- Panitia Almanak Pemerintah Daerah Propinsi Sumatera Utara (1969). Almanak Pemerintah Daerah Propinsi Sumatera Utara. Medan: Government of North Sumatra.
- Tampubolon, Sahala; Silalahi, P.H.; Nainggolan, Rustam Effendy; Siregar, Yamin; Simanjuntak, Hercules (1991). Tapanuli Utara Membangun. Tarutung: Government of North Tapanuli with the Karya Pembangunan Institute.
