= Abdul Wahab Dalimunthe =

Indonesian bureaucrat and politician (1939–2021)

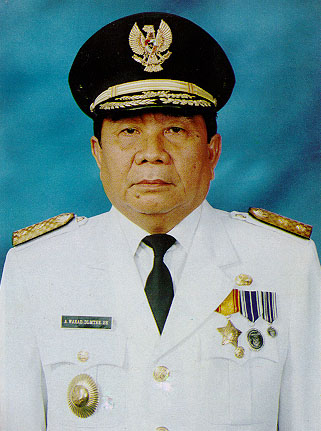

Member of the House of Representatives
- In office 6 April 2017 – 8 November 2021
- Preceded by: Ruhut Sitompul
- In office 1 October 2009 – 1 October 2014

Speaker of the North Sumatra Regional House of Representatives
- In office 8 October 2004 – 27 November 2008
- President: Megawati Soekarnoputri; Susilo Bambang Yudhoyono
- Governor: Tengku Rizal Nurdin; Rudolf Pardede; Syamsul Arifin
- Preceded by: Ahmad Azhari
- Succeeded by: Abdul Aziz Angkat

4th Vice Governor of North Sumatra
- In office 4 November 1997 – 16 June 2003 Serving with Pieter Sibarani (until 1999) and Lundu Panjaitan (from 1999)
- Governor: Tengku Rizal Nurdin
- Preceded by: Pieter Sibarani
- Succeeded by: Rudolf Pardede

Regent of Central Tapanuli
- In office 5 September 1985 – 5 September 1990
- Governor: Kaharuddin Nasution; Raja Inal Siregar
- Preceded by: Lundu Panjaitan
- Succeeded by: Amrun Daulay

Personal details
- Born: 10 January 1939 Rantau Prapat, North Sumatra, Indonesia
- Died: 8 November 2021 (aged 82) Medan, North Sumatra, Indonesia
- Party: Golkar (1999–2008); Democratic Party (2008–2021)
- Spouse: Atikah Abdul Wahab
- Education: University of North Sumatra

Abdul Wahab Dalimunthe (10 January 1939 – 8 November 2021) was an Indonesian bureaucrat and politician. He served as the Vice Governor of North Sumatra from 1997 until 2003, Speaker of the North Sumatra Regional House of Representatives (DPRD) from 2004 until 2008, and MP from 2009 to 2014 and from 2017 until his death.

== Early life ==
Abdul was born on 10 January 1939 in Rantau Prapat. He spent his childhood in his birthplace and moved to Medan to pursue high school education. He entered the University of North Sumatra in 1960 and graduated in 1966 with a law degree.

== Bureaucratic career ==
Four years after he graduated from the North Sumatra University (USU) in 1967, he became the Regional Secretary for Labuhan Batu Regency in 1971. He held the position until 1981 and was assigned to the general governance bureau by governor E.W.P. Tambunan.

After Tambunan was replaced by governor Kaharuddin Nasution, Abdul was appointed assistant for people's welfare for a year. During his brief stint as assistant, Abdul became the acting regent of Asahan. After that, Abdul was nominated for the office of the Regent of Central Tapanuli. He was elected by the local council and served for a five-year term until 1990.

Abdul continued his bureaucratic career after his term ended as the provincial inspector for North Sumatra from 1990 until 1994. Governor Raja Inal Siregar then promoted him to become the regional secretary, the highest bureaucratic post in the province. He became the vice governor of the province on 4 November 1997, serving alongside Pieter Sibarani. In the midst of his term as vice governor, Abdul was chosen as the chairman of the North Sumatra branch of the Golkar party.

== Political career ==
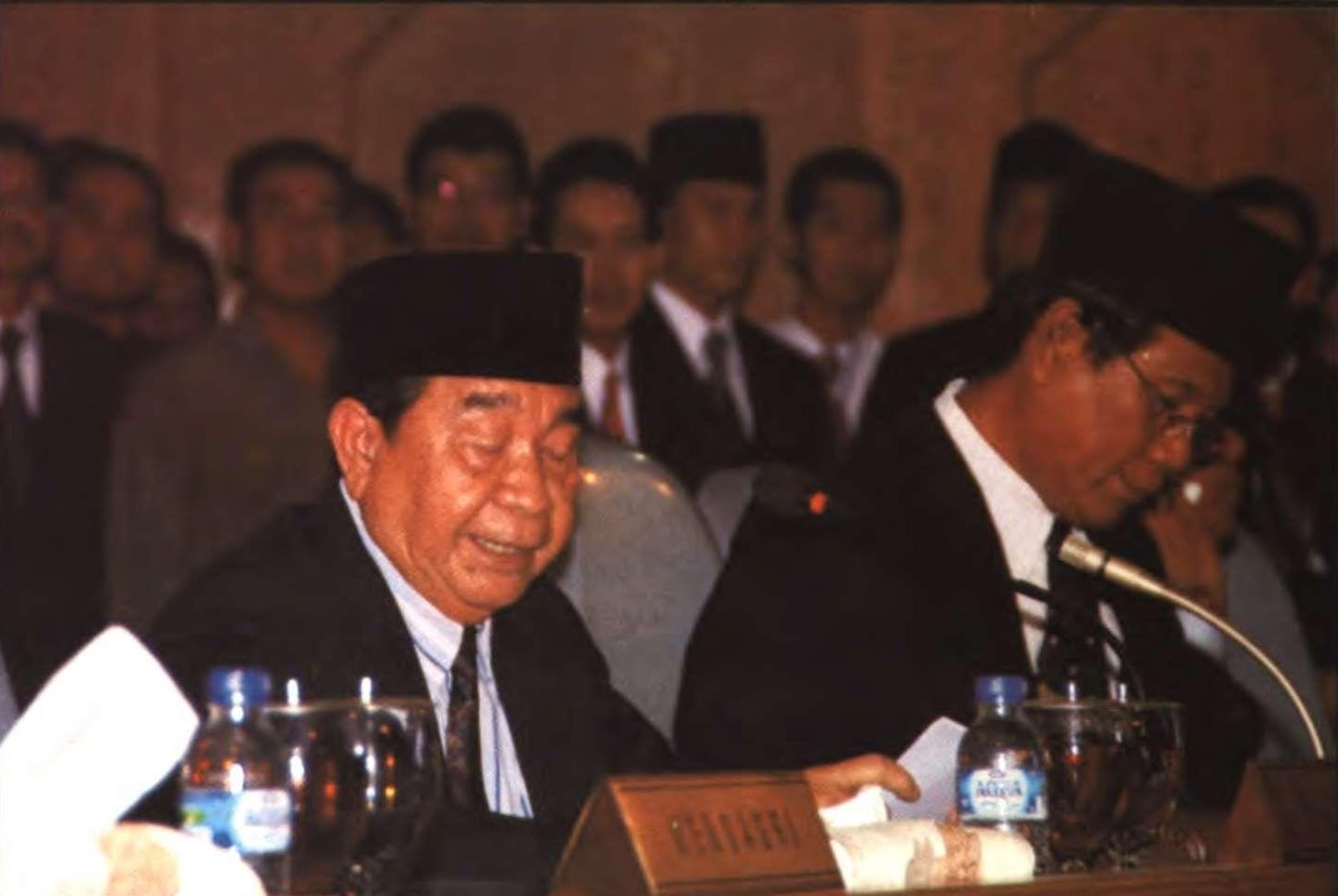
Abdul Wahab Dalimunthe chairing the special session of the North Sumatra Parliament.

Abdul was replaced by tycoon Rudolf Pardede as vice governor on 16 June 2003 and retired from the civil service shortly after. His position as Golkar's leader in North Sumatra propelled him to become the speaker of the North Sumatra parliament in 2004. However, in late 2007, the Reform Star Party and the Prosperous Justice Party announced their plans to nominate Abdul as a candidate in the 2008 gubernatorial elections without the endorsement of Golkar. Abdul accepted the nomination, and as a result, Abdul was removed from the party on 12 February 2008 and lost the speaker's seat on 27 November 2008. Nevertheless, Abdul ran in the gubernatorial election. He lost the elections to candidate Syamsul Arifin, but managed to place higher in comparison to the official Golkar candidate.

Abdul joined the Democratic Party after he was expelled from Golkar. He ran as a candidate for the People's Representative Council from the North Sumatra constituency and managed to obtain a seat. After his term ended, Abdul ran again for the same seat, but lost. However, on 6 April 2017, Abdul was called to replace Ruhut Sitompul.

Abdul started his third term as MP on 1 October 2019 after obtaining a seat in the 2019 Indonesian general election. Abdul's age made him the oldest serving member in the parliament, and automatically, the temporary speaker of the People's Representative Council. The temporary speakership was assumed for a few hours only, as on the night of 1 October 2019, Puan Maharani became the definitive speaker.

== Death ==
Abdul died at the Columbia Hospital in Medan at approximately 14:15 local time on 8 November 2021.
