= Tengku Erry Nuradi =

Indonesian politician

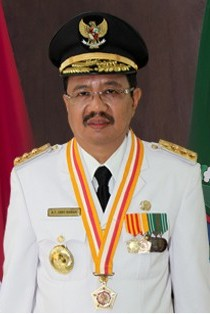

17th Governor of North Sumatra
- In office 25 May 2016 – 16 June 2018; Acting: 10 August 2015 – 25 May 2016
- President: Joko Widodo
- Deputy: Nurhajizah Marpaung
- Preceded by: Gatot Pujo Nugroho
- Succeeded by: Edy Rahmayadi

7th Vice Governor of North Sumatra
- In office 16 June 2013 – 25 May 2016; Acting: 11 August 2015 – 25 May 2016
- President: Susilo Bambang Yudhoyono; Joko Widodo
- Governor: Gatot Pujo Nugroho
- Preceded by: Gatot Pujo Nugroho
- Succeeded by: Nurhajizah Marpaung

1st Regent of Serdang Bedagai
- In office 8 August 2005 – 16 June 2013
- President: Susilo Bambang Yudhoyono
- Governor: Tengku Rizal Nurdin; Rudolf Pardede; Syamsul Arifin; Gatot Pujo Nugroho
- Deputy: Soekirman
- Preceded by: Chairullah (Acting)
- Succeeded by: Soekirman

Personal details
- Born: Tengku Erry Nuradi; June 30, 1964 (age 62) Medan, North Sumatra, Indonesia
- Citizenship: Indonesian
- Party: Perindo Party
- Spouse: Evi Diana br. Sitorus
- Relations: Tengku Rizal Nurdin (Brother)
- Children: Tengku Muhammad R. Riadhi; Vira Annisa; Tengku Muhammad Ryan Novandi
- Education: University of North Sumatra

Tengku Erry Nuradi is an Indonesian politician who was the governor of North Sumatra. He replaced his predecessor, Gatot Pujo Nugroho, after the latter's conviction for graft by the Corruption Eradication Commission.

In the 2024 Indonesian legislative election, he unsuccessfully ran for a seat at the House of Representatives as a Perindo Party candidate.
