= Nurhajizah Marpaung =

Indonesian military officer and politician (born 1956)

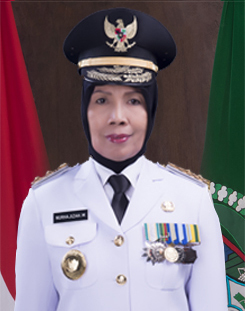

8th Vice Governor of North Sumatra
- In office 9 March 2017 – 16 June 2018
- President: Joko Widodo
- Governor: Tengku Erry Nuradi
- Preceded by: Tengku Erry Nuradi
- Succeeded by: Musa Rajekshah

General Counsel of the Ministry of Defense
- In office July 2011 – 15 July 2014
- Preceded by: A. Afandi
- Succeeded by: Bambang

Personal details
- Born: 7 August 1956 (age 70) Bandar Pulau, Asahan, North Sumatra, Indonesia
- Party: NasDem Party (2018–present)
- Other political affiliations: Hanura (2015–2018)
- Spouse: Tunas Dwidharto
- Education: University of North Sumatra

Military service
- Allegiance: Indonesia
- Branch/service: Indonesian Army
- Years of service: 1985–2014
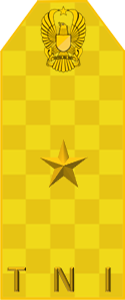
- Rank: Brigadier General TNI
- Unit: Legal Corps

Nurhajizah Marpaung (born 7 August 1956) is an Indonesian retired military officer and politician who became the Vice Governor of North Sumatra from 2017 until 2018. Her last position in the military was as the General Counsel of the Ministry of Defense. She unsuccessfully ran for Regent of Asahan in 2015 and 2020.

== Early life ==
Nurhajizah was born on 7 August 1956 in Bandar Pulau, Asahan, as the daughter of Jahya Marpaung. She attended elementary school in Aek Song-Songan from 1962 until 1968, junior high school in Pulau Raja from 1968 until 1971, and high school in Kisaran from 1971 until 1974. She then continued her university education at the University of North Sumatra. During her time in the university, she joined the Muslim Students' Association. She graduated from the university in 1983 with a bachelor's degree in law.

== Military career ==
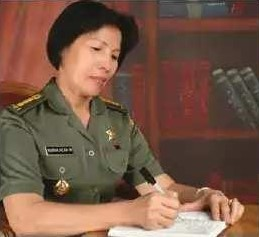
Nurhajizah Marpaung as a colonel in 2007

After she graduated from university, she enrolled at the officer's conscription school in 1984 and graduated from there the same year. From there, she held various position in the military court, supreme court, and at the armed forces' legal development body. One of the notable cases that she handled was the Tanjung Priok massacre trial in October 2003, where she and two other military justice officer became the legal representative for Rudolf Adolf Butar Butar, former commander of the North Jakarta military district, who was accused of violating human rights during the incident. Butar Butar was convicted and sentenced to 10 years in 2004. She became the acting Head of the Legal Assistance and Advice Bureau of the armed forces in 2004 before becoming the definitive officeholder of the position in 2005.

Nurhajizah was transferred to the Ministry of Defense in 2010 and held several lower-echelon offices. A year later, she was appointed as the general counsel of the Ministry of Defense on 28 June 2011, replacing A. Affandi who retired earlier that month. Following her appointment, she was promoted to brigadier general on 17 August 2011, making her the sixth female to become a general in the Indonesian Army. She was relieved from her position on 15 July 2014 and retired from the military on the same year. The position was left vacant for several months until a new officeholder was installed in December 2014.

== Political career ==
Following her retirement, she joined the ASABRI company, a government-owned enterprise which provided insurance and pension funds for active and retired armed forces members. She became the director for human resources and general affairs in the company. She left the company in 2015 to run for the 2015 Asahan regent election.

=== 2015 Asahan regent election ===
Nurhajizah registered as a candidate for the 2015 Asahan regent election on 3 August 2015, in which she picked Amir Syarifuddin as his running mate. Her candidacy was approved by the General Elections Commission on 24 August and was assigned the ballot number 1 by the commission the next day. She received support from the Great Indonesia Movement Party and the People's Conscience Party.

Nurhajizah was defeated in the election by incumbent Taufan Gama Simatupang. She only obtained 122,247 votes (43.7% of the votes) while the incumbent obtained 157,558 votes (56.3% of the votes). Similar to other retired military officer competing in that year local elections, analysts credited her defeat to the lack of her prominence in the region.

=== Vice Governor of North Sumatra ===
==== Election ====
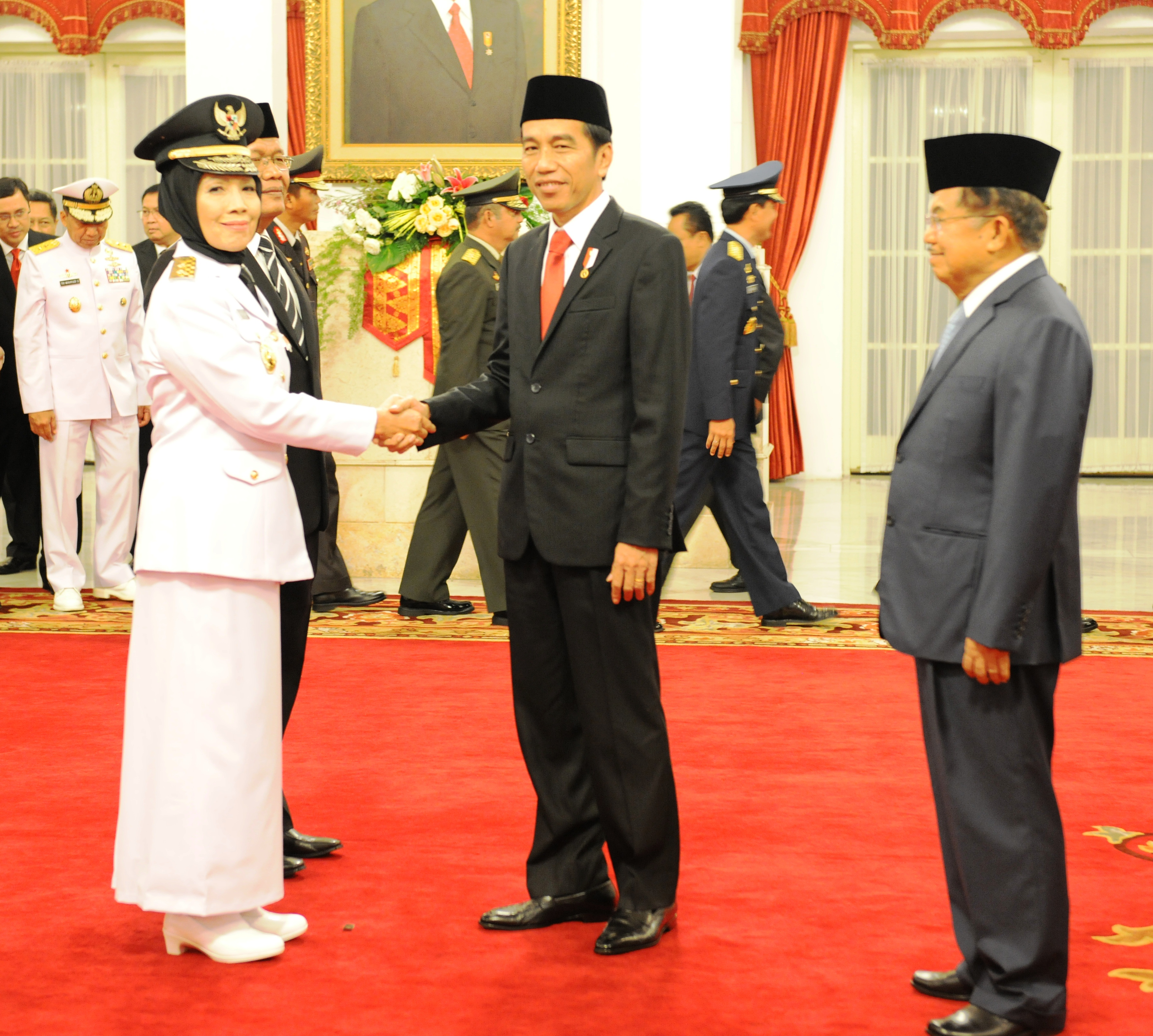
Nurhajizah shaking hands with Joko Widodo after her inauguration as the vice governor of North Sumatra

On 3 August 2015, Governor of North Sumatra Gatot Pujo Nugroho and her wife were arrested due to corruption. His deputy, Tengku Erry Nuradi, was appointed as the acting governor a week later. Erry status was upgraded from acting governor to the definitive governor on 25 May 2016. An internal parliamentary election was then held to elect a new vice governor.

Nurhajizah was nominated for the vice governor's office by Hanura, the main supporting party of Erry Nuradi. Her nomination was shocking as he was not well known in North Sumatra. The opposition party in the province's council, the Prosperous Justice Party, nominated Muhammad Idris Luthfi Rambe as the candidate. At the election held on 24 October 2016, Nurhajizah won with 68 votes out of 87 valid votes from the members of the parliament. She was installed as vice governor on 9 May 2017. She became the first female ever to serve as the vice governor of North Sumatra as well as the fourth female in Indonesia to serve as vice governor.

The gubernatorial election process was disputed by the chairman of the North Sumatra Ulema National Awakening Party, Muhammad Ikhyar Velayati Harahap. The Jakarta Civil Service Arbitration Court ruled in favor of Muhammad. The court demanded the cancellation of the presidential decree that officially made Nurhajizah as the vice governor and to held another internal parliamentary election with the participation of non-parliamentary parties. However, no further actions were taken by the government.

==== Survey ====
A survey conducted by Indo Barometer in February 2018 found out that only 9.8% of the respondents were satisfied with Nurhajizah's performance as the vice governor of North Sumatra, while 34.2% were dissatisfied. Only 8.9% of respondents wanted her to become the next Governor of North Sumatra, while 49.5% were unwilling.

The same survey conducted at the end of her term in June 2018 showed that the number of satisfaction has increased from 12.4%, while the number of dissatisfaction also increased to 67.5%. The number of respondents that wanted her to become the next governor of North Sumatra decreased to 4.4%, while the number of those who were unwilling increased to 76.5%.

=== 2019 Indonesian general election ===
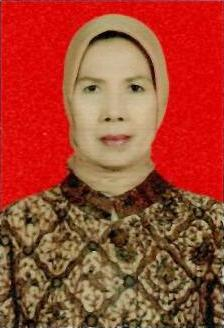
Nurhajizah Marpaung as a candidate for the member of the People's Representative Council in 2019

After Nurhajizah's and Erry's term as vice governor and governor ended, both registered themselves as a candidate for the People's Representative Council in the 2019 Indonesian general election. Nurhajizah herself moved from the People's Conscience Party to the NasDem Party during the parliamentary candidate registration in July 2018. Nurhajizah was registered as a candidate from the North Sumatera 3 constituency, covering Asahan, Simalungun, Dairi, Karo, Langkat, Pakpak Bharat, Batubara, Tanjungbalai, Pematangsiantar, and Binjai. Although her party managed to obtain a seat from the constituency, Nurhajizah did not obtain enough vote for a seat.

=== 2020 Asahan regent election ===
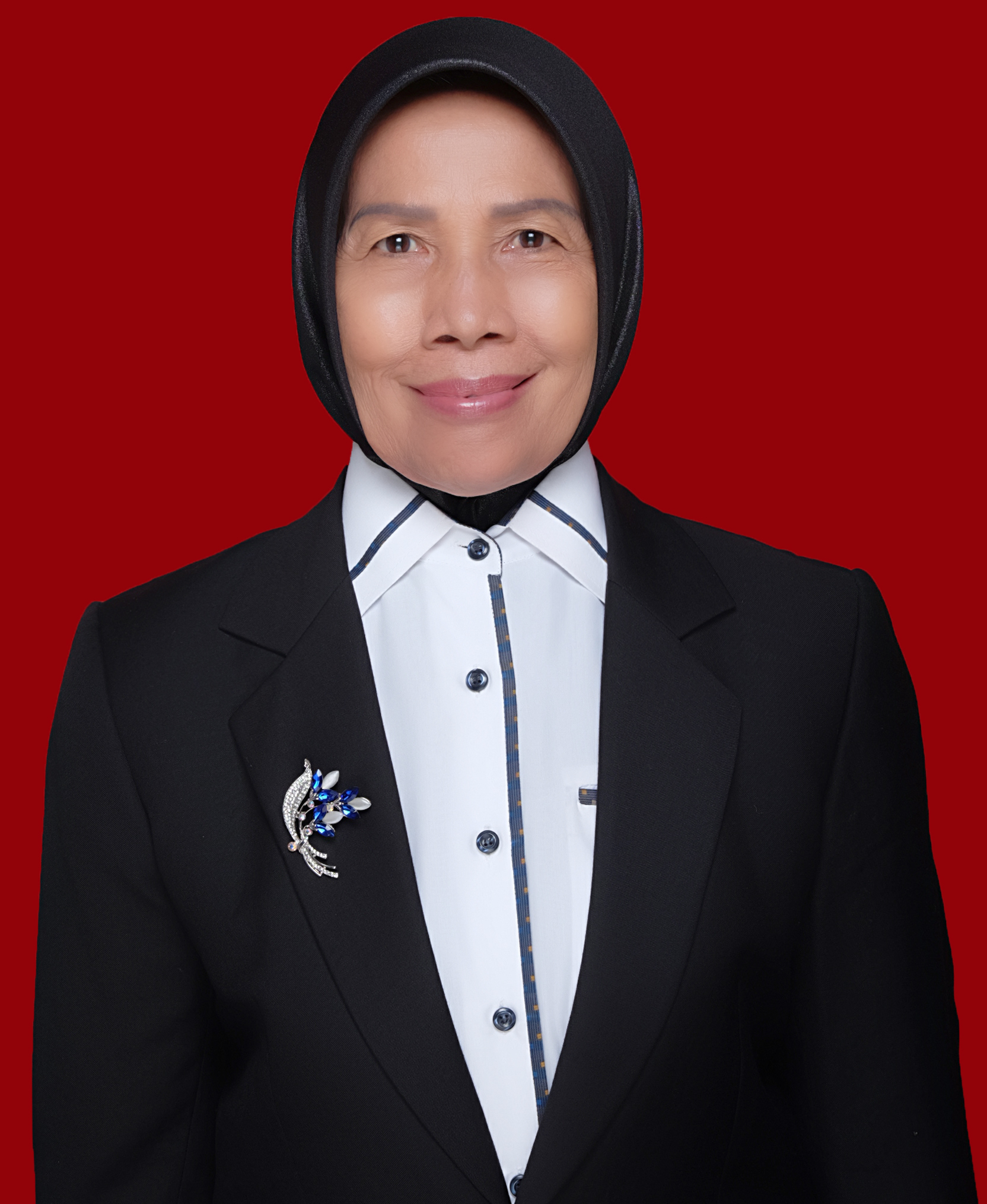
Nurhajizah Marpaung as a candidate for the Regent of Asahan in 2020

Nurhajizah attempted to run again in the Asahan regent election after her defeat in the previous election. Nurhajizah picked Henri Siregar, a member of the Asahan parliament from the Prosperous Justice Party, as her running mate. The pair received support from their original party, the Prosperous Justice Party and Nasdem Party, as well as other parliamentary party such as the National Awakening Party and the Great Indonesia Movement Party. She and Henri registered to the General Elections Commission on 4 September 2020 and their candidacy was declared valid and eligible by the commission twenty days later. The pair were assigned ballot number one.

Nurhajizah lost again in the election to the incumbent. She obtained 101,124 votes (32.82% of the total votes), as opposed to the incumbent who obtained 139,005 votes (45.11% of the total votes). However, Nurhajizah refused to concede and accused that the incumbent won the election by bribing voters and instructed bureaucrats in the regions to vote for the incumbent. Nurhajizah brought the accusations to the constitutional court but was rejected due to lack of legal standing.

== Family ==
Nurhajizah is married to Tunas Dwidharto. The couple has a daughter named Kartika Rahmadayanti.

== Awards ==
- Military Long Service Medals, 4th Category (Indonesian: Satyalancana Kesetiaan 8 Tahun) (1993)
- Military Long Service Medals, 3rd Category (Indonesian: Satyalancana Kesetiaan 16 Tahun) (2004)
- Military Long Service Medals, 2nd Category (Indonesian: Satyalancana Kesetiaan 24 Tahun) (2009)
- Star of Kartika Eka Paksi, 3rd Class (Indonesian: Bintang Kartika Eka Paksi Nararya) (2011)
- Star of Yudha Dharma, 3rd Class (Indonesian: Bintang Yudha Dharma Nararya) (13 May 2013)
