= Rudolf Pardede =

Indonesian businessman and politician (1942–2023)

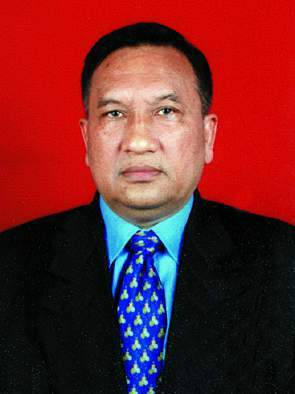
- Official portrait, 1999

14th Governor of North Sumatra
- In office 5 September 2005^{[a]} – 16 June 2008
- President: Susilo Bambang Yudhoyono
- Preceded by: Tengku Rizal Nurdin
- Succeeded by: Syamsul Arifin

Vice Governor of North Sumatra
- In office 16 June 2003 – 5 September 2005
- Governor: Tengku Rizal Nurdin
- Preceded by: Abdul Wahab Dalimunthe; Lundu Panjaitan
- Succeeded by: Gatot Pujo Nugroho

Member of the Regional Representative Council
- In office 1 October 2009 – 1 October 2014
- Constituency: North Sumatra

Member of the People's Consultative Assembly
- Regional Delegate
- In office 1 October 1999 – 16 June 2003
- Constituency: North Sumatra

Member of the People's Representative Council
- In office 1 October 1992 – 1 October 1997
- Constituency: North Sumatra

Personal details
- Born: 4 April 1942 Balige, Japanese-occupied Dutch East Indies
- Died: 27 June 2023 (aged 81) Medan, North Sumatra, Indonesia
- Party: Gerindra
- Other political affiliations: PDI (1982–1999); PDI-P (1999–2009)
- Spouse: Vera Natarida br. Tambunan
- Children: 4
- Parents: Tumpal Dorianus Pardede (father); Hermina br. Napitupulu (mother)
- Education: Kinki University
- Website: Official website
- a. Acting until 10 March 2006

Rudolf Matzuoka Pardede (4 April 1942 – 27 June 2023) was an Indonesian businessman and politician. He was the 14th governor of North Sumatra from 2005 until 2008. He previously was the deputy of Governor Tengku Rizal Nurdin and replaced Nurdin after his death in a plane crash.

== Early life ==
Pardede was born on 4 April 1942 in Balige, North Sumatra, as the third child of Tumpal Dorianus Pardede, an entrepreneur and a former minister in President Sukarno's last cabinet, and his wife Hermina br. Napitupulu. Pardede grew up with six sisters: Sariaty, Emmy, Anny, Mery, Reny, Indriany and two brothers: Hisar and Johnny.

Due to his father's work, Pardede and his family had to move from city to city. Upon completing his primary education at the Nasrani Elementary School in Medan in 1954, Pardede moved to Tanjungpinang in Riau. He attended the 1st Tanjungpinang State Junior High School and graduated in 1959. His parents then enrolled him at the Penabur Christian High School in Sukabumi, West Java. He was sent to Japan to study economics at the Kinki University after finishing high school in 1962. He graduated from the university in 1966.

== Business and organization career ==
Shortly after returning from Japan, Pardede was entrusted by his father to manage his businesses. Pardede headed several family companies, such as the TD Pardede Holding Company, TD Pardede Textile Company, Berkat Kasih Karunia Company, Balai Hermina, and the Danau Toba Hotel International, which hosted North Sumatra's first bowling alley. The presence of the bowling alley helped developed the sport in the province and led to North Sumatra's first gold medal in bowling at the 1980 National Sports Week.

Pardede was also involved in football administration and became the general manager of Pardedetex F.C. The club assembled together Indonesia football stars such as Sucipto, Jakop Sihasale, Iswadi Idris, Kadir, and Yuswardi. The football club went on an Asian tour in 1970 and managed to win several matches both abroad and domestically.

Aside from involvement in business and football, Pardede was active in various social and professional organizations. In 1969, Pardede was elected as the chairman of Association of Young Entrepreneurs of North Sumatra. He later became the chairman of Karateka Kushin Ryu-M Karatedo (KKI) of North Sumatra, North Sumatra Environmental Society, as well as the chief advisor to the KAMPAK Fan Club (one of the two main fan clubs of PSMS Medan), Union of Rickshaw Drivers, and the Union of North Sumatran Lawyers.

Pardede established the Perjuangan daily in 1998 and became its chief editor until 1999.

== Political career ==
Pardede joined the Indonesian Democratic Party (PDI) in 1982. In the 1992 Indonesian legislative election, Pardede was elected to the People's Representative Council from the PDI list, representing North Sumatra. Pardede was seated in Commission VII, which handles finance, trade, and logistics.

After the fall of Suharto, members of PDI who supported Megawati Sukarnoputri—including Pardede—broke away and formed the Indonesian Democratic Party of Struggle (PDIP). PDIP won the 1999 Indonesian legislative election in North Sumatra. The North Sumatra Regional People's Representative Council, being dominated by PDIP, sent Pardede as one of the regional delegates to the People's Consultative Assembly. Pardede was then elected as the chairman of North Sumatra's PDIP a year after he became regional delegate.

=== Vice Governor of North Sumatra ===
In 2003, Pardede became the running mate of Tengku Rizal Nurdin, who was seeking to be re-elected as the Governor of North Sumatra. Pardede's nomination was obstructed by the absence of his diploma, which was declared missing on 3 March 2003. All Pardede's diplomas, with the exception of his high school diploma, were replaced by a confirmation letter from the respective institution. A confirmation letter for the replacement of his high school diploma was never made, as there were no proof that a diploma was issued. Despite this, Pardede was still allowed to compete in the election.

The election was held in two rounds on 26 May 2003. In the first round, the pair obtained 39 out of 85 votes from the North Sumatra Regional People's Representative Council. Due to a lack of majority, the election proceeded to the next round. Nurdin and Pardede won the election with 51 out of 85 votes. The pair was installed on 16 June 2003. On 18 July 2003, Pardede was named as a suspect for falsifying his high school diploma. However, no further action was taken by the police.

About two years after Pardede became vice governor, the 2005 Nias–Simeulue earthquake occurred. Pardede was dispatched by Nurdin to lead relief efforts by the provincial government in Nias. Pardede visited the Gunungsitoli Hospital in Nias capital to conduct dialogue with the earthquake victims and medical personnel and the Gomo district in Southern Nias to provide assistance for the locals.

=== Governor of North Sumatra ===
On 5 September 2005, Nurdin was on the Mandala Airlines Flight 091, which was on its way to Jakarta to meet Susilo Bambang Yudhoyono in Jakarta. The plane crashed midway, killing all of its passengers. As Nurdin's deputy, Pardede was named by the Minister of Home Affairs as the acting governor of North Sumatra on the same day. However, the Department of Home Affairs found out about his status as a suspect and re-considered the appointment of Pardede.

Pardede's status as a suspect in diploma forgery led to opposition from various groups. The chairman of the Prosperous Justice Party (PKS) and the Reform Star Party (PBR) in North Sumatra declared their opposition to Rudolf Pardede and demanded the provincial police and attorney general investigate the case. Later that year, around a thousand protesters from thirty-four different organizations rallied in front of the North Sumatra's Regional Representative Council office, demanding the resignation of Pardede for forging his high school diploma. The police finally investigated Pardede's case in February 2006 and reinstated his suspect status. The police handed over his case to the provincial general attorney, but was rejected due to incompleteness.

Despite the continued resistance, Pardede was installed as governor on 10 March 2006. His inauguration made him the first civilian governor of North Sumatra since Roos Telaumbanua in 1965. Protesters continued to demand his resignation, while PKS and PBR continued to voice their opposition to Pardede. Members of both parties in the parliament would walk out whenever Pardede was present in parliamentary meetings. Resistance against Pardede's administration grew larger as he implemented controversial policies, such as the increase of water bill, appointment of civil servants which violated the general guidelines, and the distribution of stationery to school by Pardede's wife based on religious and ethnic lines. The National Mandate Party and United Development Party later joined PKS and PBR as opposition due to these controversies.

=== Later political career ===
At the end of his term, Pardede sought to be reelected with support from PDIP. However, Pardede's diploma controversy discouraged PDIP from endorsing him, and the party supported former North Sumatra military commander Tritamtomo as their gubernatorial candidate. PDIP then ousted Pardede from his position as chairman of PDIP in North Sumatra. Pardede then switched allegiance from PDIP to Gerindra Party and became chief advisor to the North Sumatra's Gerindra Party.

After his failure to run as a governor, Pardede ran as a senator for North Sumatra in the 2009 Indonesian legislative election. He won the election by obtaining 609,539 votes, the highest amount of vote for a senator in North Sumatra. He attempted to run in the 2010 Medan mayoral election, but was obstructed by his diploma controversy. Pardede attempted a second term as senator in 2014, but failed to obtain enough votes.

== Personal life ==
=== Family ===
Pardede was married to Vera Natari br. Tambunan and had four children. His oldest child, Yohana Pardede, became the chairman of Gerindra in the 2010s, but died under mysterious circumstances in September 2013. His third child, Salomo Pardede, was elected as a member of North Sumatra Regional People's Representative Council and was arrested in 2020 for corruption charges.

=== Religion ===
Pardede and his family adhered to the Protestant faith. He was a member of the Indonesian Evangelical Church and chaired the church's social and development council.

=== Wealth ===
Pardede made his first public report on his wealth on 18 April 2001, while he was a member of the People's Consultative Assembly. According to the report, he had a net worth of IDR 298,740,200,000 (USD 29,114,567). His first public wealth report was announced in August 2001 and made him Indonesia's richest public official in that year.

Pardede made his second report as the governor of North Sumatra on 19 November 2007. His second report saw two-fold increase in wealth to IDR 625,684,200,000 (USD 68,448,113). His third and final report was announced on 15 March 2010 as a senator, which saw a slight decrease to IDR 506 billion (USD 55,662,913).

=== Death ===
Pardede died at the Siloam Hospital in Medan, on the night of 27 June 2023, at the age of 81. His body was laid at the TD Pardede Hall. Public officials, such as defense minister Prabowo Subianto, governor of North Sumatra Edy Rahmayadi, and mayor of Medan Bobby Nasution, paid their final respects to Pardede. A traditional Bataknese mourning ceremony would be held on 1 July before his funeral at the family cemetery in Deli Serdang.
