= List of vice governors of North Sumatra =

This article lists vice governors of North Sumatra who have assisted the governor of North Sumatra.

| No. | Photo | Vice Governor | Took office | Left office | Governor | R |
|---|---|---|---|---|---|---|
| 1 | | Raja Syahnan (1923–2013) | April 1960 | February 1965 | Raja Junjungan Lubis | |
| 1 | | Raja Syahnan (1923–2013) | April 1960 | February 1965 | Eny Karim | |
| 1 | | Raja Syahnan (1923–2013) | April 1960 | February 1965 | Ulung Sitepu | |
| 2 | | Alimuddin Simanjuntak (1931–2008) | 1991 | 31 May 1994 | Raja Inal Siregar | |
| 3 | | Pieter Sibarani (1938–2017) | 31 May 1994 | October 1999 | Raja Inal Siregar | |
| 4 | | Abdul Wahab Dalimunthe (1938–2021) | 4 November 1997 | 16 June 2003 | Tengku Rizal Nurdin | |
| 4 | | Lundu Panjaitan (1941–) | October 1999 | 16 June 2003 | Tengku Rizal Nurdin | |
| 5 | | Rudolf Pardede (1942–) | 16 June 2003 | 5 September 2005 | Tengku Rizal Nurdin | |
| 6 | | Gatot Pujo Nugroho (1962–) | 16 June 2008 | 21 March 2011 | Syamsul Arifin | |
| 7 | | Tengku Erry Nuradi (1964–) | 16 June 2013 | 4 August 2015 | Gatot Pujo Nugroho | |
| 8 | | Nurhajizah Marpaung (1956–) | 9 March 2017 | 16 June 2018 | Tengku Erry Nuradi | |
| 9 | | Musa Rajekshah (1976–) | 5 September 2018 | Incumbent | Edy Rahmayadi | |
