= Alimuddin Simanjuntak =

Indonesia bureaucrat and Vice Governor of North Sumatra from 1988-1994

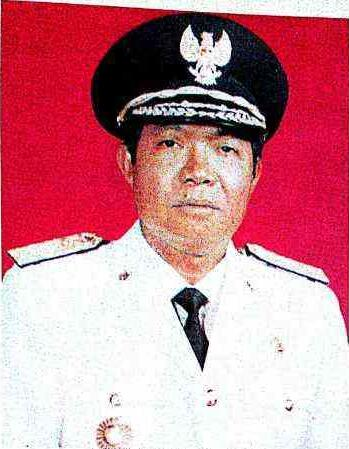

2nd Vice Governor of North Sumatra
- In office 29 February 1988 – 31 May 1994
- President: Suharto
- Governor: Raja Inal Siregar
- Preceded by: Raja Syahnan
- Succeeded by: Pieter Sibarani

Personal details
- Born: March 26, 1931 Balige, Bataklanden, Sumatra, Dutch East Indies
- Died: 2008
- Party: Golkar
- Spouse: Lucie Mukmin Ilahoede

Alimuddin Simanjuntak (26 March 1931 – 2008) was an Indonesia bureaucrat who became the Vice Governor of North Sumatra from 1988 until 1994.

Alimuddin was born on 26 March 1931 in Balige. He was married to Lucie Mukmin Ilahoede and had five children.

Alimuddin was appointed as the provincial secretary of North Sumatra, the most senior civil servant position in the province, under Governor Kaharuddin Nasution. After Kaharuddin was replaced by Raja Inal Siregar, Alimuddin was promoted to the newly established post of vice governor. He was installed on 29 February 1988 and served until his replacement by Pieter Sibarani on 31 May 1994.
