= Marpaung =

Batak surname originating in Indonesia

Marpaung is one of Toba Batak clans originating in North Sumatra, Indonesia. People of this clan bear the clan's name as their surname. Notable people of this clan include:

- Novita Dewi Marpaung (born 1978), Indonesian singer
- Nurhajizah Marpaung (born 1956), Indonesian military officer and politician
