= List of temporary speakers and deputy speakers of the People's Representative Council =

Temporary Speaker and Deputy Speaker of People's Representative Council
- Ketua dan Wakil Ketua Sementara Dewan Perwakilan Rakyat

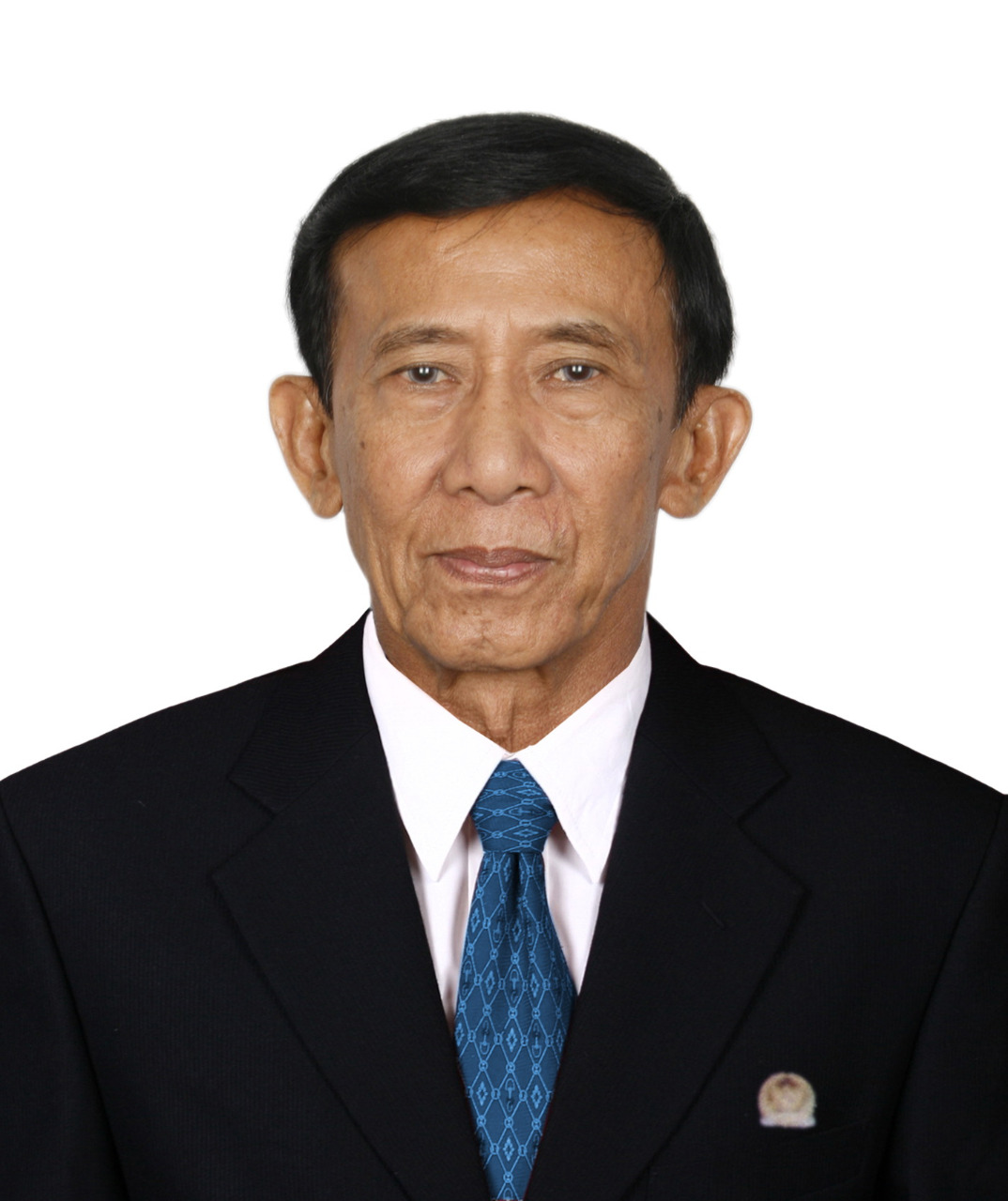
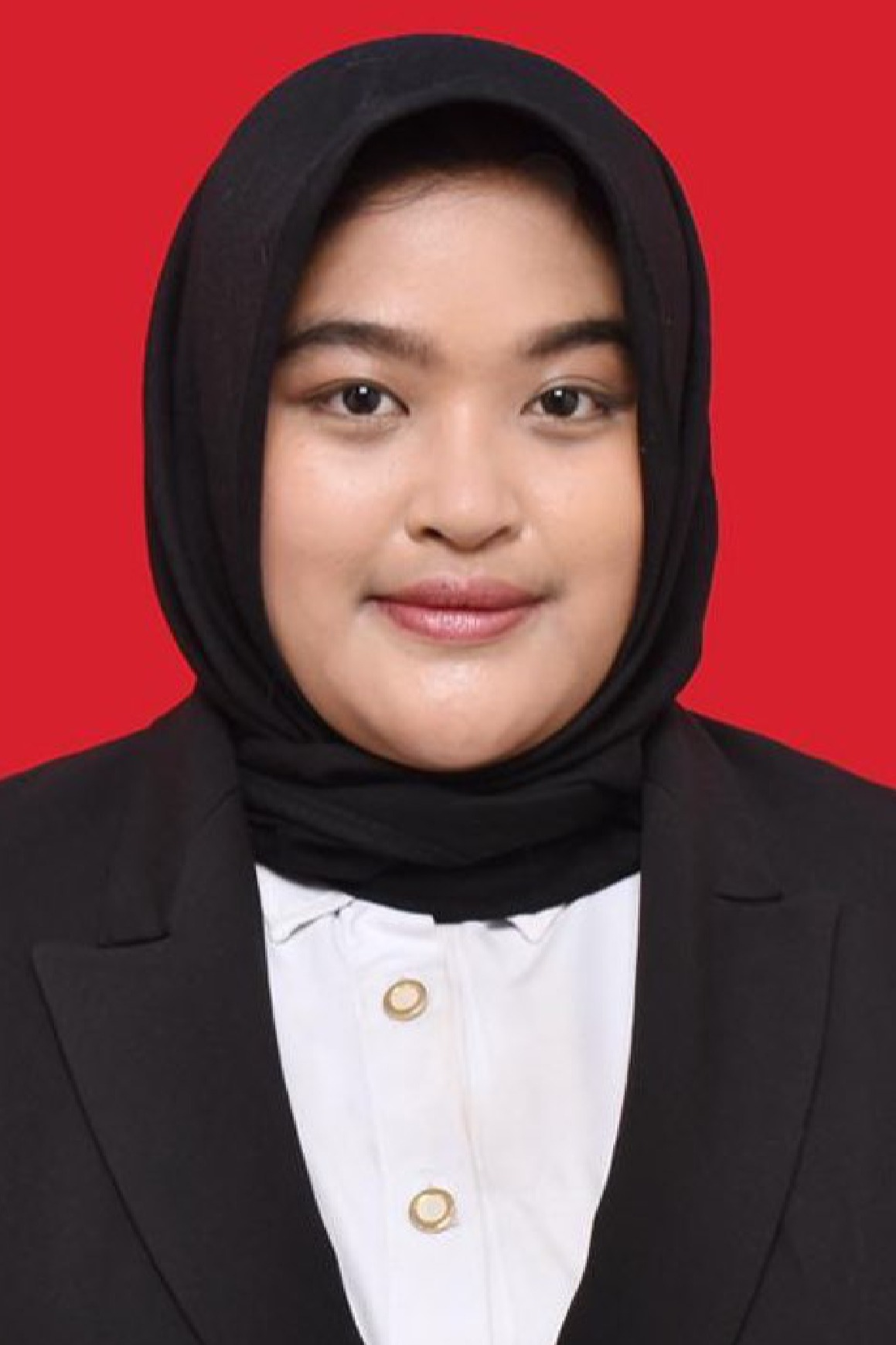
- Most recent officeholder Guntur Sasono (Temporary Speaker); Annisa Mahesa (Temporary Deputy Speaker); 1 October 2024
- Member of: People's Representative Council
- Inaugural holder: Sonda Daeng Mattajang
- Formation: 22 February 1950; 76 years ago

This article lists temporary speakers and deputy speakers who lead the meeting of Indonesia's People's Representative Council of the term before the definitive speaker and deputy speaker for the term is elected.

According to the tradition, since 1971, the position of temporary speakers is held by the youngest and oldest member of the council. Prior to 1971, the position is held by the oldest member only.

This tradition was halted for some time from 2004 until 2014, when a new law states that "the temporary speakers should be chosen from the party who obtained the largest and the second largest of the vote".

Term	Meetings	Temporary Speaker Oldest (1950-2004; 2014-now) Majority (2004-2014)				Temporary Deputy Speaker Youngest (1971-2004; 2014-now) 2nd Majority (2004-2014)				Notes
Term	Meetings	Photo	Name	Age	Party	Photo	Name	Age	Party	
1	22-23 February 1950		Sonda Daeng Mattajang	62 years, 2 months	East Indonesia	none				
2	19-21 August 1950		Radjiman Wediodiningrat	71 years, 3 months	Independent	none				
3	26 March 1956		Soedjono Prawirosoedardjo	80 years, 11 months	Individual	none				
4	none	none				none				
5	none	none				none				
6	none	none				none				
7	none	none				none				
8	28-29 October 1971		Bisri Syansuri	85 years, 1 month	PPP		Anak Agung Oka Mahendra	25 years, 4 months	Golkar	
9	1-4 October 1977		Sjafei Wirakusumah	77 years, 8 months	PPP		Sri Redjeki	26 years, 11 months	Golkar	
10	1-3 October 1982		Sjafei Wirakusumah	82 years, 8 months	PPP		Isyana Sadjarwo	28 years	Golkar	
11	1-3 October 1987		Ahmad Mursyidi	71 years, 10 months	PPP		Hussein Naro	24 years, 11 months	PPP	
12	1 October 1992		Usman Abdullah	75 years, 2 months	PPP		Dewi Paramatasari Yunus	23 years, 3 months	Golkar	
13	1 October 1997		Arsyad Pana	71	PPP		Liliek Herawati	27 years, 3 months	Golkar	
14	1 October 1999		Abdul Madjid	81 years, 10 months	PDI-P		Izzul Islam	29 years, 10 months	PPP	
15	1 October 2004		Agung Laksono	55 years, 6 months	Golkar		Jacobus Mayong Padang	49 years	PDI-P	
16	1 October 2009		Marzuki Alie	53 years, 10 months	Democratic		Priyo Budi Santoso	43 years, 6 months	Golkar	
17	1 October 2014		Popong Otje Djundjunan	75 years, 9 months	Golkar		Ade Rezki Pratama	25 years, 10 months	Gerindra	
18	1 October 2019		Abdul Wahab Dalimunthe	80 years, 8 months	Democratic		Hillary Brigitta Lasut	23 years, 4 months	Nasdem	
19	1 October 2024		Guntur Sasono	78 years, 2 months	Democratic		Annisa M.A. Mahesa	23 years, 2 months	Gerindra	

== Bibliography ==
- Tim Penyusun Sejarah (1970), Seperempat Abad Dewan Perwakilan Rakyat Republik Indonesia [A Quarter Century of the People's Representative Council of the Republic of Indonesia] (PDF) (in Indonesian), Jakarta: Sekretariat DPR-GR
