= Musa Rajekshah =

Indonesian entrepreneur and politician

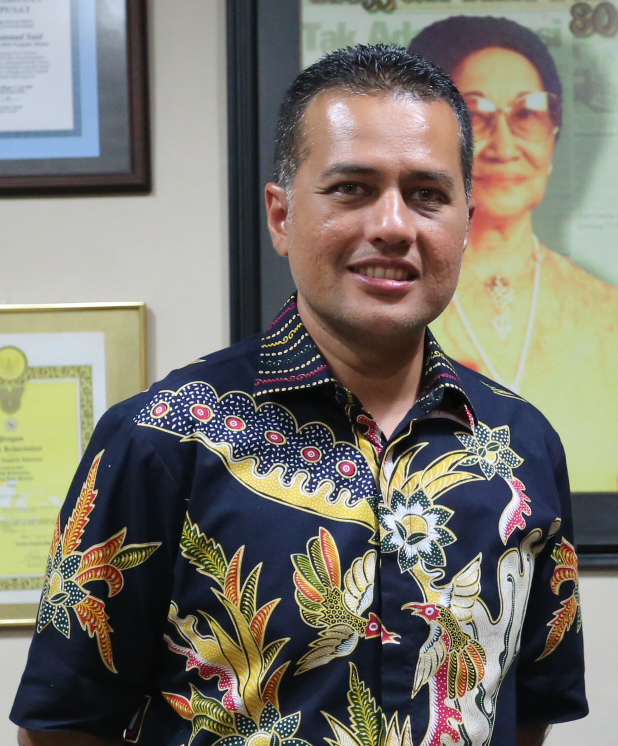

9th Vice Governor of North Sumatra
- In office 5 September 2018 – 5 September 2023
- President: Joko Widodo
- Governor: Edy Rahmayadi
- Preceded by: Nurhajizah Marpaung
- Succeeded by: Surya

Personal details
- Born: 1 April 1974 (age 52) Medan, North Sumatra, Indonesia
- Party: Golkar
- Spouse: Sri Ayu Mihari
- Parents: Anif (father); Syarifah Rahmah (mother)
- Education: Islamic University of North Sumatra; University of North Sumatra

Musa Rajekshah (born 1 April 1974), also known as Ijeck, is an Indonesian entrepreneur and politician from the Golkar party who became the Vice Governor of North Sumatra since 5 September 2018.
