= Ruhut Sitompul =

Indonesian actor and politician

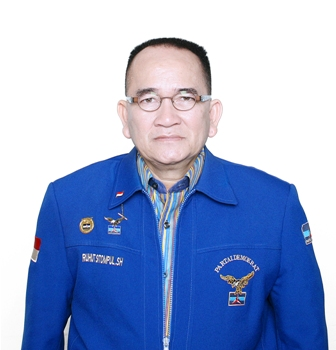

Member of People's Representative Council
- In office 1 October 2009 – 6 April 2017
- Succeeded by: Abdul Wahab Dalimunthe
- Constituency: North Sumatra III (2009–2014); North Sumatra I (2014–2017)

Personal details
- Born: 24 March 1954 (age 72) Medan, North Sumatra, Indonesia
- Party: PDI-P (since 2017)
- Other political affiliations: Golkar (1983–2004); Democratic (2004–2017)
- Spouse: Anna Rudhiantiana Legawati (m.1998)
- Parent(s): Humala Sitompul (father); Surtani Panggabean (mother)
- Education: Padjadjaran University
- Occupation: Politician; advocate; actor

Ruhut Poltak Hotparulian Sitompul (born 24 March 1954) is an Indonesian lawyer, politician and actor. He was elected twice into the People's Representative Council, in 2009 and 2014. As a lawyer, he handled many cases of high-profile politicians, and maintained a high-profile status in media himself, having gained popularity through his acting role in television.

== Early life and family ==
Sitompul was born in Medan, North Sumatra on 24 March 1954 and studied at Padjadjaran University. He is the second child of Humala Sitompul and Surtani Panggabean. According to Sitompul, he spent thirteen years of his childhood in Banda Aceh, as his father who served in the Indonesian National Armed Forces was assigned there. He is of Batak descent, and is a Protestant Christian.

Sitompul has married twice, with a son from his first marriage with Anna Rudhiantiana Legawati. His second marriage – which resulted in two other children – stirred controversy, as his first wife claimed to have never been legally divorced. His intellectually disabled first son Christian Sitompul from his first marriage is an athlete, and won a gold medal in swimming during the 2011 Special Olympics World Summer Games.

== Career ==
Owning his own law firm Ruhut Sitompul Associates, Sitompul was one of Suharto's lawyers, and was also the lawyer for Golkar chairman Akbar Tandjung. He maintained a high profile as a lawyer, often appearing in television shows alongside other lawyers such as Hotman Paris Hutapea and Farhat Abbas.

He also became an actor in the telenovela Gerhana, playing "Poltak", an oil baron. He obtained the role as he was at the time a legal adviser to StarVision, Gerhana's production studio. Though he was initially slated to play Poltak for just several episodes, his role was extended due to popularity with the audience. Later, in 2011, he starred in the religious film Sajadah Ka'bah.

Sitompul was also a cadre of Pemuda Pancasila.

=== Politics ===
Sitompul participated in the 2004 legislative election, contesting a People's Representative Council (DPR) seat from West Java under Golkar, but failed to gain a seat. He had been a member of Golkar since 1983. He then left Golkar and joined the Democratic Party, successfully securing a seat in DPR from North Sumatra's 3rd district. His party appointed Sitompul to the chairman of DPR's third commission in 2013, but the move was blocked by other members of the commission such as Bambang Soesatyo and Sitompul eventually withdrew his bid for the position. He was reelected following the 2014 legislative election, from North Sumatra's 1st district.

In 2010, Sitompul proposed to allow the extension of presidential term limits permitting Susilo Bambang Yudhoyono (SBY) to run for a third term, remarking that there were no suitable candidates. The proposition was challenged and attacked by many, including from Constitutional Court Chief Justice Mahfud MD, and Ruhut later noted that SBY rejected the idea.

For the 2017 Jakarta gubernatorial election, Sitompul endorsed and campaigned for the Basuki Tjahaja Purnama – Djarot Saiful Hidayat pair in direct opposition with his party, which supported Agus Harimurti Yudhoyono. Due to this, he was fired from the Democratic Party's supervisory board and he declared his intent to leave the legislative body. He officially resigned from the People's Representative Council in 2017 and was replaced by Abdul Wahab Dalimunthe. Despite so, he remained a member of the Democratic Party.

Sitompul joined Joko Widodo's 2019 presidential campaign team and did not run for a legislative seat.
