= Gatot Pujo Nugroho =

Indonesian politician (born 1962)

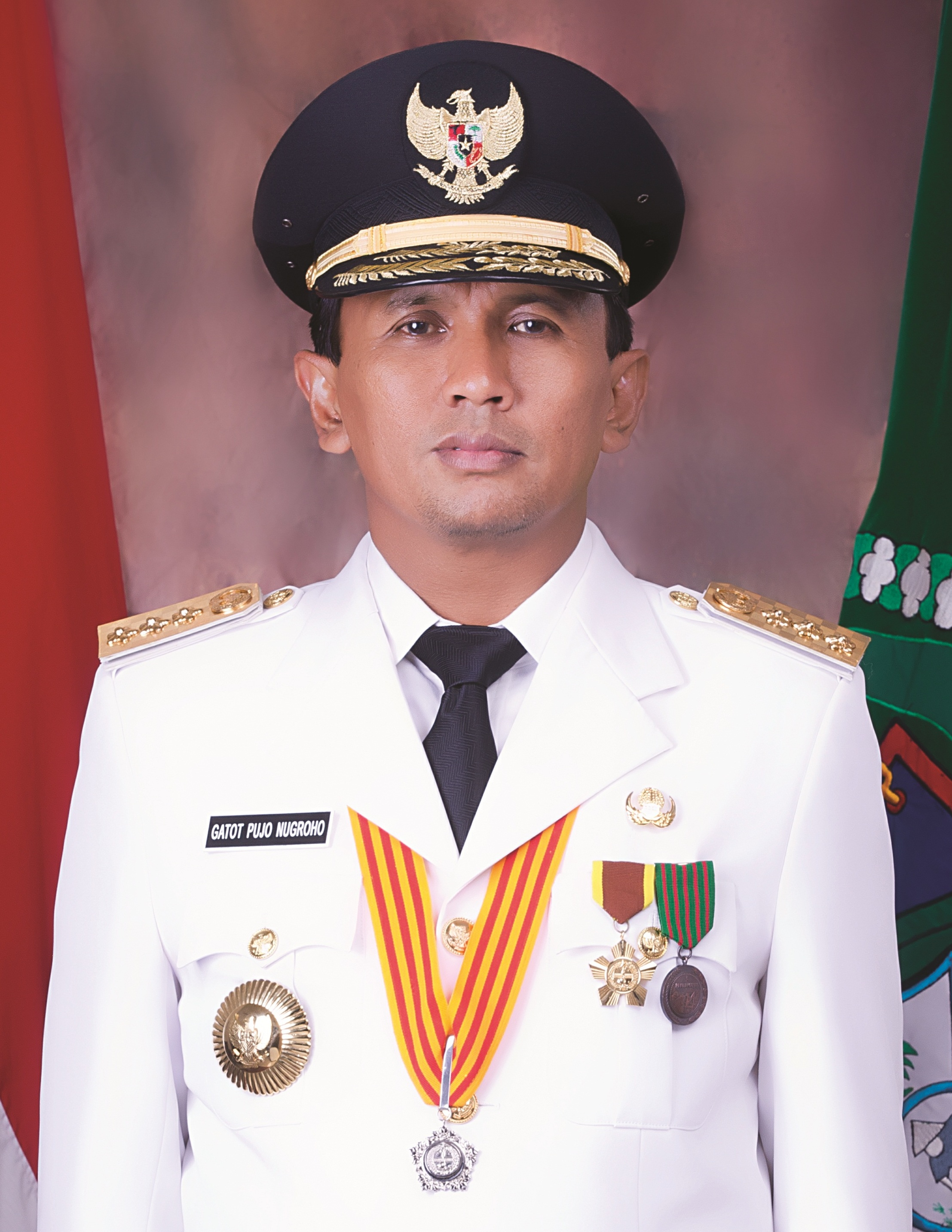
- Official portrait, 2013

Governor of North Sumatra
- In office 14 March 2013 – 4 August 2015
- President: Susilo Bambang Yudhoyono Joko Widodo
- Deputy: Tengku Erry Nuradi
- Preceded by: Syamsul Arifin
- Succeeded by: Tengku Erry Nuradi

Deputy Governor of North Sumatra
- In office 16 June 2008 – 21 March 2011
- President: Susilo Bambang Yudhoyono
- Governor: Syamsul Arifin
- Preceded by: Rudolf Pardede
- Succeeded by: Tengku Erry Nuradi

Personal details
- Born: 11 June 1962 (age 64) Mertoyudan, Magelang Regency, Central Java, Indonesia
- Party: Prosperous Justice Party
- Spouses: Sutias Handayani; Evy Susanti
- Children: 5
- Profession: Politician

Gatot Pujo Nugroho (born 11 June 1962) is a former Indonesian politician who was the Governor of North Sumatra from 2013 to 2015. He was arrested and convicted by the Indonesian Corruption Eradication Commission for involving bribes to members of the provincial legislature and misuse of social assistance and grant funds.

He was a member of the Prosperous Justice Party (PKS) and had previously served as the Deputy Governor and Acting Governor of North Sumatra.

== Background ==
Gatot was born in Magelang, Central Java, on 11 June 1962. His father Juli Tjokro Wardoyo was a retired army officer with the rank of First Lieutenant. His mother Sulastri was a housewife who was known as the leader of women's prayer groups in her neighborhood. Gatot grew up in a military complex in Magelang. Besides being raised with high discipline typical of military families, Gatot and his siblings also grew up in a religious family. Both his parents, including his grandparents from both sides, were known as religious figures and role models in their respective communities.

The religious atmosphere made Gatot close and interested in Islam since he was a child. Since he was in elementary school, Gatot had been accustomed to performing his five daily prayers. Because of his closeness to Islamic matters, he was nicknamed "Kyai" by his playmates. The nickname "Kyai" was still often used by his friends until he attended vocational high school.

== Corruption case ==
On 4 August 2015, Gatot was arrested by the Corruption Eradication Commission (KPK) for allegedly giving bribes to members of the North Sumatra Regional Legislative Council (DPRD) in relation to the approval of the provincial budget and the rejection of an interpellation motion. He was also accused of misusing social assistance and grant funds from the provincial government in 2012 and 2013, causing a state loss of Rp 4.03 billion. Gatot was also involved in three other corruption cases handled by the Attorney General's Office (AGO), namely the procurement of medical equipment, land acquisition for a toll road project, and a bribery case involving a former judge.

On 24 November 2016, Gatot was sentenced to six years in prison and a fine of Rp 200 million by the Medan Corruption Court for his role in the social assistance and grant funds case. He was found guilty of violating Article 2 paragraph (1) or Article 18 of Law No. 31 of 1999 on Corruption Eradication as amended by Law No. 20 of 2001 in conjunction with Article 55 paragraph (1) of the Criminal Code. The court also ordered him to pay Rp 2.88 billion in restitution or face an additional four years in prison. The sentence was lower than the prosecutor's demand of eight years in prison and a fine of Rp 250 million.

As a result of Gatot's confession and cooperation with the KPK, more than 50 former members of the North Sumatra DPRD from two different periods were implicated and prosecuted for receiving bribes from him. They were convicted and sentenced to various prison terms ranging from four to six years.

== Personal life ==
Gatot is married to Hj. Sutias Handayani and Evy Susanti. He has five children from his two marriages. His first wife, Sutias, is the daughter of former North Sumatra Governor Rizal Nurdin who died in a plane crash in 2005. His second wife, Evy, is a former model and actress who starred in several films and soap operas. Gatot is known to be a devout Muslim and a follower of the Prosperous Justice Party (PKS), an Islamic-based political party in Indonesia.
