= Ade Rezki Pratama =

Indonesian politician (born 1988)

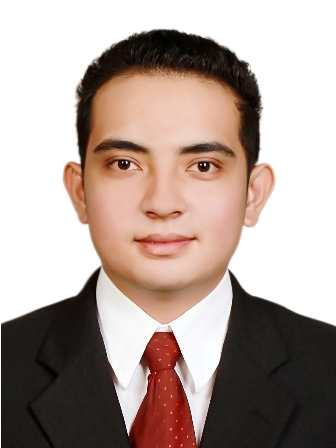
- Ade Rezki Pratama in 2013

Member of the House of Representatives
- Incumbent
- Assumed office 1 October 2014
- Constituency: West Sumatra II

Personal details
- Born: 8 November 1988 (age 37)
- Party: Gerindra Party
- Parent: Nelson Septiadi (father)
- Relatives: Irdinansyah Tarmizi (father-in-law)

Ade Rezki Pratama (born 8 November 1988) is an Indonesian politician serving as a member of the House of Representatives since 2014. He is the son of Nelson Septiadi and the son-in-law of Irdinansyah Tarmizi.
