= Syamsul Arifin =

Indonesian politician (1952–2023)

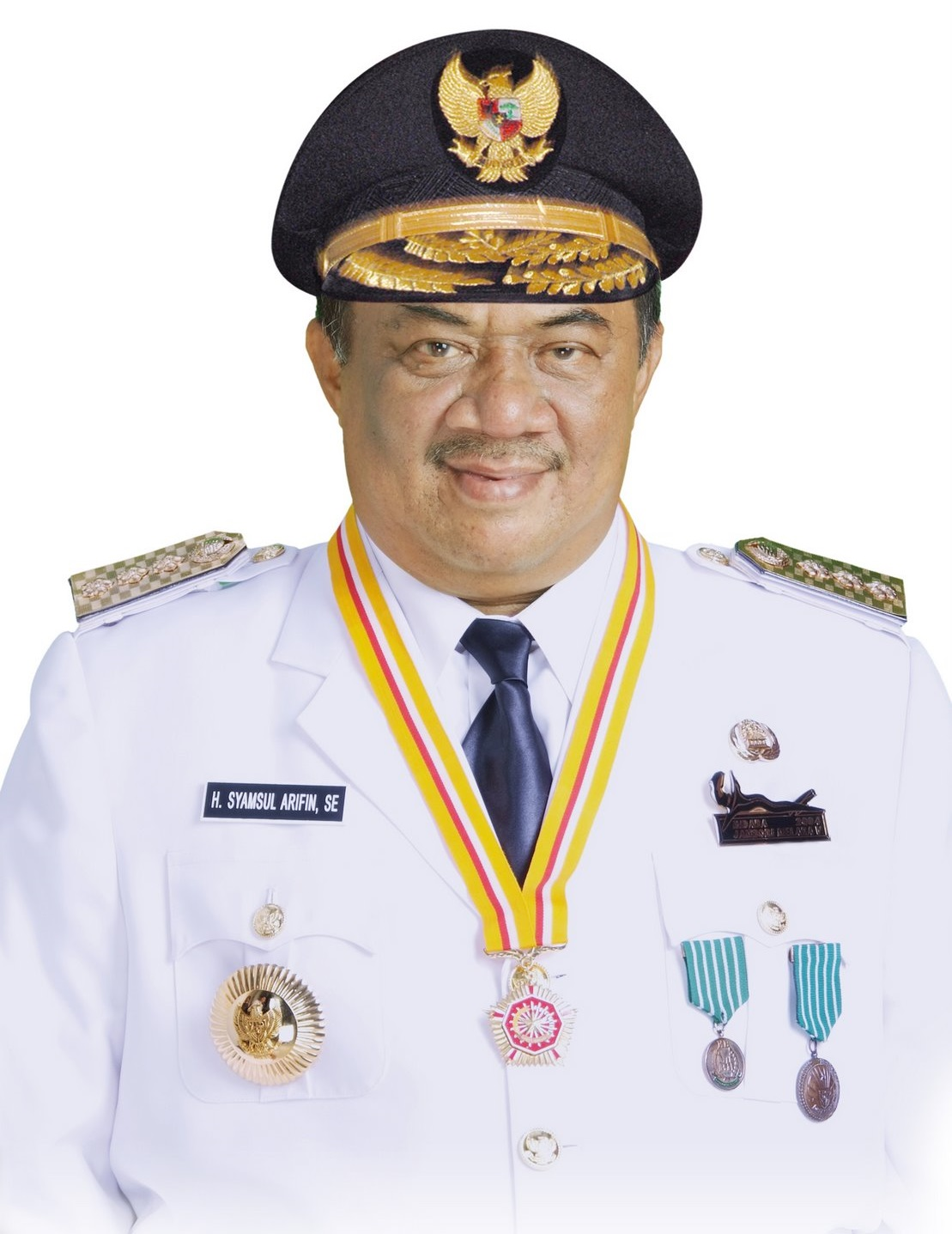
- Arifin in 2008

Governor of North Sumatra
- In office 16 June 2008 – 21 March 2011
- Governor: Tengku Rizal Nurdin; Rudolf Pardede
- Deputy: Yunus Saragih
- Preceded by: Rudolf Pardede
- Succeeded by: Gatot Pujo Nugroho

Regent of Langkat
- In office 20 February 1999 – 16 June 2008
- Preceded by: Abdul Wahab Dalimunthe
- Succeeded by: Yunus Saragih (acting); Ngogesa Sitepu

Acting Mayor of Medan
- In office 16 February 2010 – 25 July 2010
- Governor: himself
- Preceded by: Rahudman Harahap (acting)
- Succeeded by: Rahudman Harahap

Personal details
- Born: 22 September 1952 Medan, Indonesia
- Died: 17 October 2023 (aged 71) Jakarta, Indonesia
- Party: Golkar
- Spouse: Fatimah Habiebie (m. 1974)
- Children: 3
- Parents: Hasan Basri (father); Fadlah (mother)
- Education: Islamic University of North Sumatra

Syamsul Arifin (22 September 1952 – 17 October 2023) was an Indonesian politician. A member of Golkar, he served as Governor of North Sumatra from 2008 to 2011.

In the movie The Act of Killing we can see his friendship with the executioner Anwar Congo as well as Arifin praising the use of "preman", i.e gangsters, to rule Indonesia.

== Political career ==
He started his political career by joining the Golkar Party. He was appointed as a member of the Langkat Regency Regional People's Representative Council (DPRD) in the period 1977-1982 and 1982-1987. After gaining experience in the DPRD, Syamsul Arifin was then trusted to lead Langkat Regency as Regent for two periods, namely 1999-2004 and 2004-2008. During his tenure as Regent, he managed to achieve a number of achievements, such as the best village award at provincial level. Governor of North Sumatra: The peak of Syamsul Arifin's political career was when he was elected Governor of North Sumatra in the 2008-2012. He became the first governor of North Sumatra to be elected directly by the people, marking a new era of democracy in this province.

== Corruption ==
Syamsul has been officially dismissed from his position as Governor of North Sumatra by President Susilo Bambang Yudhoyono. With the issuance of this Presidential Decree, the Deputy Governor of North Sumatra, Gatot Pujo Nugroho, who is currently appointed as Acting Governor (Plt) will soon be appointed as governor. The remaining time on duty is not that long, because in March 2013 the North Sumatra gubernatorial election will be held, and according to the mid-2013 schedule the elected governor will be inaugurated. Syamsul was found guilty in the Langkat Regency Regional Revenue and Expenditure Budget (APBD) corruption case which cost the state IDR 98.7 billion in the use of the 2000-2007 APBD. The Supreme Court sentenced him to six years in prison.

== Family ==
Syamsul married Fatimah Habiebie on May 26, 1974 and had three children, including Beby Arbiana, Aisia Samira, and Farid Nugraha, who died. His younger brother is Syah Afandin, who currently serves as Acting Regent of Langkah.

== Death ==
Arifin died in Jakarta on 17 October 2023, at the age of 71.

== Honours ==
=== National ===
- Lencana Melati Pramuka - 2005
- Lencana Darma Bakti Pramuka - 2003
- Bintang Legiun Veteran Indonesia - 2003
- Satyalancana Wira Karya - 2004
- Satyalencana Wira Karya (first repetition) - 2007

=== Foreign ===
- Malaysia:
  - Penang:
    - Commander of the Order of Defender of the State (DGPN) – Dato' Seri
