= Mandala Airlines Flight 091 =

2005 aviation accident in Indonesia

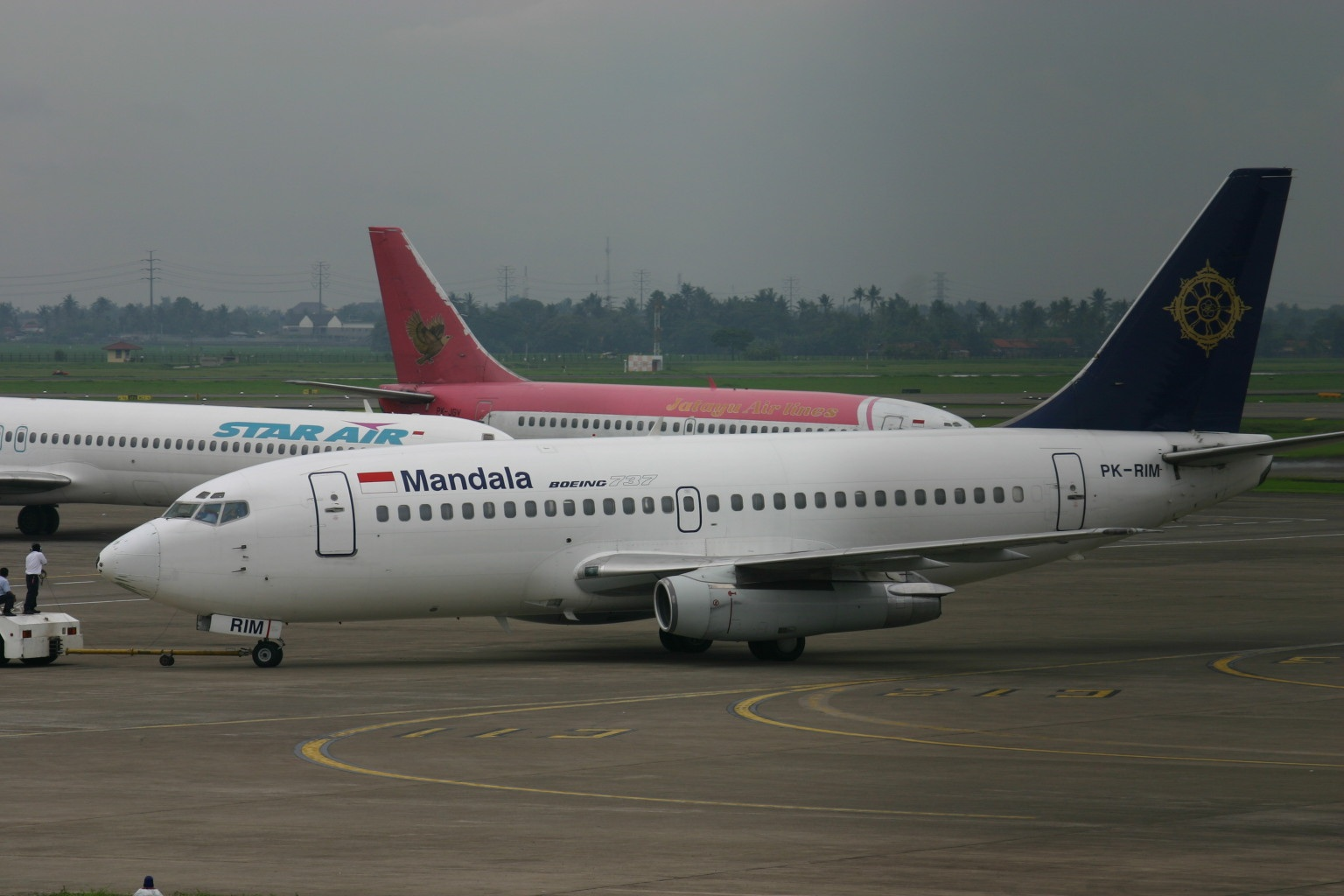
- PK-RIM, the aircraft involved, seen at Soekarno–Hatta International Airport, in 2004.

Accident
- Date: 5 September 2005
- Summary: Stalled and crashed shortly after take-off due to improper configuration and lack of crew resource management
- Site: Polonia International Airport Medan, North Sumatra, Indonesia; 3.5465°N 98.6589°E
- Total fatalities: 149
- Total injuries: 43

Aircraft
- Aircraft type: Boeing 737-230 Adv
- Operator: Mandala Airlines
- IATA flight No.: RI091
- ICAO flight No.: MDL091
- Call sign: MANDALA 091
- Registration: PK-RIM
- Flight origin: Polonia International Airport; Medan, Indonesia
- Destination: Soekarno-Hatta Int'l Airport; Jakarta, Indonesia
- Occupants: 117
- Passengers: 112
- Crew: 5
- Fatalities: 100
- Injuries: 15
- Survivors: 17

Ground casualties
- Ground fatalities: 49
- Ground injuries: 26

Mandala Airlines Flight 091 (RI091/MDL091) was a scheduled domestic passenger flight from Medan to Jakarta, operated by Mandala Airlines with a Boeing 737-200. On 5 September 2005 at 10:15 a.m. WIB (UTC+7), the aircraft stalled and crashed into a heavily populated residential area seconds after taking off from Polonia International Airport. Of the 117 passengers and crew on board, only 17 survived. An additional 49 civilians on the ground were killed, making a total of 149 fatalities.

The crash of Flight 091 was a shock to North Sumatrans as the leader of North Sumatra province, Governor Rizal Nurdin, and his predecessor, Raja Inal Siregar, were among the passengers and both were killed in the crash.

The Indonesian National Transportation Safety Committee (NTSC) concluded that the crash was caused by the actions of the flight crew, in that they did not configure the aircraft properly for take-off. The retracted flaps and slats resulted in the aircraft being unable to fly due to insufficient lift. The aircraft take-off warning was not heard and investigators stated that it was possible the pilots did not receive a warning about the improper configuration, and were therefore unaware of their erroneous actions.

== Aircraft ==
The aircraft was a Boeing 737-230 Adv with registration PK-RIM. Built in 1981, it was acquired by Mandala Airlines in October 1994. The aircraft was 24 years old at the time of the accident and had a Certificate of Airworthiness valid until November 2005.

== Passengers and crews ==
Nation	Number
Indonesia (Note: 108 passengers and 5 crew.)	113
China	2
Japan	1
Malaysia	1
Total	117

The aircraft was carrying 112 passengers and five crew members, consisting of two flight crew and three cabin crew. In total there were 114 adults and three children on board. The majority of those on board were Indonesians; however, there were also foreigners on the aircraft. The Chinese embassy in Jakarta confirmed that there were two Chinese citizens from Fujian on board Flight 091. Officials also confirmed the presence of a 3-year-old Japanese child on board Flight 091, who was killed in the crash. A 17-month-old girl and her mother were among the survivors.

Among the passengers were the incumbent governor of North Sumatra, Rizal Nurdin, and his immediate predecessor, Raja Inal Siregar. Nurdin was flying with his daughter to attend a national Indonesian governors meeting with then-President of Indonesia Susilo Bambang Yudhoyono. A member of the Indonesia Regional Representative Council (DPD), Abdul Halim, was also on board the flight.

The captain, 34-year-old Askar Timur, had 7,552 flight hours, including 7,302 hours on the Boeing 737. The first officer, 31-year-old Daufir Efendi, had 2,353 total flight hours, with 685 of them on the Boeing 737. The cabin crewmembers were Dewi Setiasih (24), Novi Maulana Sofa (22) and Agnes Retnaning Lestari (31).

== Flight ==
Flight 091 was a scheduled domestic passenger flight from Polonia International Airport (now Soewondo Air Force Base) in Medan, the largest city in Sumatra, to Soekarno-Hatta International Airport in the Indonesian capital Jakarta. Flight 091 was the second trip of the day for the aircraft, which had earlier flown from Jakarta to Medan with the same flight crew. The aircraft was pushed back at 09:52 a.m. and start-up clearance was given immediately after. It then taxied out onto Runway 23 and was cleared to take off at 10:03 a.m. with an altitude of 1,500 ft (460 m).

=== Accident ===
Flight crews then added thrust and the aircraft began rolling on the runway. As it was rolling, some passengers noted that the aircraft took longer than usual to take off from the airport, even though the aircraft was already in a nose up position. The aircraft briefly took off, then veered to the left and to the right, stalled and then the tail impacted the runway. As the tail struck the runway, it left marks on Runway 23.

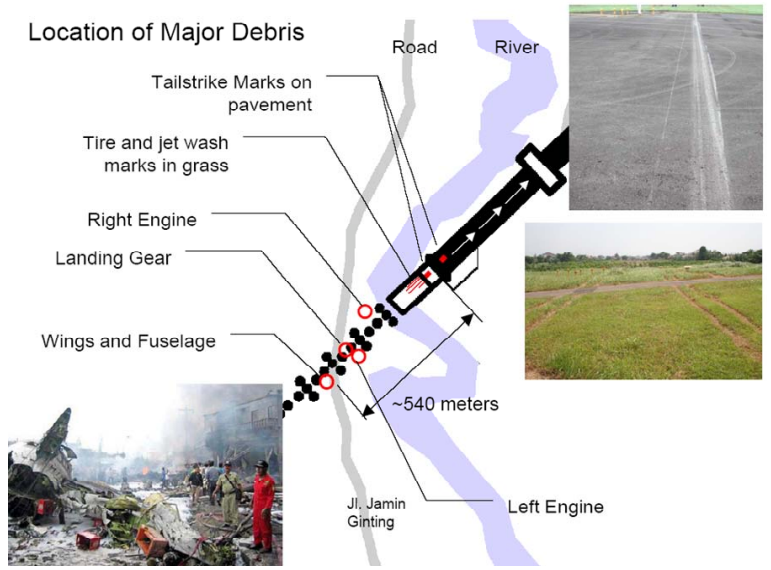
An illustration made by the NTSC on the path of Flight 091 during the crash

The aircraft then struck several approach lights located at the end of the runway before traveling across grass, crossing a small river and finally crashing onto the crowded Djamin Ginting road. Onlookers and motorists on the road panicked as the aircraft came towards them. The left wing struck a building and the aircraft exploded into flames. It broke into three parts. Passengers on the aft fuselage stated that the front part of the aircraft was obliterated as the aircraft exploded. It continued to slide onto the road, hitting multiple cars, bikes, powerlines and streetlamps and destroying several shops and houses. Several unaware drivers got their vehicles flipped by the sliding aircraft and subsequently burst into flames. The aft fuselage then came to rest in the middle of the road.

=== Immediate aftermath ===
As the aircraft's 41,000 kg (90,000 lb) of fuel ignited, it caused a massive fire in the area. Multiple houses and shops nearby caught fire, trapping residents and shoppers. The situation was chaotic and was filled with screams of residents who were searching for their relatives and families in the neighborhood, while dozens of people were seen running with their clothes alight. In the Polonia airport control tower, air traffic controllers immediately closed the airport and notified the airport's fire brigade about the crash. However, when fire crews arrived at the end of Runway 23, they realized that the crash site was outside the airport perimeter and that there was no access to the accident site.

Locals immediately assisted the search and rescue operation. Medan's firefighting units and ambulances were immediately dispatched onto the scene. As rescuers had not arrived at the crash site, multiple victims had already been transported with private cars and public minibuses. Rescuers were quickly overwhelmed by the number of victims and the number of onlookers at the crash site. As there was no coordination among the rescue team, the evacuation was severely hampered. The chaotic situation and crowded condition of the crash site rendered the evacuation process to be difficult.

Survivors escaped from the burning aircraft through a gaping hole at the front part of the remaining aft fuselage. As the fire on the aircraft intensified, residents noticed that one of the pilots was still alive. They then tried to extricate him from his seat. However, as they were unfamiliar with the seat's harness, they were unable to get him out. An explosion suddenly struck the cockpit, causing the rescuers to run away.

To ease the evacuation process, residents had to line up the bodies that they had found earlier. Indonesian Army personnel were deployed to assist the search and rescue operation. Rain then started to fall around noon, effectively dousing the flames in the area. According to residents who had tried to save the pilot, the pilot’s seat was completely burnt and his body was nowhere to be found. By this time, more than 50 bodies had been recovered. They were taken to various hospitals across Medan, mainly Adam Malik Hospital. Officials also used the hall of Polonia International Airport to store victims pending identification.

On the night of 5 September, the Indonesian Minister of Transportation Hatta Rajasa announced the death toll from the crash. A total of 149 people had been killed, of whom 49 were civilians on the ground. 17 passengers survived the accident, with 100 of those on board (including all five crew members) known to have died. Two of the survivors, a mother and her 17-month-old child, were unharmed in the crash. Most of the survivors were seated at the aft fuselage. A passenger told Indonesian news channel MetroTV from hospital that he and five other people seated in the back of the plane in Row 20 had all survived. "There was the sound of an explosion in the front and there was fire and then the aircraft fell," he said. The survivor said he escaped the blazing wreck by jumping through the torn fuselage and fleeing on foot as four large explosions erupted behind him. Officials reported that at least 16 houses and 32 vehicles had been destroyed by the crash of Flight 091.

Rizal Nurdin, the Governor of North Sumatra, former governor Raja Inal Siregar, his immediate predecessor, and Senator Abdul Halim Harahap, a member of the Regional Representative Council, were among the dead.

== Response ==
In response to the death of Senator Abdul Halim, the Indonesian Regional Representative Council declared 3 days of mourning. The Indonesian flag in the building of the People's Consultative Assembly was flown at half-mast. To honor the victims of the crash, a minute's silence was observed by the Indonesian House of Representatives. The North Sumatra provincial government also declared 3 days of mourning and ordered flags to be flown at half-mast throughout the province. Meanwhile, President Yudhoyono immediately asked the Indonesian Ministry of Transportation to investigate the crash. He postponed the national Indonesian governors meeting in Jakarta and decided to visit the crash site. He later attended the funeral of North Sumatran Governor Rizal Nurdin.

Members of the 5th Commission of the Indonesian People's Representative Council, responsible for transportation in Indonesia, announced it would summon the then-Indonesian Minister of Transportation Hatta Rajasa and representatives from Mandala Airlines in response to the crash. Speaker of the 5th Commission, Sofyan Mille, also asked the Indonesian government to regulate low-cost carriers in Indonesia in order to prevent "cost-cutting".

In the following days, the Indonesian Ministry of Transportation conducted a "special check" on multiple Boeing 737-200s from various domestic airliners at Soekarno-Hatta International Airport. The check resulted in the grounding of four Boeing 737-200s as officials reported several maintenance issues with the aircraft. The aircraft were grounded indefinitely until the operators resolved the issues.

The Indonesian Ministry of Home Affairs appointed then-deputy governor of North Sumatra Rudolf Pardede as the acting governor of North Sumatra. This decision, however, was met with opposition from members of several parties due to an alleged falsified academic certificate. Party members even threatened to walk out from every meeting attended by Pardede in the future. North Sumatran students also held a demonstration to protest the decision. This sparked a political crisis in North Sumatra which lasted until the next year. Pardede was subsequently inaugurated as the governor of North Sumatra in March 2006.

Mandala Airlines stated that they would fly relatives of the victims to Medan using two aircraft from their fleet. They later stated that a 7-day tahlil would be held at the airline's main headquarters in Jakarta. Indonesian state-owned insurance company, Jasa Raharja, announced that relatives of each person killed in the accident would receive 50 million rupiah compensation and those who were injured would receive 25 million rupiah. Vice President Jusuf Kalla reassured families that each victim would be compensated by the state.

One day after the crash, officials stated that they had been unable to identify 60 dead bodies and that a mass grave would be dug. The mass grave was dug at the same location where victims of Garuda Indonesia Flight 152 and 1979 Garuda Fokker F28 crash were buried. A mass funeral was held on 7 September and the procession was led by Abdillah, the mayor of Medan.

== Investigation ==
The investigation was carried out by the Indonesian National Transportation Safety Committee (NTSC), with assistance from the United States National Transportation Safety Board (NTSB) and representatives from Boeing as the manufacturer of the aircraft. The NTSC had also requested the Australian and Thai authorities for a readout on the black boxes. According to Rita Wijaya, a member of the NTSC, the investigation could take up to one year. She promised that the final report on the crash would be made public.

Both flight recorders were recovered immediately after the crash and were sent to the United States for a readout by the NTSB. Even though both recorders were found in good condition, the NTSC noted that there was a malfunction on the cockpit area microphone (CAM). As such, investigators could not determine the actual situation inside the cockpit due to the poor quality of the cockpit voice recorder (CVR) data.

According to investigators, since Flight 091 had difficulties in take-off, investigators decided to investigate three main possible causes; the weight and balance of the aircraft, the condition of the engines, and the configuration of the flaps and slats.

=== Cargo overload ===
Two days after the crash of Flight 091, the then-head of the Indonesian National Transportation Safety Committee, Setio Rahardjo, stated that the aircraft was carrying 2 tonnes of durians, out of the 2,749 kg (6,061 lb) of cargo on board Flight 091. The actual take-off weight of Flight 091 was 51,997 kg (114,634 lb), just 3 kg (6.6 lb) less than the Boeing 737-230 Adv's maximum take-off weight of 52,000 kg (115,000 lb). There was speculation that the massive amount of durians on board had caused the aircraft to crash. The director of Mandala Airlines, Asril Tanjung, denied that the aircraft was carrying durians, adding that such a number of durians could only be transported by multiple trucks. However, this contradicted statements from multiple witnesses who claimed that there were dozens of durians lying around the crash site. Tanjung later admitted that the aircraft did carry 2 tons of durians. During a public hearing in the Indonesian People's Representative Council, members of parliament questioned the Indonesian Minister of Transportation, Hatta Rajasa, on the presence of durians on board. Hatta did not comment on the matter, and reminded the public and the media to not speculate on the cause of the crash.

Calculations made by investigators later concluded that the center of gravity had not shifted and that the aircraft was stable for take-off. While the take-off weight was 3 kg less than what the pilot had requested (52,000 kg; 115,000 lb), it was 393 kg (866 lb) less than the maximum take-off weight for this particular condition. As such, the aircraft's weight was not a factor in the crash.

The rumors that durians had caused the crash of Flight 091, however, persists.

=== Engine failure ===
In the aftermath of the crash, news media speculated that the crash had been caused by a malfunctioning engine, stating that a “pen clip” on one of the aircraft’s engines had failed and ultimately caused an engine failure. There were also reports that one of its engines had fallen onto the runway. NTSC expressed their disappointment over these reports and asked the public and the media not to issue unconfirmed information on the possible causes of the crash as the investigation was still ongoing.

Data obtained from NTSC, however, confirmed that the aircraft had previously experienced engine failure. On 29 January 2003, while rolling to take off from Achmad Yani International Airport in Semarang, the left engine caught fire. The tower tried to inform the crew of the situation, but the pilots were busy, and so they did not respond. After the aircraft was airborne, the tower repeated the information and the pilots answered, explaining that the No. 1 engine had failed. The pilot said that they would make a right turn to base. The aircraft landed safely. After inspection, it was found that the No. 1 engine was covered by animal wool.

Inspection of the wreckage did not indicate any sort of engine failure on board Flight 091. Both engines were being operated at high power setting during impact and no sign of overheating was observed. Both engines operated at normal performance. Thus, engine failure was not a factor in the crash.

=== Retracted flaps and slats ===
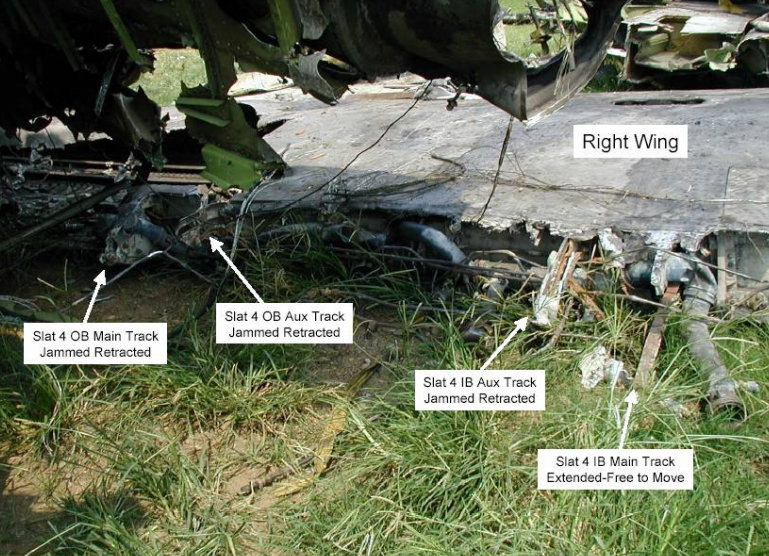
The investigation team discovered that the flaps and slats had been set in retracted position

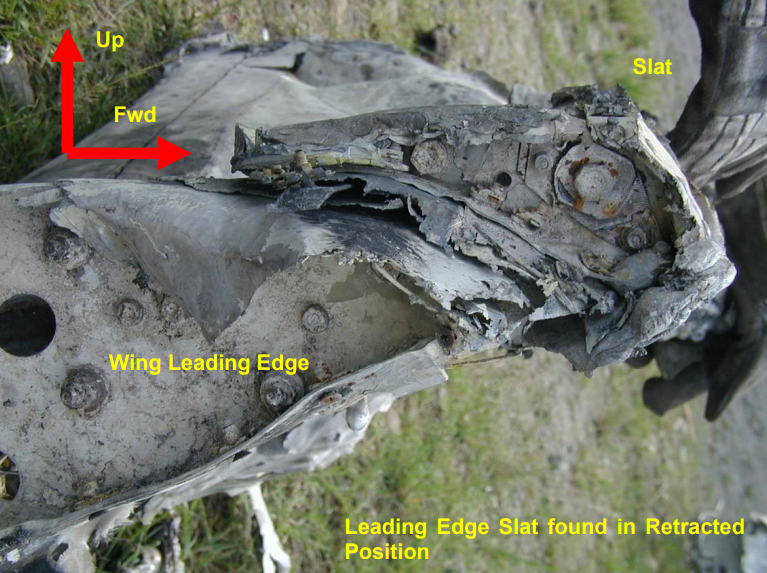
A close-up look on the slats. The slats were in retracted position

During the field investigation, the NTSC managed to recover six out of eight flap jackscrews, and all of them were in the retracted position. The team also discovered a piece of the slats. The piece revealed that the slats were in the retracted position. They concluded that both flaps and slats on Flight 091 had not been extended. Investigators stated that there were three possible reasons for the retracted position of the flaps; flap asymmetry, flap system failure, or flight crew error. Findings on the wreckage concluded that all 6 flap jackscrews were in the exact same position. All of the screws, which originated from the left and right flap, were in zero position (retracted). Therefore, flap asymmetry was ruled out as the reason for the retracted flaps and slats. The investigation then shifted to a failure of the flap system. Examination of the wreckage could not identify faults that could affect the flap actuator and flap position indicator system. Only limited single faults were identified that could affect the systems simultaneously. Maintenance records from the last six months also did not indicate any abnormalities on the flap actuator and flap position indicator system. Thus, investigators concluded that failure of the flap system was unlikely.

Flight crew error became the main suspect in the investigation. If the flaps and slats had not been extended, then the take-off configuration warning should have warned the crews about the improper setting. Due to the poor quality of the CVR, investigators could not determine whether the warning had sounded or not during the flight. The aircraft maintenance records showed that the take-off warning horn had been checked and maintained in accordance with the proper procedure and that there were no complaints about the take-off warning system. However, there was a possibility that the warning had not sounded, causing the crew to fail to notice the improper configuration.

Regardless of the aural warning, the crews should have noticed that the flaps and slats were in retracted condition. The flight checklist provided clues for the pilots on whether the flaps and slats had been extended or not. If the flaps and slats had been set in the retracted position, then they would have not seen an illuminated green light and the flap indicator would have indicated a retracted (zero) position. Also, since Flight 091 was asked to hold for 3 minutes prior to its take-off, the flight crews had sufficient time to conduct the flight checklist.

=== Conclusion ===
The official final report on the accident was published by the National Transportation Safety Committee (NTSC) of Indonesia on 1 January 2009. According to the report, the probable causes of the accident were the following:

- The aircraft took off with an improper take-off configuration, namely with retracted flaps and slats causing the aircraft failed [sic] to lift off.
- Improper checklist procedure execution had led to failure to identify the flap in retract position.
- The aircraft's take-off warning system horn was not heard on the CAM channel of the CVR. It is possible that the take-off configuration warning was not sounding.

The report also criticised the lack of coordination among rescuers, which possibly could have caused the deaths of people who had survived the crash earlier as rescuers did not arrive in time. For example, during the crash the airport fire brigade decided to dispatch a limited number of firefighting units to the crash site after considering that the crash was located outside of the airport area. The other firefighting units were told to remain in place, despite the airport being closed. Additional lack of infrastructure led to confusion among the rescuers in locating the crash site, thus hampering the search and rescue effort.

The NTSC issued several recommendations to Mandala Airlines and the Indonesian Directorate General of Civil Aviation (DGCA). One of these was a request for the DGCA to mandate airports in Indonesia to conduct a real-time exercise of their Airport Emergency Plan at least once a year.

== Legacy ==
Prior to the crash of Mandala Airlines Flight 091, members of the National Transportation Safety Committee worked voluntarily, receiving no salary from the Indonesian government. After the crash, members of NTSC were paid according to a pre-determined salary.

To honour the death of the North Sumatran Governor, Indonesian President Yudhoyono posthumously awarded Nurdin with Bintang Mahaputra, the second highest honor in Indonesia. The newly-built North Sumatran Government Archive and Library was named after Nurdin by North Sumatran governor for the 2016–2018 period, Tengku Erry Nuradi.

== See also ==
- List of accidents and incidents involving commercial aircraft
- List of aircraft accidents and incidents resulting in at least 50 fatalities

=== Similar accidents ===
- Viasa Flight 742 (1969)
- British European Airways Flight 548 (1972)
- Lufthansa Flight 540 (1974)
- Northwest Airlines Flight 255 (1987)
- Delta Air Lines Flight 1141 (1988)
- LAPA Flight 3142 (1999)
- Spanair Flight 5022 (2008)
