= University of North Sumatra =

University in Indonesia

Coordinates: 3.5617°N 98.6563°E

Universitas Sumatera Utara
- Universitas Sumatera Utara
- Motto: Era Keunggulan Tertinggi
- Motto in English: The Era of Ultimate Excellence
- Type: Public
- Established: 20 November 1957 (designated as public university); 20 August 1952
- Rector: Prof. Dr. Muryanto Amin, S.Sos., M.Si.
- Academic staff: 1,459 (S2/Sp1), 1,409 (S3/Sp2)
- Administrative staff: 1,020
- Students: 50,809
- Location: Jl. Dr. T. Mansur No. 9, Padang Bulan, Medan, North Sumatra, Indonesia
- Campus: Padang Bulan Kwala Bekala
- Colors: Green
- Nickname: USU
- Website: usu.ac.id

Universitas Sumatera Utara, commonly known as USU is a public university located in the city of Medan in North Sumatra, Indonesia.

It is situated in Padang Bulan, in the Medan Baru subdistrict of Medan, close to the City Centre, with a total area of 122 hectares. Due to an increase in the number of students, a new campus is being constructed in Kwala Bekala, about 15 kilometers away from the original campus, on an area of about 300 hectares.

The rectors of the university serve an eight-year renewable term.

USU was established as a Foundation Universitet North Sumatera on June 4, 1952. Initially, the foundation provided only one department, which was the Faculty of Medicine, established on August 20, 1952, now commemorated as the anniversary of USU. The first President of Indonesia, Sukarno, inaugurated USU on November 20, 1957, as the seventh state university in Indonesia.

== History ==
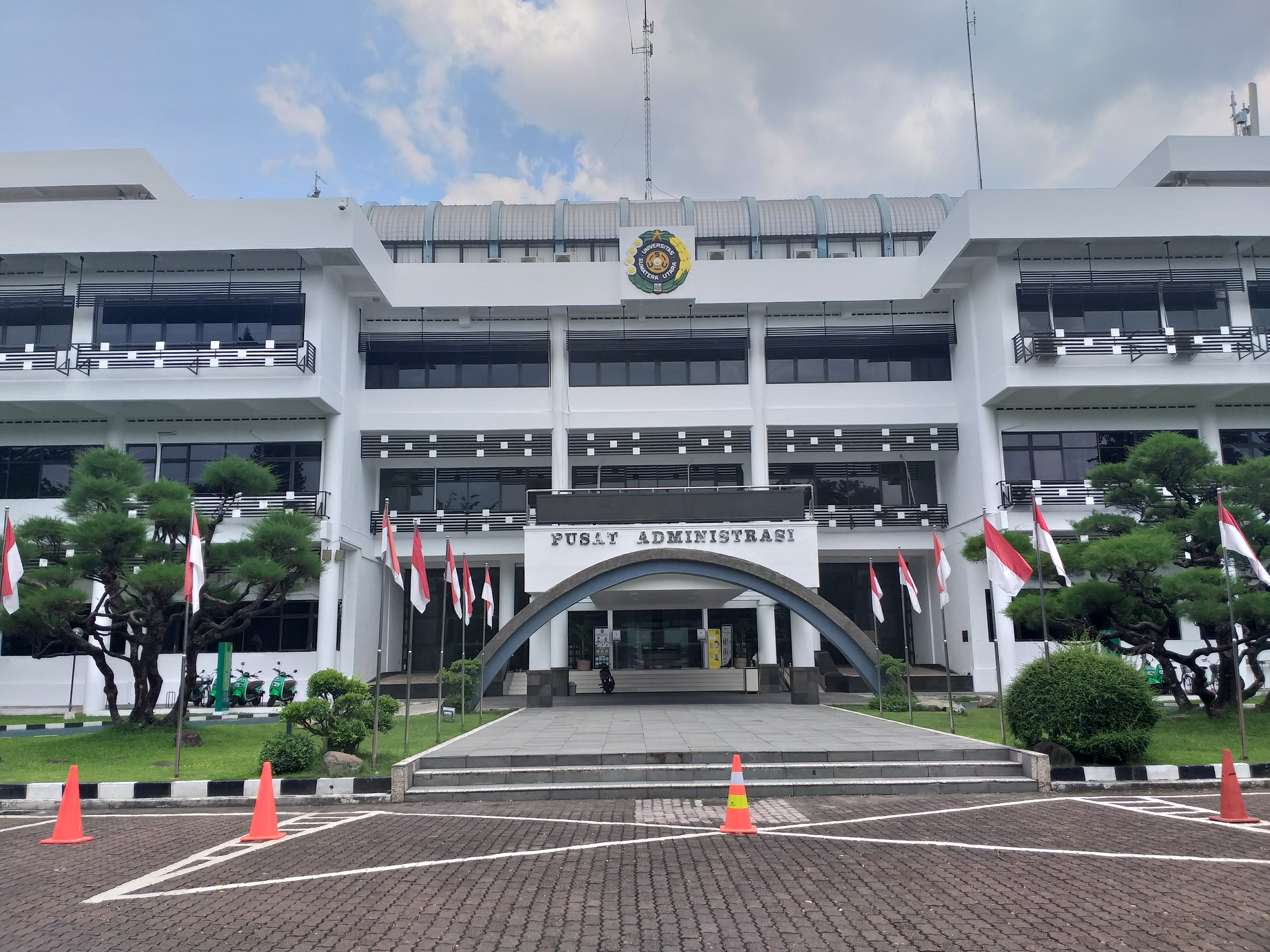
USU rectorate and administrative building

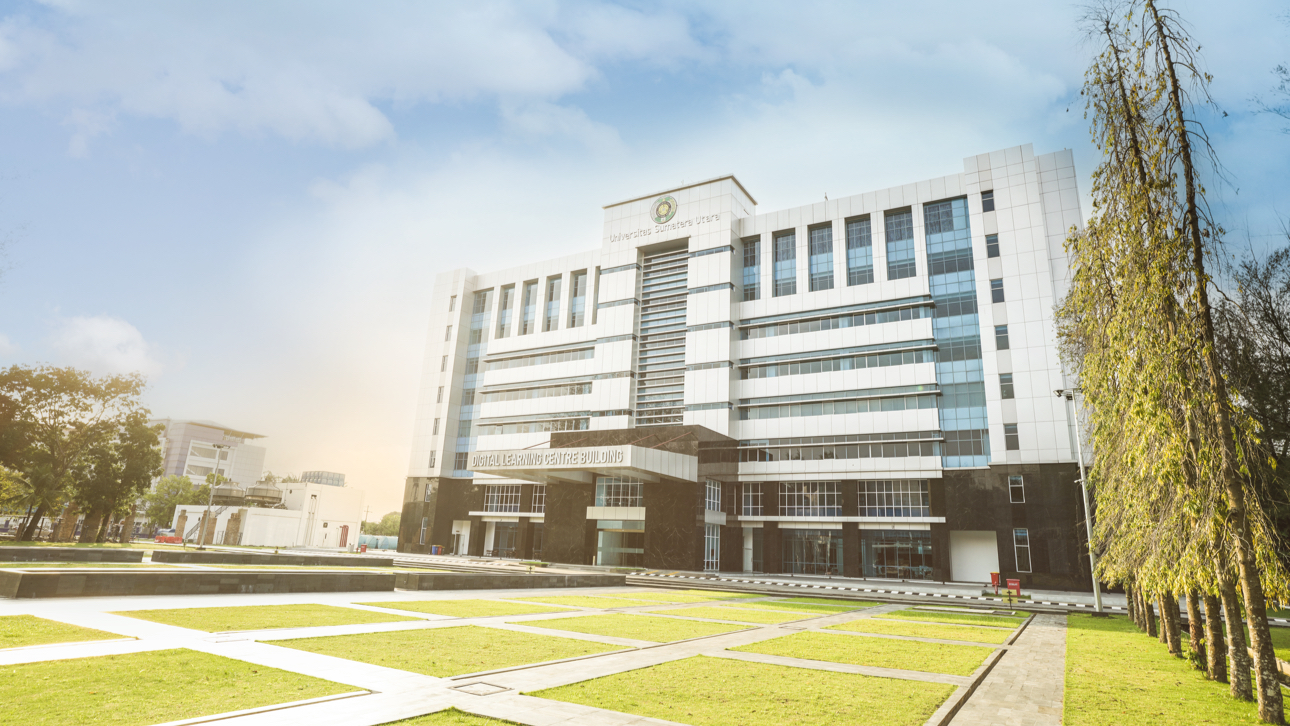
USU Digital Learning Center

The history of the USU began with the founding of North Sumatra Universitet Foundation on June 4, 1952.The establishment of the foundation was spearheaded by the governor of North Sumatra to meet the wishes of the people of North Sumatra, Indonesia, in particular, and society, in general.

The foundation was managed by a board, chaired by the governor of North Sumatra, with the following composition:

- Abdul Hakim Harahap (Chairman)
- Dr. T. Mansoer (Vice Chairman)
- Dr. Soemarsono (Secretary / Treasurer)
- Members:
  - Ir. R. S. Danunagoro
  - Drh. Sahar
  - Drg. Oh Tjie Lien
  - Anwar Abubakar
  - Madong Lubis
  - Dr. Maas. J. Trees
  - Drg. Barlan
  - Soetan Paruhum Pane

The desire to establish a public university in Medan began before the World War II, but it was not approved by the Dutch colonial government who ruled Indonesia at the time. During the Japanese occupation after the fall of the Dutch colonialism, some prominent people in the Indonesian medicine field, such

University rankings

Regional – Overall
- QS Asia: 329 (2025)

as Dr. Pirngadi and Dr. T. Mansoer, drafted a plan for a medical school. After Indonesia declared its independence on August 17, 1945, the government appointed Dr. Mohd. Djamil in Bukit Tinggi as the chairman of the committee to establish the plan. However, another revolutionary war in 1947, that required the restoration of the sovereignty of the Indonesian government, delayed this plan. Then the North Sumatra Governor, Abdul Hakim, took the initiative to encourage the residents of North Sumatra province to raise the money to build the first public university in the region.

On December 31, 1951, the preparatory committee to found the university was formed, chaired by Dr. Soemarsono. The members of the committee included Dr. Ahmad Sofian, Ir. Danunagoro, and Mr. Djaidin Antique as the secretary. Aside from the committee, the Leadership Council Foundation was also established. In its early years, the Organization of USU was consisted of the board of curators, the university president, the assembly president and assessors, the university senate, and the faculty board.

As a result of the cooperation, moral and material assistance from the entire community of the North Sumatera province at that time, including the Special Territory of Aceh, the Faculty of Medicine was successfully established on August 20, 1952. It was first housed in a building on Seram Street, with twenty-seven students, among them were two females.

Afterward, the establishment of the Faculty of Law and Public Administration followed in 1954. The Faculty of Teaching and Science Education was found in 1956, along with the Faculty of Agriculture.

On November 20, 1957, the first president of the Republic of Indonesia, Sukarno, inaugurated the University of North Sumatra (with "USU" as the acronym in the local language). It became the seventh state university in Indonesia. The inauguration date was set as the Dies Natalis USU (the anniversary of the University of North Sumatra), and commemorated every year until 2001.

At the suggestion of several members of the University Senate, the date of the anniversary of the University of North Sumatra was then reviewed. The University Senate eventually decided that the date of the USU anniversary should be commemorated on August 20, considering that the university had conducted its very first lecture on August 20, 1952. With the approval of the Ministry of National Education, the University of North Sumatra commemorated its 50th anniversary on August 20, 2002.

In 1959, the university started the Faculty of Engineering and the Faculty of Economics in Medan. It was also inaugurated by President Sukarno. A year later, in 1960, the university opened the Faculty of Economics and the Faculty of Veterinary Medicine and Animal Husbandry in Kutaradja, Banda Aceh. Less than a decade after being founded, USU was already running seven departments: five faculties in Medan, North Sumatra, and two faculties in the Aceh province. So much progress had been achieved within a short time, with the implementation of various programs.

Today the University of North Sumatra provides more than one hundred study programs, consisted of various levels of higher education, covered in ten faculties and one graduate department. During the process, some departments of the university have become the embryos of three public universities, namely the Syiah Kuala University in Banda Aceh, Aceh Province (the expansion of the Faculty of Economics and the Faculty of Veterinary Medicine and Animal Husbandry); the Medan College of State Teachers and Trainings (the expansion of the Faculty of Teaching and Science Education); and the Medan Polytechnic College (the Polytechnic College of the University of North Sumatra).

== Faculties ==
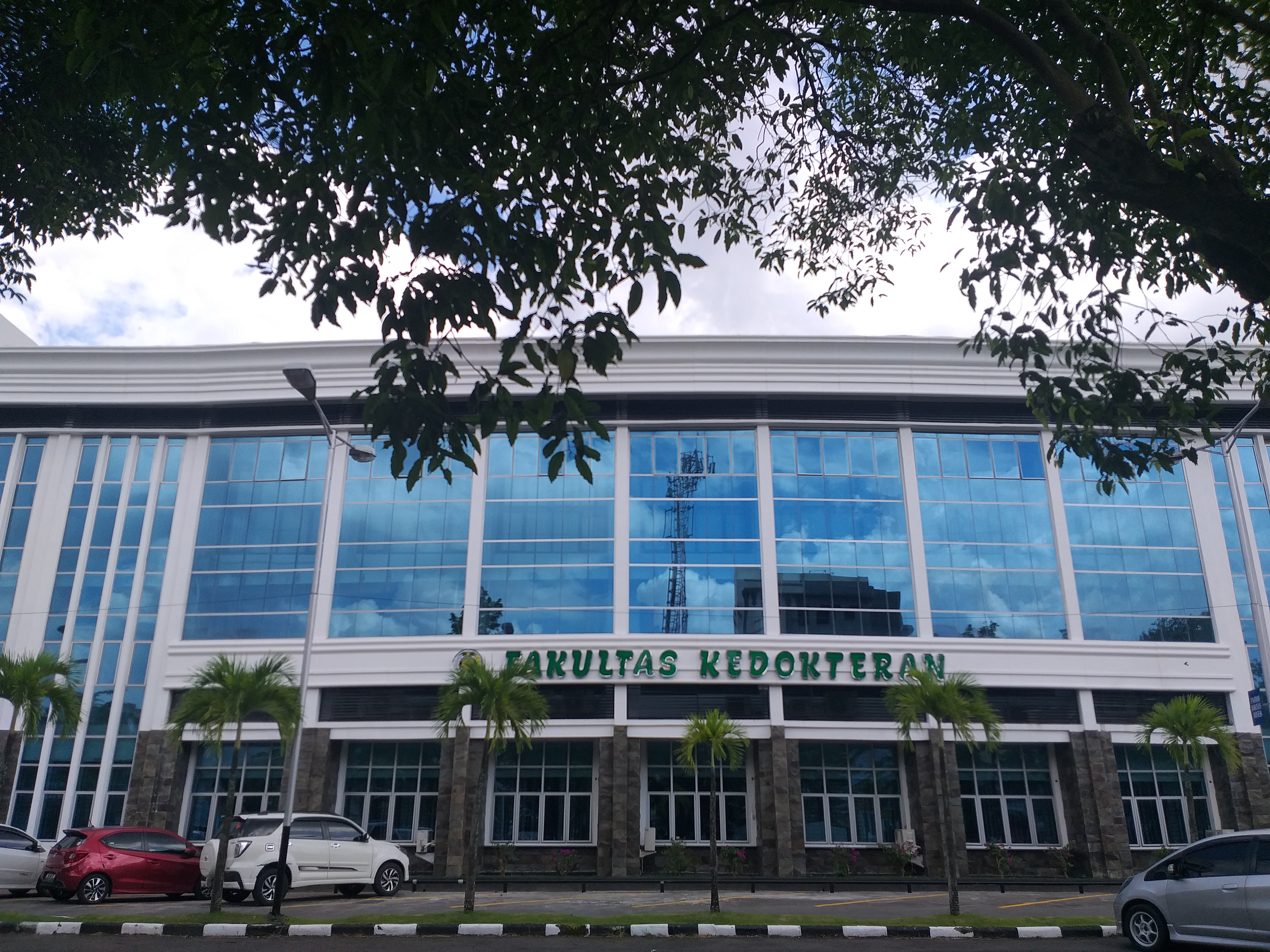
Medical Faculty Building

- Graduate School
- Faculty of Nursing
- Faculty of Psychology
- Faculty of Pharmacy
- Faculty of Public Health
- Faculty of Social and Political Sciences
- Faculty of Mathematics and Natural Sciences
- Faculty of Literature
- Faculty of Dentistry
- Faculty of Economics and Business
- Faculty of Engineering
- Faculty of Agriculture
- Faculty of Forestry
- Faculty of Law
- Faculty of Medicine
- Faculty of Computer Science and Information Technology

== USU Teaching Hospital ==
University of Sumatera Utara is the biggest teaching hospital in Indonesia.

== Alumni ==
- H. S. Dillon, politician
- Musa Rajekshah, former Vice Governor of North Sumatra, member of the House of Representatives
- Surya Paloh, Chairman of NasDem Party
- Tengku Erry Nuradi, Governor of North Sumatra
- Yasonna Laoly, Minister of Law and Human Rights
