= Raja Inal Siregar =

Indonesian politician (1938–2005)

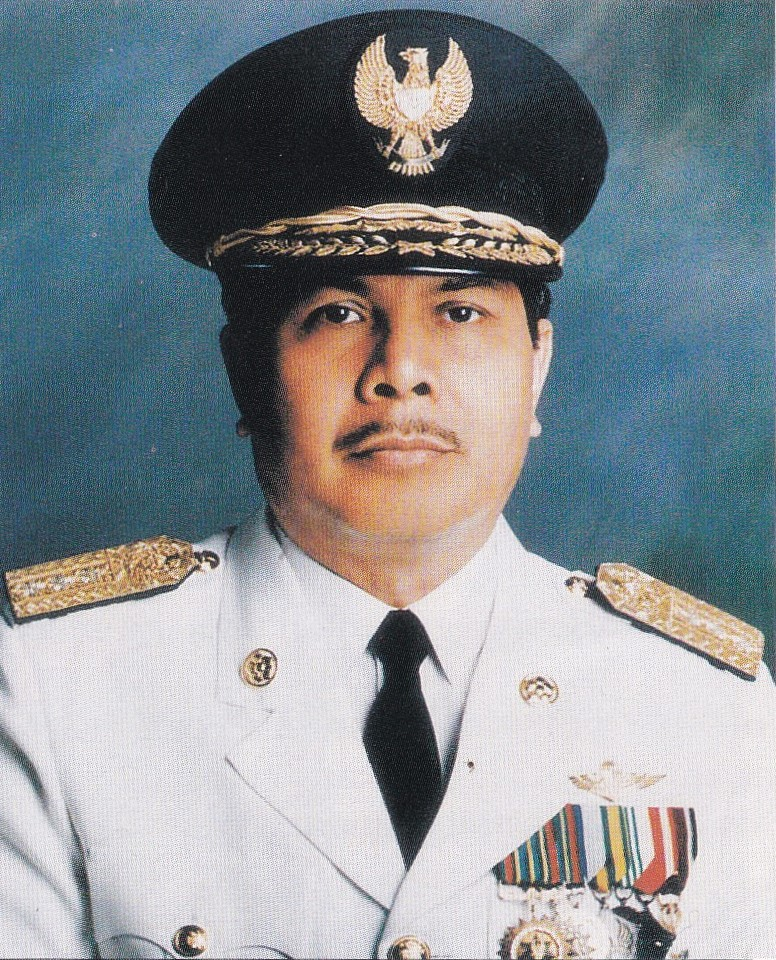

14th Governor of North Sumatra
- In office 13 June 1988 – 15 June 1998
- President: Suharto; B. J. Habibie
- Preceded by: Kaharuddin Nasution
- Succeeded by: Rizal Nurdin

Personal details
- Born: 5 March 1938 Medan, Dutch East Indies
- Died: 5 September 2005 (aged 67) Medan, Indonesia
- Cause of death: Plane crash
- Spouse: Yuniar Pane
- Children: 4
- Education: Military Academy (1961)

Military service
- Branch/service: Indonesian Army
- Years of service: 1961–1988
- Rank: Lieutenant General (honorary)
- Unit: Infantry

Raja Inal Siregar (5 March 1938 – 5 September 2005) was an Indonesian military officer and politician who was governor of North Sumatra from 1988 to 1998. He was among the Mandala Airlines Flight 091 crash victims, succumbing to his injuries a day after the crash. He was said to be on his way to talks with then-Indonesian President Susilo Bambang Yudhoyono at the time.
