= Tengku Rizal Nurdin =

Indonesian politician

Major General (Ret.) Rizal Nurdin
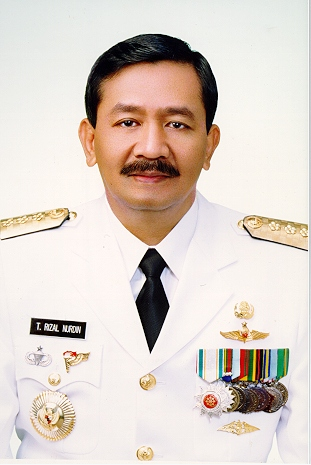

13th Governor of North Sumatra
- In office 15 June 1998 – 5 September 2005
- President: B. J. Habibie; Abdurrahman Wahid; Megawati Soekarnoputri; Susilo Bambang Yudhoyono
- Preceded by: Raja Inal Siregar
- Succeeded by: Rudolf Pardede

Personal details
- Born: 21 February 1948 Bukittinggi, Indonesia
- Died: 5 September 2005 (aged 57) Medan, Indonesia
- Cause of death: Plane crash
- Spouse: Hj. NR Siti Maryam
- Children: T. Armilla Madiana; T. Arisma Mellina
- Occupation: Military

Military service
- Allegiance: Indonesia
- Branch/service: Indonesian Army
- Years of service: 1971–1998
- Rank: Major General
- Unit: Infantry

Haji Tengku Rizal Nurdin (21 February 1948 – 5 September 2005) was an Indonesian military general who served as the 13th governor of North Sumatra from 1998 until his death in 2005. He was among the victims of the Mandala Airlines Flight 091 crash along with his predecessor Raja Inal Siregar.

Before becoming governor, he was Bukit Barisan Territorial Military Commander I in 1997, in the rank of major general. Although born in West Sumatra, he was a Deli Malay.

He was appointed North Sumatran Governor on 15 June 1998. He was reappointed for a second term on 24 March 2003, which would have ended in 2008.

He was married to Hj. NR Siti Maryam (born 1948), with whom they shared two daughters, T. Armilla Madiana and T. Arisma Mellina. In additional, Rizal Nurdin was also the Head of North Sumatran KONI.

== Education ==
1. Elementary School – completed in Medan 1961
2. Junior High School – completed in Medan 1964
3. Senior High School – completed in Medan 1967
4. School of Social and Political Science – completed in Jakarta 1996

== Military education ==
1. Sussarpara - in Batujajar 1969
2. Land Akabri (Republic of Indonesian’s Armed Forces Academy) - in Magelang 1971
3. Sussarcabif - in Bandung 1971
4. Ranger/Airborne Course - in USA 1974
5. Instructor Course – in USA 1980
6. Inf Mortar Training - in USA 1980
7. Inf Off Advance Course – in USA 1980
8. Sus Dan Yonif - in Bandung 1985
9. Seskoad - in Bandung 1988

== Rank history ==
1. Second lieutenant – 1 December 1971
2. First lieutenant – 1 April 1974
3. Captain – 1 April 1977
4. Major – 1 October 1981
5. Lieutenant colonel - 1 October 1986
6. Colonel - 1 October 1992
7. TNI Brigadier General – 1 February 1995
8. TNI Major General – 1 August 1997

== Career ==
1. Danton Brigif Linud 18 Kostrad - 1972
2. Danton 3/A Yon 501 Kostrad - 1973
3. Danki A Yonif 501 Kostrad - 1976
4. Danyonif 321 Brigif 13 - 1985
5. Dandim 0403 Rem 044 Gapo - 1988
6. UN Head Representative -Untac in Laos - 1993
7. Dan Secapa TNI Land Forces - 1995
8. Chief of Staff of Bukit Barisan I Regional Military Command - 1996
9. Commander of Bukit Barisan I Regional Military Command - 1997
10. Governor of North Sumatra - 1998–2003
11. Governor of North Sumatra - 2003-2008 (died in office)
