= Governor of North Sumatra =

Head of government of the Indonesian province of North Sumatra

- Gubernur Sumatera Utara ᯎᯮᯅᯩᯒ᯲ᯉᯮᯒ᯲ ᯘᯮᯔᯖᯩᯒ ᯥᯖᯒ
- Coat of arms of North Sumatra

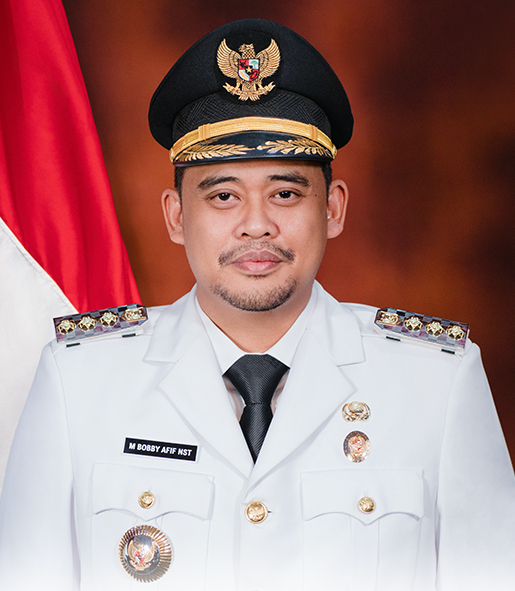
- Incumbent; Bobby Nasution since 20 February 2025
- Style: Mr. Governor (informal); The Honorable (formal) His Excellency (diplomatic)
- Type: Chief executive
- Status: Head of government
- Abbreviation: GONS (in English); Gub. Sumut (in Indonesian)
- Residence: Official Residence of the Governor of North Sumatra, Medan
- Seat: Medan
- Nominator: Political parties
- Appointer: Direct popular elections within North Sumatra or President members of the North Sumatra Regional House of Representatives (formerly)
- Term length: Five years, renewable once 1 years (specifically for the acting governor)
- Precursor: Governor of Sumatra
- Formation: 19 June 1948
- First holder: Sutan Mohammad Amin Nasution
- Deputy: Vice Governor of North Sumatra
- Salary: Rp3 million (US$179,47) per month
- Website: www.sumutprov.go.id/artikel/halaman/gubernur-dan-wakil-gubernur

The Governor of North Sumatra (Indonesian: Gubernur Sumatera Utara) is the highest office in the province of North Sumatra. The governor of North Sumatra is an elected official who is responsible for leading the government in North Sumatra, proposing and enacting regional laws, and representing the North Sumatra province inside and outside the court. The governor alongside the vice governor and 100 members of the North Sumatra Regional House of Representatives (DPRD) are accountable for the strategic government of the province of North Sumatra.

== Origin ==
=== Governor of Sumatra and Junior Governor of North Sumatra ===
After the proclamation of Indonesian Independence, the newly formed central government of Indonesia immediately formed provinces for the regional administration of the country's territory. Sumatra was established as a province on 19 August 1945. At the session of the Preparatory Committee for Indonesian Independence on the same day, Teuku Muhammad Hasan was nominated as the Governor of Sumatra. Sukarno as the President of Indonesia approved his nomination. On 22 August 1945, Teuku Muhammad Hasan was appointed as the "representative of the President of Indonesia in Sumatra". His appointment as the Governor of Sumatra was enacted by the President of Indonesia via telegram on 29 September 1945, while the formal decree was enacted a year later on 29 September 1946.

Following the telegram, Hasan as the Governor of Sumatra began appointing residents, regents, and mayors of the residencies, regencies, and cities. Hasan also formed several governmental bureaus to assist the governor in its day-to-day tasks, such as the Financial Bureau, Health Bureau, Education Bureau, Information Bureau, etc. He was also tasked for negotiating with the Japanese forces and the Allied forces, forming the armed forces in Sumatra, appointing members of the People's Representative Council of Sumatra, and coordinating the printing of banknote for Sumatra. He was given legislation power to enact regional laws in Sumatra for regulating the populace affairs.

For about a year, it was realized that due to the difficulties of interregional communication, a separate governor's office for the three main regions of Sumatra (North Sumatra, Central Sumatra, South Sumatra) was needed. On 17 December 1947, Hasan officially declared the formation of the junior governor's office for the three main regions. Four months later, on 14 April 1948, Sutan Mohammad Amin Nasution was inaugurated as the Junior Governor of North Sumatra. This made North Sumatra the first province to inaugurate its own governor, and soon after, the rest of the regions followed suit. The region's decision to inaugurate its own junior governor was formally enacted by the People's Representative Council of Sumatra at its session from 17 until 19 April 1948. The council decided to divide the province of Sumatra into three sub-provinces, based on the region.

=== Formation and temporary dissolution ===
The leadership of the junior governors in their sub-province continued de facto independently from the Governor of Sumatra. Realizing this, the central government in Java enacted the Law No. 10 of 1948 on 15 April 1948 that formally dissolved the government of Sumatra and divided Sumatra into three provinces: North Sumatra, Central Sumatra, and South Sumatra. Nasution was promoted from the post of junior governor to governor, and he was inaugurated by President Sukarno as the Governor of North Sumatra on 19 June 1948.

Less than a year, the central government in Java fell to the Dutch forces after the Operation Kraai on 19 December 1948. Before being captured by the Dutch, President Sukarno sent a telegraph message to Sjafruddin Prawiranegara in Bukittinggi giving him a mandate to create a "Republic of Indonesia government in exile". Three days later, the Emergency Government of the Republic of Indonesia, based in Bukittinggi, West Sumatra, was established. On 17 May 1949, the emergency government officially dissolved the office of governor and the post of government commissioner was formed. Nasution became the government commissioner for North Sumatra. Since then, civilian affairs were handed over to the military governor.

On 17 December 1949, the emergency government announced the division of North Sumatra into two different provinces: the province of Aceh and the province of Tapanuli/East Sumatra. It was not until fifteen days later that this division was finally enacted. The province of Aceh was formed on 1 January 1950 with its governor Daud Beureu'eh, and the province of Tapanuli/East Sumatra was formed on 1 February 1950 with its governor Ferdinand Lumban Tobing.

On 27 December 1949, the United States of Indonesia was formed. The State of East Sumatra was declared as dissolved and merged to Indonesia by the Wali Negara of East Sumatra, Tengku Mansur, on 15 August 1950. Two days later, on 17 August 1950, the province of Aceh and Tapanuli/East Sumatra was re-merged into the province of North Sumatra. The Chairman of the Preparatory Committee of the Unitary State for East Sumatra, Sarimin Reksodihardjo, became acting governor. He handed over his position to the definitive Governor of North Sumatra, Abdul Hakim Harahap, on 25 January 1951.

== Powers and duties ==
The powers and duties of the Governor of North Sumatra are regulated by Article 65.1 and 65.2 of Law No. 23 of 2014 about the Regional Government.

=== Powers ===
The Governor of North Sumatra is entitled to:

- submit draft for the regional laws
- enact legislation that have been approved by the Regional People's Representative Council of North Sumatra
- enact gubernatorial laws and gubernatorial decrees;
- take certain actions in urgent circumstances which are needed by the regional and/or community;
- carry out other authorities in accordance with the provisions of the legislation.

=== Duties ===
The Governor of North Sumatra has the duty to:

- lead the implementation of government affairs under the provincial jurisdiction following the provisions of the legislation and policies enacted by the legislature;
- maintain peace and order in society;
- prepare and submit the draft law on Regional Long-Term Development Plan of North Sumatra and laws about Regional Medium-Term Development Plan of North Sumatra to the Regional People's Representative Council of North Sumatra and to be discussed with Regional People's Representative Council of North Sumatra, and to enact the Regional Government Work Plan;
- prepare and draft regional laws about the provincial budget, the draft law on changes to the provincial budget, and the draft law on the accountability of the provincial budget to the Regional People's Representative Council of North Sumatra to be discussed jointly;
- represent the Province of North Sumatra inside and outside of the court and may appoint legal counsel to represent him following the provisions of the legislation
- perform other duties following the provisions of the legislation

== Election ==
=== Method ===
From 1948 until 1957, the Regional People's Representative Council of North Sumatra only recommends the candidates for the Governor of North Sumatra to the president or the Minister of Internal Affairs, while the president or the Minister of Internal Affairs may elect and inaugurate the elected governor.

After the enactment of Law No. 1 of 1957 on 18 January 1957, the Governor of North Sumatra was nominated and elected by the Regional People's Representative Council of North Sumatra. The president or the Minister of Internal Affairs only had the right to cancel/confirm the election results and inaugurate the elected governor.

After 2004, the governor — along with the deputy governor — was directly elected by the people. The first direct gubernatorial election was held on 24 April 2008, on which the governor and deputy governor Syamsul Arifin and Gatot Pujo Nugroho won the election.

=== Most recent election ===
The most recent election was held on 27 June 2018. There were 2 contesting pairs in that election, Edy Rahmayadi and Musa Rajekshah against Djarot Saiful Hidayat and Sihar Sitorus. The election was won by the Edy Rahmayadi-Musa Rajekshah pair by 57.58% of the vote.

== Concurrent offices ==
From 1948 until 1959, the Governor of North Sumatra assumed the office as the Chairman and member of the Regional Government Council. Members of the Regional Government Council were elected by the Regional People's Representative Council with regards to the political composition inside the council. The Regional Government Council has a term of 5 years, and was responsible to the Regional People's Representative Council. In 1959, the Regional Government Council was dissolved and was replaced by the Daily Government Board. The board did not have any leadership, and members of the board are appointed and responsible to the governor.

After the enactment of the Law No. 16 of 1969 on 17 December 1969, the incumbent governor of North Sumatra became the ex officio member of the People's Consultative Assembly. The incumbent governor became a member of the North Sumatra's Regional Delegation fraction of the assembly. This ex-officio membership was abolished after the enactment of the Law No. 4 of 1999 on 1 February 1999, when the new law banned an incumbent governor from becoming a member of the People's Consultative Assembly.

As of today, the Governor of North Sumatra did not assume any concurrent offices.

== See also ==
- Governor
- Politics of Indonesia

== Bibliography ==
- Ibrahim, Muhammad (1983). Mr. Teoekoe Moehammad Hasan: Karya dan Pengabdiannya (PDF) (in Indonesian). Jakarta: Ministry of Education and Culture.
- Tim Penyusun (1976), Sumatera Utara membangun (in Indonesian), vol. 1, Medan: Pemerintah Daerah Sumatera Utara
- Toer, Pramoedya Ananta; Toer, Koesalah Soebagyo; Kamil, Ediati (1999), Kronik revolusi Indonesia: 1948, Jakarta: Kepustakaan Populer Gramedia
- Tuk Wan Haria, Muhammad (2006), Gubernur Sumatera dan Para Gubernur Sumatera Utara [Governor of Sumatra and Governors of North Sumatra] (in Indonesian), Medan: Library and Regional Archives Bureau of North Sumatra, ISBN 9789791521208
- Rismadona; Zubir, Zusneli (2014), Sumpur Kudus Dalam Perjalanan Sejarah Minangkabau Tahun 1942—1965 [Sumpur Kudus in the Historical Journey of Minangkabau from 1942—1965] (PDF) (in Indonesian), Padang: Balai Pelestarian Nilai Budaya (BPNB) Padang
- Information Bureau of North Sumatra (1953), Republik Indonesia: Propinsi Sumatera Utara (PDF) (in Indonesian), Medan: Ministry of Information
