= Mayor of Medan =

- Wali Kota Medan
- Coat of arms of Medan

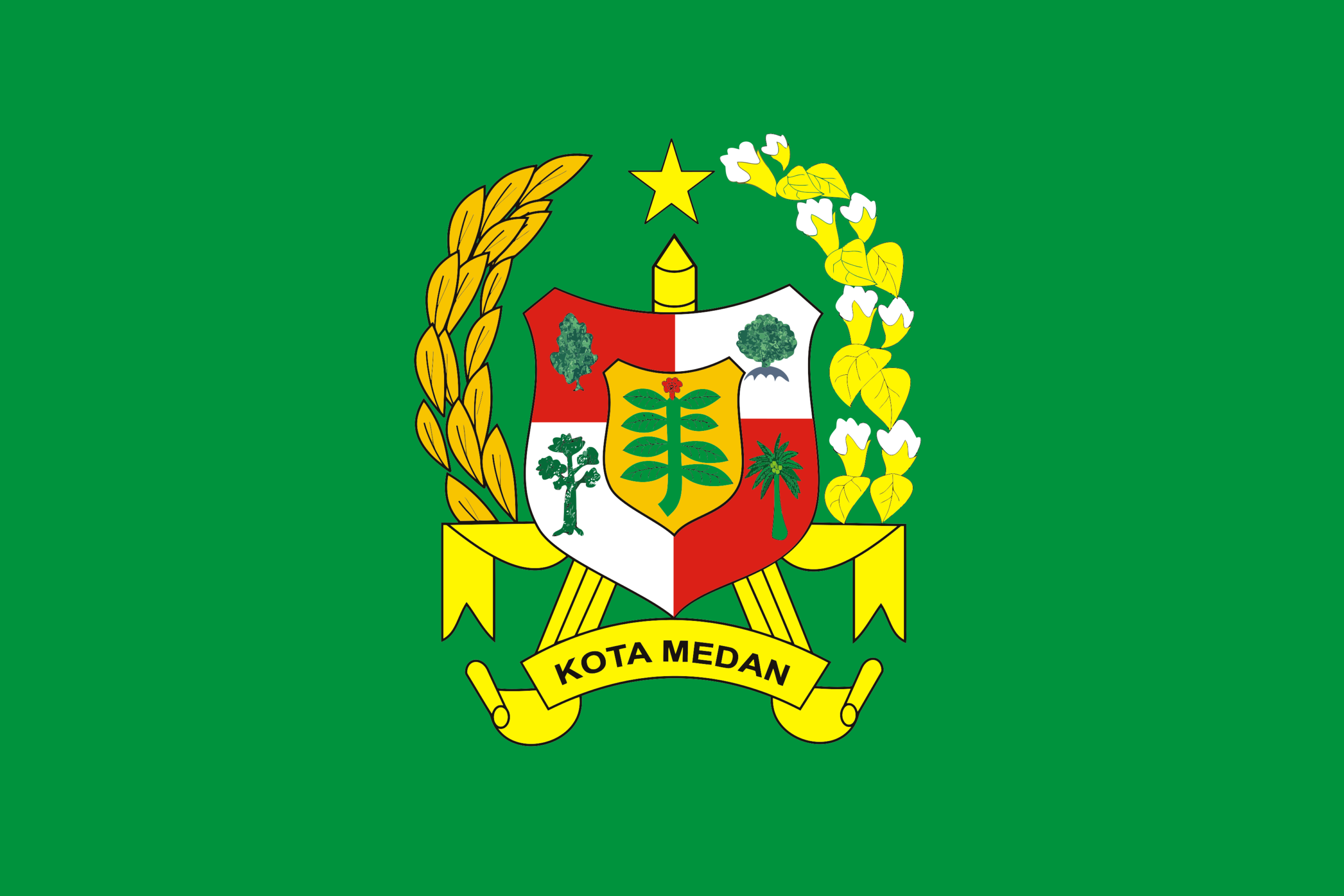

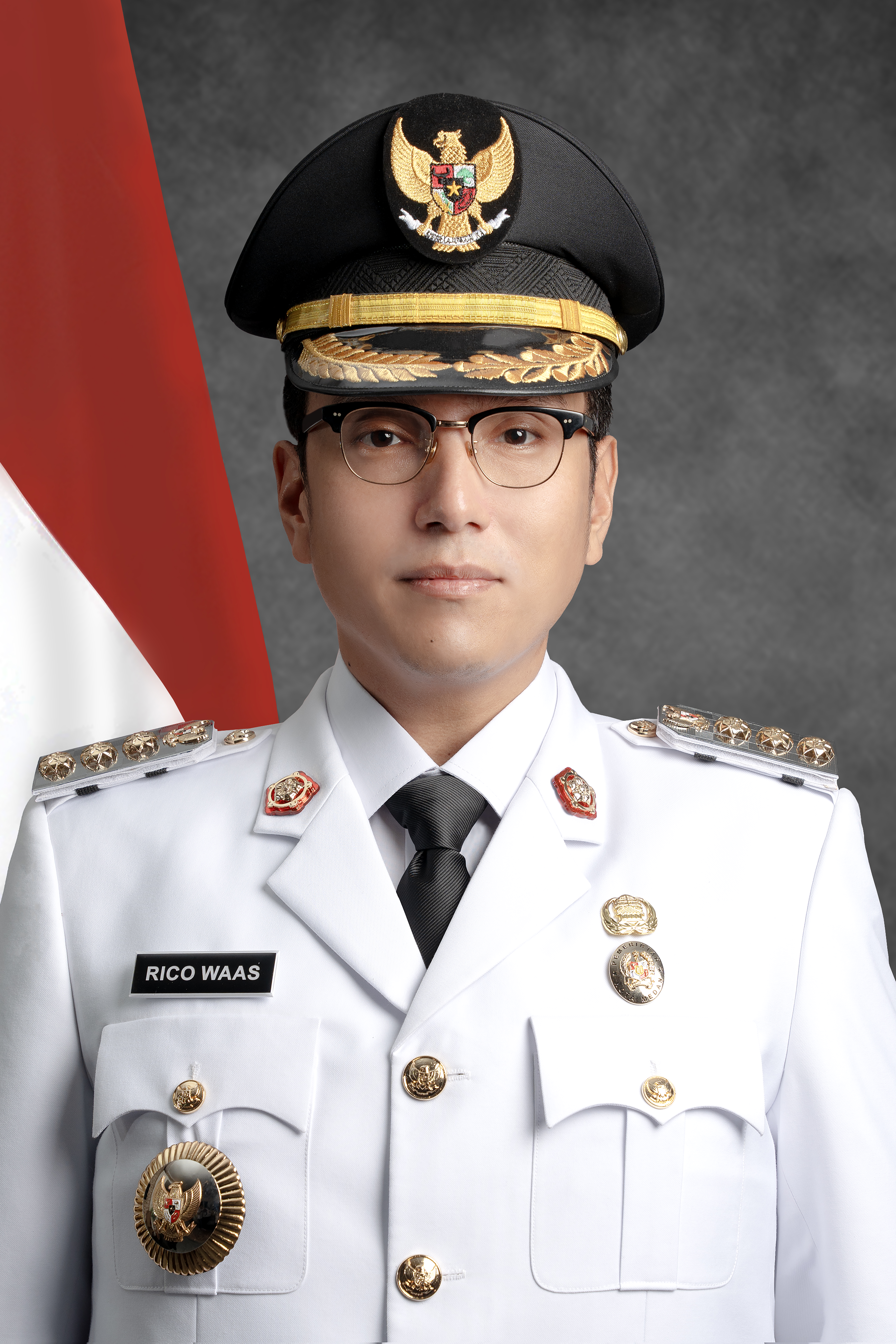
- Incumbent; Rico Waas since 20 February 2025
- Term length: 5 years
- Inaugural holder: Daniël Mackay
- Formation: May 1, 1918; 108 years ago
- Website: Official website

Medan, the capital of North Sumatra province, has a leadership structure that begins with the mayor. In 1918, the position of assistant resident, who previously led the Medan government, was finally changed to mayor. The first mayor was Daniël Mackay, of Dutch descent. Initially, a mayor could also serve as chairman of the city council, assisted by an assistant mayor elected by popular vote.

== List ==
The following is a definitive list of Mayors of Medan since 1918 during the Dutch East Indies era until now under the Government of the Republic of Indonesia.

Burgemeester van Medan
Num.	Mayor (Birth–Death)	Portrait	Party	Beginning	End	Length of service	Period	Deputy	Ref.
1	Daniël Mackay (1878–1962)		Non Party	1 May 1918	30 April 1931	12 years, 364 days	1 (1918)	J. A. Bartelds (1925–1926)	
2	J. M. Wesselink		Non Party	1 May 1931	30 April 1935	3 years, 364 days	2 (1931)	J. de Waard	
3	Gerrit Pitlo		Non Party	1 May 1935	30 April 1938	2 years, 364 days	3 (1935)	S. J. Schoorl	
4	Carl Erich Eberhard Kuntze (1896–1976)		Non Party	1 May 1938	14 February 1942	3 years, 289 days	4 (1938)	R. F. E. M. Romme (1938–1942)	
メダン市長
Num.	Mayor (Birth–Death)	Portrait	Party	Beginning	End	Length of service	Period	Deputy	Ref.
1	Shinichi Hayasaki (早崎 真)		Non Party	15 February 1942	16 August 1945	3 years, 182 days	5	There isn't any	
Mayor of Medan
Num.	Mayor (Birth–Death)	Portrait	Party	Beginning	End	Length of service	Period	Deputy	Ref.
1	Luat Siregar (1908–1953)		Independent	17 August 1945	10 November 1945	85 days	6	Unknown	
2	M. Yusuf		Non Party	10 November 1945	31 October 1947	1 year, 355 days	7	Unknown	
3	Djaidin Purba (1906–?)		Non Party	1 November 1947	11 July 1952	4 years, 253 days	8	Unknown	
4	A.M. Jalaludin		Non Party	12 July 1952	1 December 1954	2 years, 142 days	9	Unknown	
5	Muda Siregar (1900–?)		Non Party	2 December 1954	2 July 1958	3 years, 212 days	10	Unknown	
6	Madja Purba		Non Party	3 July 1958	27 February 1961	2 years, 239 days	11	Unknown	
7	Basyrah Lubis (1912–1985)		Non Party	28 February 1961	9 October 1964	3 years, 224 days	12	Unknown	
8	Roos Telaumbanua (1919–1987)		Parkindo	10 October 1964	27 August 1965	321 days	13	Unknown	
9	Aminurrasyid		Non Party	28 August 1965	26 September 1966	1 year, 29 days	14	Unknown	
10	Sjoerkani (1931–2007)		Non Party	26 September 1966	2 July 1974	7 years, 308 days	15	Unknown	
11	A.M. Saleh Arifin		ABRI–AD	3 July 1974	31 March 1980	5 years, 272 days	16	Unknown	
12	Agus Salim Rangkuti (1928–?)		ABRI–AD	1 April 1980	31 March 1990	9 years, 364 days	17	Unknown	
13	Bachtiar Djafar (1939–2021)		Golkar	1 April 1990	31 March 2000	9 years, 365 days	18	Unknown	
14	Abdillah (1955–)		Non Party	1 April 2000	31 March 2005	4 years, 364 days	19	Maulana Pohan	
14	Abdillah (1955–)		Non Party	1 April 2005	20 August 2008	3 years, 141 days	20	Ramli Lubis	
15	Rahudman Harahap (1959–)		Nasdem	26 July 2010	16 May 2013	2 years, 294 days	21	Dzulmi Eldin	(Note: Dismissed due to involvement in a corruption case.)
16	Dzulmi Eldin (1960–)		Golkar	18 June 2014	26 July 2015	1 year, 38 days	21	Vacant	
16	Dzulmi Eldin (1960–)		Golkar	17 February 2016	17 October 2019	3 years, 242 days	22 (2015)	Akhyar Nasution	
17	Akhyar Nasution (1966–)		Demokrat	11 February 2021	17 February 2021	6 days	22 (2015)	Vacant	
18	Bobby Nasution (1991–)		PDI-P (2020–2023)	26 February 2021	20 February 2025	3 years, 360 days	23 (2020)	Aulia Rachman	
18	Bobby Nasution (1991–)		Gerindra (since 2024)	26 February 2021	20 February 2025	3 years, 360 days	23 (2020)	Aulia Rachman	
19	Rico Waas (1986–)		Nasdem	20 February 2025	Incumbent	1 year, 199 days	24 (2024)	Zakiyuddin Harahap	

== Temporary replacement ==
In the government stack, a regional head who submits himself to leave or temporarily resigns from his position to the central government, then the Minister of Home Affairs prepares a replacement who is a bureaucrat in the regional government or even a deputy mayor, including when the mayor's position is in a transition period.

Portrait	Mayor	Party	Beginning	End	Duration	Period	Definitive	Ref.
	Afifuddin Lubis (1949–) (Acting)	Non Partisan	20 August 2008	22 July 2009	336 days	20 (2005)	Abdillah	(Note: Afifuddin replaced Abdillah who was temporarily dismissed because he was undergoing trial as a defendant in a corruption case involving misappropriation of Regional Revenue and Expenditure Budget funds and procurement of fire trucks at the Corruption Crimes Court)
	Rahudman Harahap (1959–) (Acting)	Non Partisan	23 July 2009	15 February 2010	207 days	20 (2005)	Abdillah	
	Syamsul Arifin (1952–2023) (Acting)	Non Partisan	16 February 2010	25 July 2010	159 days	20 (2005)	Abdillah	(Note: Acting official, concurrently holding his main position as Governor of North Sumatra)
	Dzulmi Eldin (1960–) (Acting)	Golkar	15 May 2013	17 June 2014	1 year, 33 days	21 (2010)	Rahudman Harahap	(Note: Acting Mayor, replacing Rahudman Harahap who was dismissed)
	Syaiful Bahri Lubis (Daily Executive)	Non Partisan	27 July 2015	5 October 2015	70 days	—	Transition (2015–2016)	(Note: As Acting Mayor of Medan)
	Randiman Tarigan (1956–) (Acting)	Non Partisan	5 October 2015	17 February 2016	135 days	—	Transition (2015–2016)	
	Akhyar Nasution (1966–) (Acting)	Demokrat	17 October 2019	11 February 2021	1 year, 117 days	22 (2015)	Dzulmi Eldin	
	Arief Sudarto Trinugroho (Acting official)	Non Partisan	26 September 2020	5 December 2020	70 days	22 (2015)	Akhyar Nasution	
	Wiriya Alrahman (1966–)(Daily Executive)	Non Partisan	17 February 2021	26 February 2021	9 days	—	Transition (2021)	
	Aulia Rachman (1978–) (Acting)	PSI	25 September 2024	23 November 2024	59 days	23 (2020)	Bobby Nasution	(Note: Mayor Bobby Nasution is on campaign leave for the 2024 North Sumatra gubernatorial election from 25 September 2024 to 23 November 2024, the position of mayor is temporarily held by Deputy Mayor Aulia Rachman)

== See also ==
- Medan
- List of incumbent regional heads and deputy regional heads in North Sumatra
