= Djanius Djamin =

Indonesian politician (born 1942)

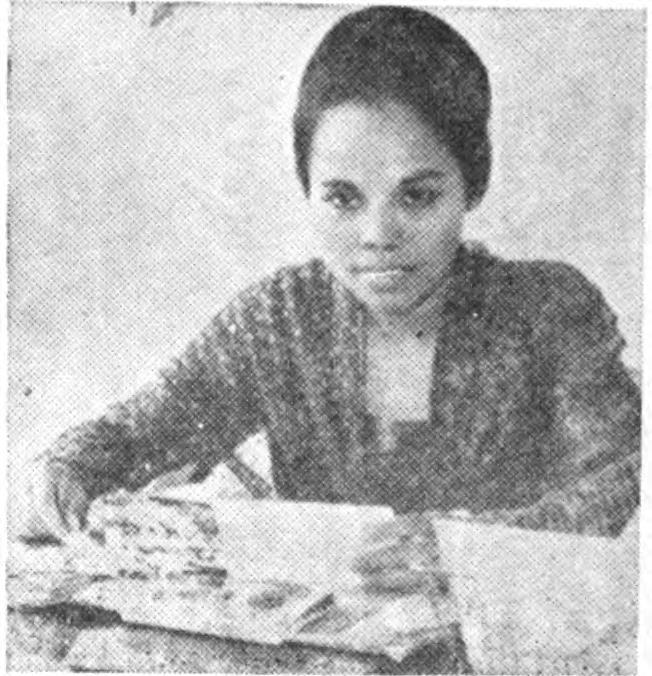
- Djamin as a legislator, c. 1970

Rector of the State University of Medan
- In office 31 December 1998 – 16 April 2007
- Preceded by: Darmono
- Succeeded by: Syawal Gultom

Speaker of the Medan City Regional House of Representatives
- In office 1969–1971
- Preceded by: M. Alwi St. Sinaro
- Succeeded by: Nas Sebayang

Member of the Medan City Regional House of Representatives
- In office 1969–1977

Personal details
- Born: 22 December 1942 (age 82); Tanah Datar, Japan-occupied Dutch East Indies
- Political party: Golkar

Djanius Djamin (born 22 December 1942) is an Indonesian academic and politician. She was the rector of the State University of Medan between 1998 and 2007, and chaired the Medan City Regional House of Representatives between 1969 and 1971.

== Early life and education ==
Djamin was born in the nagari (village) of Parambahan, near the town of Batusangkar in what is today Tanah Datar Regency of West Sumatra, on 22 December 1942. She had four brothers and one sister. His father was a merchant and they moved to Pekanbaru in Djamin's youth, and she began her education there. After graduating from middle school, she moved to Jakarta for high school but had to return to Pekanbaru before graduating due to her parents' illness. She graduated from high school in Pekanbaru, and proceeded to study law at the University of North Sumatra (USU), obtaining her bachelors in 1965. She was active in the Muslim Students' Association (HMI) during her studies in USU, becoming chairman of the university's HMI women wing. Following the 30 September movement, Djamin became a target for Indonesian Communist Party (PKI) sympathizers, and during one anti-PKI march she was stabbed in the stomach, but received no injuries as she wore a belt.

She would later obtain a master's degree in 1992 from the Bogor Agricultural Institute, and a doctorate from Universiti Sains Malaysia in 2005.

== Academia ==
After her graduation, she had job offers from a court, the prosecution service, the privately owned Indonesian National Trade Bank, and as a lecturer at IKIP Medan (Medan Teachers' Training College). She picked the latter two options after consulting her parents. She later also lectured at Jayabaya University, State Islamic University of North Sumatera, and the Sumatera Institute of Technology. In the 1970s, she became chancellor and chairman of the board of Medan's private National Banking Academy (Perbanas), which later became the economic institute STIE Tri Karya. In 1994, she was made a professor at IKIP Medan.

On 31 December 1998, Djamin was appointed as the rector of IKIP Medan, replacing Darmono. During her tenure, IKIP Medan was converted into a full university, the State University of Medan, and she remained as a rector for two terms until her replacement by Syawal Gultom on 16 April 2007. Afterwards, she briefly served as acting rector at the State Islamic University of North Sumatra during a leadership dispute within the university.

== Politics ==
In 1969, she became a legislator in the Medan City Regional House of Representatives, and became the council's speaker until 1971. She was the first woman to serve as the speaker of a regional legislative body in Sumatra. Her tenure as speaker coincided with the mayorship of Sjoerkani, who was also of Minangkabau descent. Djamin would be elected for a second term as a city councillor following the 1971 election, and served in the body until 1977. During this second term, she was part of a special committee investigating Medan's date of founding. The committee eventually settled on a founding date of 1 July 1590, based on the date of initial settlement, instead of the previously commemorated date of the city's chartering under the Dutch East Indies government.

She remained active in politics in later years, chairing North Sumatra's Minangkabau association. Djamin endorsed Akhyar Nasution's candidacy in the 2020 Medan mayoral election. As Nasution's running mate Salman Alfarisi was of Minangkabau descent, she called for Medan's Minangkabau population to support the ticket, decrying those who didn't as "traitors".

== Personal life and family ==
She was married to Syahbuddin Harahap, a fellow HMI member, in 1967. The couple had one son, Haikal Rahman. Djamin lived in the United States for one year when Harahap studied for a masters at the University of Massachusetts. Harahap died in 1991.
