= Family of Joko Widodo =

Family of the 7th President of Indonesia

- Political family
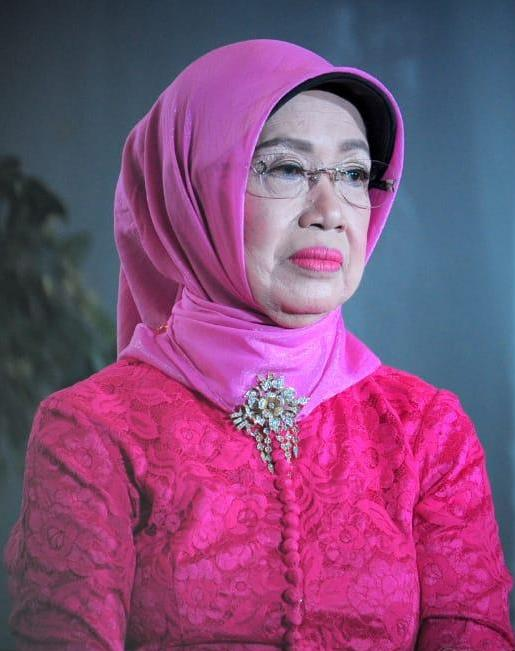
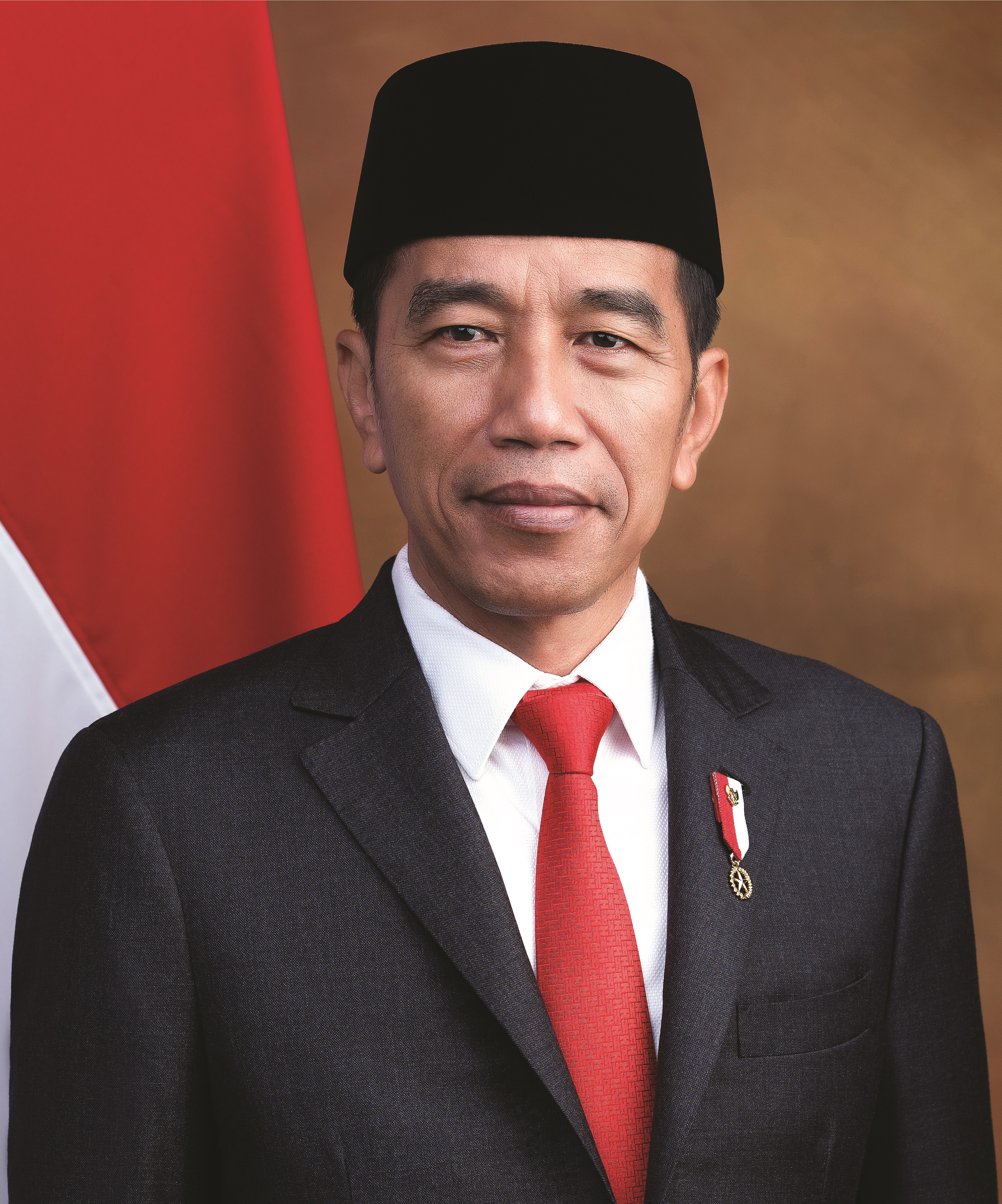
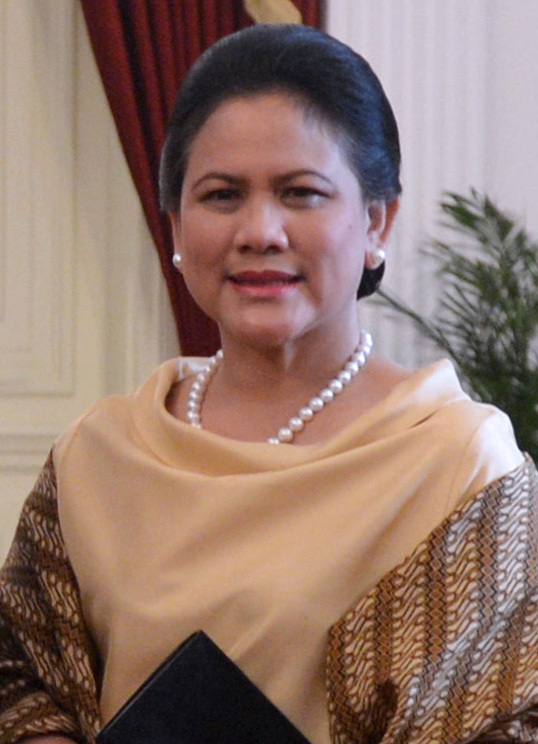
- From left to right: Jokowi's nuclear family; Sudjiatmi (mother of Jokowi, top left), Jokowi, Iriana, Gibran Rakabuming Raka, Kahiyang Ayu, and Kaesang Pangarep (bottom right).
- Country: Indonesia
- Origin: Surakarta
- Titles: List: President of Indonesia; First Lady of Indonesia; Vice President of Indonesia; Second Lady of Indonesia; Chief Justice of the Constitutional Court of Indonesia; Governor of Jakarta; First Lady of Jakarta; Governor of North Sumatra; First Lady of North Sumatra; Mayor of Medan; First Lady of Medan; Mayor of Surakarta; First Lady of Surakarta

The family of Joko Widodo (Jokowi), the 7th president of Indonesia, includes his wife, children, sons-in-law, siblings, parents, grandparents, uncles and aunts, as well as legally bound family relationships such as those arising after a valid marriage according to applicable law, such as in-laws and besan (affinals). In addition, there are some adoptive families that are created due to social and cultural relationships. Joko Widodo's immediate family is of Javanese descent.

== Immediate family ==
=== Wife ===
Iriana is the wife of Joko Widodo whom is the 7th First Lady of Indonesia. They married in Surakarta, Central Java on 24 December 1986, and have three children.

=== Children ===
==== Gibran Rakabuming Raka ====
Gibran Rakabuming Raka (born 1 October 1987) is the eldest son of Joko Widodo. He graduated from the Management Development Institute of Singapore in 2007 and then continued his studies at the University of Technology Sydney before graduating in 2010. He is the former mayor of Surakarta and the 14th vice president of Indonesia from 2024 to 2026.

==== Kahiyang Ayu ====
Kahiyang Ayu (born 20 April 1991) is Joko Widodo's second child and only daughter. She graduated from Sebelas Maret University on 17 December 2013. In 2019, she obtained a master's degree from the IPB University, together with her husband, Bobby Nasution is a former mayor of Medan and governor of North Sumatra, they got married in 2017. She successfully completed her master's degree in 23 months with a thesis entitled 'Analysis of Strategy and Competitiveness of Sugarcane Plantations (Case Study of PTPN X Surabaya)'.

Kahiyang and Bobby Nasution have three children. She gave birth to a daughter named Sedah Mirah Nasution on 1 August 2018. The second child was named Panembahan Al Nahyan Nasution (born in 2020), and the third child was named Panembahan Al Saud Nasution (born 2022).

==== Kaesang Pangarep ====
Kaesang Pangarep (born 25 December 1994) is Joko Widodo's younger son cum youngest child who currently serves as chairman of the Indonesian Solidarity Party. Since high school, Kaesang followed in the footsteps of his eldest brother Gibran to continue his education in Singapore. He graduated from the Anglo-Chinese School (International) in November 2014. He starred in the 2016 film Check the Store Next Door.

=== Children-in-law ===
==== Selvi Ananda ====
Selvi Ananda (born 9 January 1989) is Joko Widodo's elder daughter-in-law and the wife of Gibran. She is the daughter of Fransiska Sri Partini and Ignatius Didit Supriyadi. She is an alumna of the Sekolah Tinggi Ilmu Ekonomi AUB and was crowned the winner of the Putri Solo contest in 2009. She converted from Catholicism to Islam before marrying Gibran in 2015.

==== Bobby Nasution ====
Muhammad Bobby Afif Nasution (born 5 July 1990) is Joko Widodo's only son-in-law and the husband of Jokowi's second child cum only daughter, Kahiyang Ayu. He is an alumnus of Bogor Agricultural University majoring in agribusiness at the Faculty of Economics and Management and a descendant of Raja Gunung Baringin Nasution, Panyabungan Timur, Mandailing Natal.

On 25 September 2019, he officially graduated from Bogor Agricultural University with a ‘Satisfactory’ master's degree, together with his wife, Kahiyang Ayu. He is a former mayor of Medan and governor of North Sumatra.

==== Erina Gudono ====
Erina Sofia Gudono (born 11 December 1996) is Joko Widodo's younger daughter-in-law and the wife of Jokowi's youngest child cum younger son, Kaesang Pangarep. Born in Pennsylvania, United States, she is the third of four children who grew up in Yogyakarta. She was a finalist for Puteri Indonesia representing the Special Region of Yogyakarta and made it to the Top 11 of Puteri Indonesia 2022. She graduated with a bachelor's degree in Financial Management from Gadjah Mada University. After graduating from UGM, Erina continued her Master of Public Administration education at University of Pennsylvania, US. She married Kaesang Pangarep on 10 December 2022.

== Parents and grandparents ==
Jokowi's parents were Widjiatno Notomihardjo (30 December 1938 – 23 July 2000) and Sudjiatmi (15 February 1943 – 25 March 2020). Both were firstly mutual friends of age differences who later married. Sudjiatmi hailed from a family of Javanese farmers while Widjiatno Notomihardjo was the son of the lurah (village chief) of his home village of Kragan, in Karanganyar. Both lived difficult lives during their first few years of marriage, owing to their different socio-economic backgrounds (he came from a poor modest family whilst she came from a middle-class family) and were also school dropouts.

His paternal grandfather, Lamidi Wiryo Miharjo, was the village head of Kragan. He was known as Lurah Dongkol. Noto Mihardjo was the first child of Lamidi Wiryo Miharjo and Painem, in addition to his other siblings Wahyono, H. Mulyono Herlambang, Joko Sudarsono and Heru Purnomo. His mother, Sudjiatmi, was the daughter of a timber trader in Gumukrejo, Giriroto Village, Ngemplak Boyolali Subdistrict named Wirorejo and his partner Sani Wirorejo. Sani died on 23 October 2015 at the age of 102, after outliving her son-in-law, Widjiatno, Jokowi's father who is also the husband of her daughter, Sudjiatmi for 15 years since 2000.

== Siblings and extended family ==
Jokowi has three younger sisters, namely Iit Sriyantini, Titik Relawati and Idayati, the wife of Anwar Usman is a former chief justice of the Constitutional Court of Indonesia. He actually had a younger brother named Joko Lukito, but he died during labour.

One of Jokowi's paternal uncles was Mulyono Herlambang, the only presumed known brother of his father, for his paternal grandfather, Lamidi Wirjo Mihardjo (Widjiatno's father) was married thrice and had many children. He died in Jeddah, Saudi Arabia on 2 January 2019 while performing the Umrah pilgrimage. Jokowi also has two maternal uncles through his mother named Miyono Suryasardjono (born 1940), his mother's elder brother 3 years her senior who died at the Slamet Riyadi TNI AD Hospital on 28 February 2022, aged 82 and also Setiawan Prasteyo (born 1948), who is 8 years her junior as well as her sole living younger brother.

== In-laws/affinals ==
=== Jokowi's affinals (Gibran's in-laws, Selvi Ananda's parents) ===
Ignatius Didit Supriyadi and Fransiska Sri Partini are the in-laws of Gibran, Selvi's parents. Selvi's Catholic parents run a sambal belut food stall in Solo. Ignatius Didit Supriyadi died on 3 April 2018. Dita Andini is Selvi Ananda's sister and daughter of Didit and Partini. She is married to Dendy Purbowo and has a child named Saafia Azni Purbowo.

=== Jokowi's affinals (Kahiyang's in-laws, Bobby Nasution's parents) ===
Erwin Nasution and Ade Hanifah Siregar are Kahiyang's in-laws, Bobby's parents. Erwin served as the president director of PT Perkebunan Nusantara (Persero).

Poppy Dewinta is Bobby's older sister and the eldest daughter of Erwin and Ade. Inge Amelia is Bobby's older sister, Poppy's younger sister and the second daughter of Erwin and Ade. She joined the NasDem Party and is the youngest DPRD member in North Sumatra for the 2014-2017 period.

Benny Sinomba Siregar is Bobby's uncle from his mother's side. He first served as the head of the Education and Culture Department of the City of Medan and then became the Daily Executive (Plh) of the District Secretary (Sekda) of Medan.

=== Jokowi's affinals (Kaesang's in-laws, Erina Gudono's parents) ===
Mohammad Gudono and Sofiatun Gudono are the in-laws of Kaesang, Erina's parents. Mohamad Gudono was a lecturer at the Faculty of Economics and Business, Gajah Mada University in the Department of Accounting. Born in Semarang on 26 May 1963, Mohamad Gudono died on Friday, 22 July 2016 at RSCM Central Jakarta due to a heart attack. Sofiatun Gudono was also a lecturer and majored in Management during college. She was a lecturer as well as the rector of one of the renowned universities, Sekolah Tinggi Ilmu Ekonomi (STIE) Mitra Indonesia. She is also famous as an entrepreneur and a boutique business called Sophie Boutique which is famous in Yogyakarta and abroad.

Erina Gudono also has an older brother named Allen Gudono who is her marriage guardian or Wali as their father passed before Erina's marriage, an older sister named Nadia Gudono and a younger sister named Shania Gudono.

=== Brothers-in-law ===
Hari Mulyono was the husband of Idayati, Joko Widodo's sister. He had two children, Septiara Silvani Putri and Adityo Rimbo Galih Samudra, and a son-in-law, Joko Priyambodo (Septiara's husband). He died on 24 September 2018 at the age of 58. On 26 May 2022, Idayati remarried to Chief Justice of the Constitutional Court, Anwar Usman.

Arif Budi Sulistyo is the husband of Titik Relawati, Joko Widodo's youngest sister. One of his sons, Bagaskara Ikhlasulla Arif, is the Non-Government Relations Manager at PT Pertamina (Persero), having previously served at PT Bank Rakyat Indonesia, and is married to Ima Qoyyimah.

=== In-laws from Jokowi's wife (Iriana's brothers) ===
Haryanto or Anto is the older brother of Iriana, Joko Widodo's wife. He reportedly works as a sports teacher at SMPN 10 Surakarta after previously being transferred from SMPN 19 Surakarta in 2015 due to the teacher zoning system. Haryanto has a son named Rio Nur Desnanto who had funded the paving of the connecting road between Banyuanyar, Solo City and Colomadu District, Karanganyar Regency, Central Java with Rp 600 million.

Arif Budi Sulistyo is Iriana's younger brother. In 2017, he was involved in a tax office bribery case.

Wahyu Purwanto is also Iriana's younger brother. In 2020, he withdrew from the 2020 Gunungkidul regency leadership elections. He is also a cadre of the NasDem Party.

== Adoptive parents ==
Selimah Inem Thursina was Jokowi's adoptive mother when Jokowi worked at PT Kertas Kraft Aceh from 1986 to 1988 and lived in Bale Atu village, Bener Meriah Regency, Aceh. On 16 February 2019, Selimah (born 1951) died at the age of 68 at Datu Beru Hospital in the Takengon municipality due to liver cancer.

Nurdin (born 1946) is the husband cum widower of Selimah Inem Thursina (1951–2019), Jokowi's adoptive mother while he was in Aceh, he is now not only a father of 5 children (2 biological sons and 3 biological daughters) with several grandchildren from each of their biological children but through their only adopted son, Jokowi, Nurdin is also the adoptive grandfather cum adoptive great-grandfather, for his late wife is the adoptive grandmother cum adoptive great-grandmother to Jokowi's 3 children and their respective spouses (Gibran and his wife, Selvi, Kahiyang and her husband, Bobby Nasution as well as Kaesang and his wife, Erina Gudono) and also each set of children from the marriages of their adopted grandson, Gibran Rakabuming and their adopted granddaughter, Kahiyang Ayu respectively (Jokowi's three grandsons and two granddaughters).
