= 2024 Medan mayoral election =

- 27 November 2024
- Turnout: 34.81%
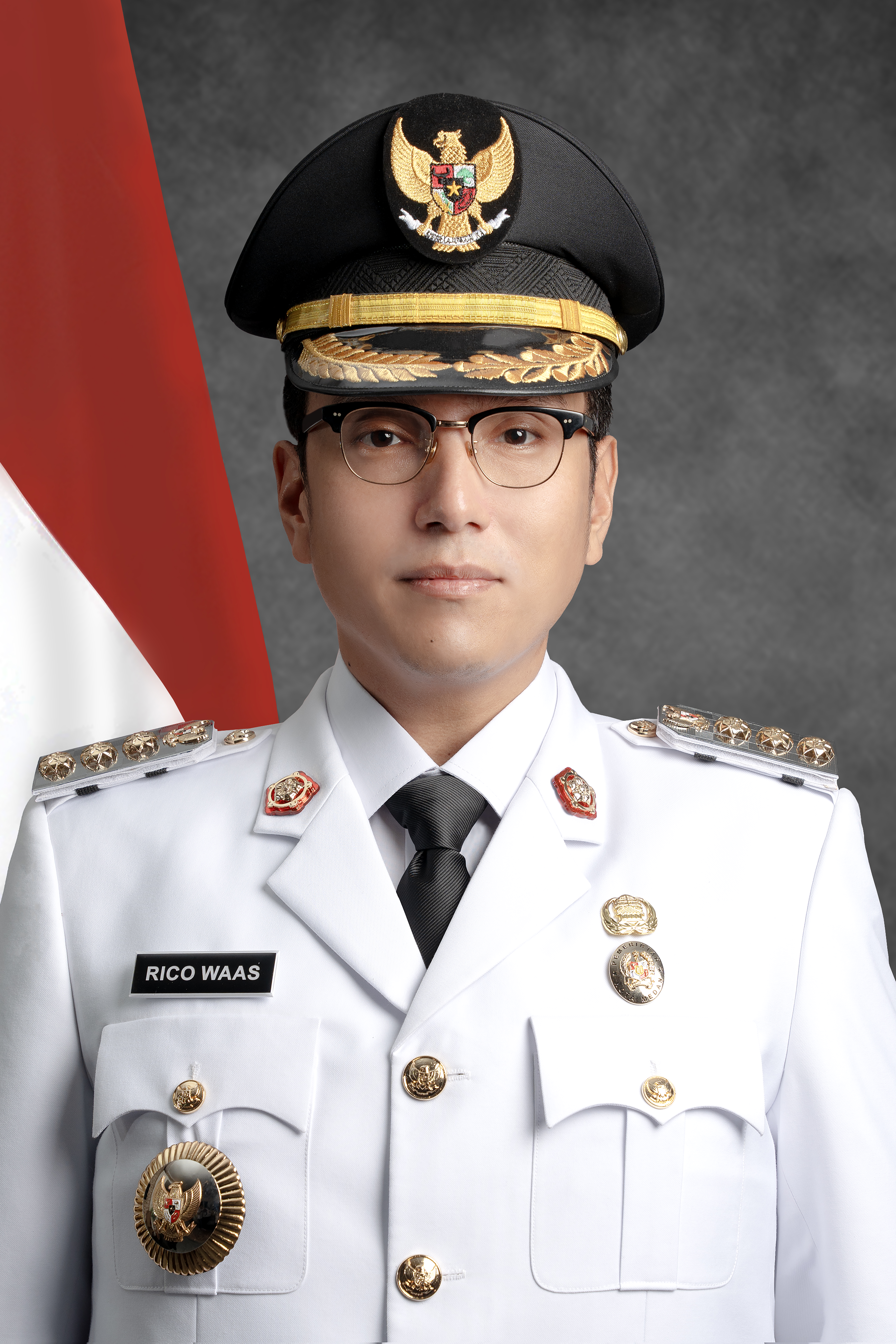

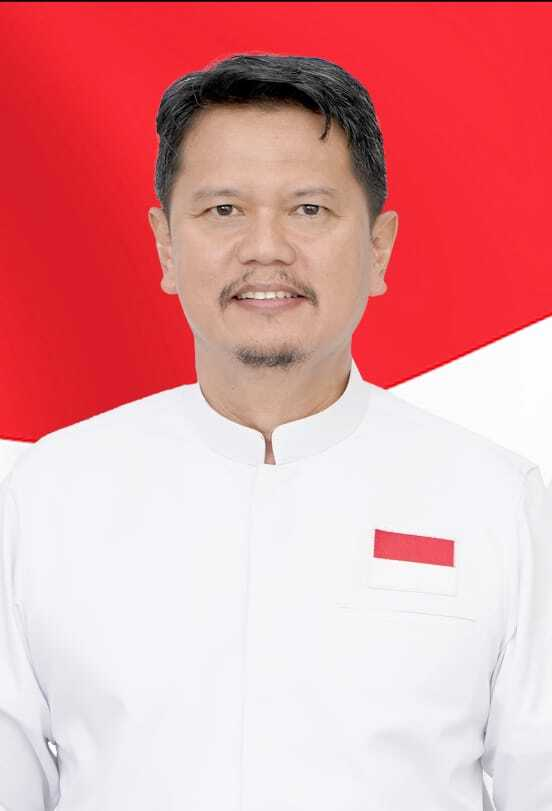

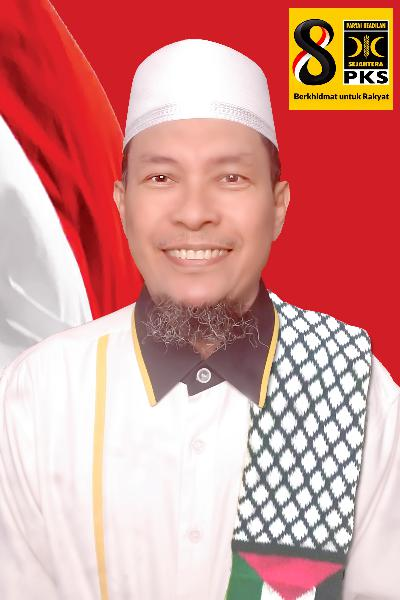
Candidate	Rico Waas	Ridha Dharmajaya	Hidayatullah
Party	NasDem	PDI-P	PKS
Running mate	Zakiyuddin Harahap	Abdul Rani	Ahmad Yasir Ridho Lubis
Popular vote	297,498	190,344	115,903
Percentage	49.28%	31.53%	19.20%
Mayor before election
Bobby Nasution
Gerindra
Elected mayor
Rico Waas
NasDem

The 2024 Medan mayoral election was held on 27 November 2024 as part of Indonesian nationwide local elections to elect the mayor and vice mayor of Medan for a five-year term. The election was won by Rico Waas of the NasDem Party with 49% of the vote. Ridha Dharmajaya of the Indonesian Democratic Party of Struggle (PDI-P) placed second with 31%, followed by former member of the House of Representatives, Hidayatullah of the Prosperous Justice Party (PKS), who received 19%.

== Electoral system ==
The election, like other local elections in 2024, follow the first-past-the-post system where the candidate with the most votes wins the election, even if they do not win a majority. It is possible for a candidate to run uncontested, in which case the candidate is still required to win a majority of votes "against" an "empty box" option. Should the candidate fail to do so, the election will be repeated on a later date.

== Candidates ==
According to electoral regulations, in order to qualify for the election, candidates were required to secure support from 10 seats in the Medan City Regional House of Representatives (DPRD). None of the parties won 10 or more seats in the DPRD in the 2024 election, and so coalitions of multiple parties are required to nominate a candidate. Candidates may alternatively demonstrate support in form of photocopies of identity cards, which in Medan's case corresponds to 120,475 copies. No such candidates registered with the General Elections Commission by the provided deadline.

=== Potential ===
The following are individuals who have either been publicly mentioned as a potential candidate by a political party in the DPRD, publicly declared their candidacy with press coverage, or considered as a potential candidate by press:

- Aulia Agsa (NasDem), member of North Sumatra Regional House of Representatives.
- Aulia Rachman (Gerindra), incumbent vice mayor.
- Bakhtiar Ahmad Sibarani (NasDem), former regent of Central Tapanuli.
- Dahnil Anzar Simanjutnak (Gerindra), former chairman of the Muhammadiyah Youth (2014-2018) and spokesman to president-elect Prabowo Subianto.
- El Adrian Shah (Hanura), party chairman of Hanura North Sumatran branch.
- Hidayatullah (PKS), member of the House of Representatives.
- Ihwan Ritonga (Gerindra), Deputy Speaker of the Medan City Regional House of Representatives (2019-2024).
- Once Mekel (PDI-P), musician.
- Rahmansyah Sibarani (NasDem), Deputy Speaker of the North Sumatra Regional House of Representatives (2019-2024).
- Rahudman Harahap (NasDem), former mayor of Medan (2010-2015).
- Rico Waas (NasDem), nephew of NasDem Party Chairman Surya Paloh.
- Ridha Dharmajaya, University of North Sumatra Faculty of Medicine Professor.
- Rudy Hermanto (PDI-P), member of the North Sumatra Regional House of Representatives.
- Sobirin Harahap, entrepreneur.

=== Declined ===
The following are individuals who are considered as potential candidates, but publicly declined to run or ran for another elected office:

- Benny Sinomba Siregar, acting Secretary of Medan and uncle of Bobby Nasution.
- Bobby Nasution (Gerindra), incumbent mayor.

== Political map ==
Following the 2024 Indonesian general election, eleven political parties are represented in the Medan City Regional House of Representatives:

Political parties	Seat count
Indonesian Democratic Party of Struggle (PDI-P)	9 / 50
Prosperous Justice Party (PKS)	8 / 50
Party of Functional Groups (Golkar)	6 / 50
Great Indonesia Movement Party (Gerindra)	6 / 50
NasDem Party	5 / 50
Democratic Party (Demokrat)	4 / 50
Indonesian Solidarity Party (PSI)	4 / 50
National Mandate Party (PAN)	3 / 50
National Awakening Party (PKB)	2 / 50
People's Conscience Party (Hanura)	2 / 50
Perindo Party	1 / 50

== Results ==
Candidate	Running mate	Party	Votes	%
Rico Waas	Zakiyuddin Harahap	NasDem Party	297,498	49.28
Ridha Dharmajaya	Abdul Rani	Indonesian Democratic Party of Struggle	190,344	31.53
Hidayatullah	Ahmad Yasir Ridho Lubis	Prosperous Justice Party	115,903	19.20
Total			603,745	100.00
Valid votes			603,745	96.40
Invalid/blank votes			22,564	3.60
Total votes			626,309	100.00
Registered voters/turnout			1,799,421	34.81
Source: KPU
