= Medan City Regional House of Representatives =

Municipal legislature of the city of Medan, North Sumatra, Indonesia

Medan City Regional House of Representatives Dewan Perwakilan Rakyat Daerah Kota Medan
- 2024–2029 period

Type
- Type: Unicameral

Leadership
- Speaker: Wong Chun Sen Tarigan, PDI-P since 25 November 2024
- Deputy Speaker: Rajuddin Sagala, PKS since 25 November 2024
- Deputy Speaker: Zulkarnaen, Gerindra since 25 November 2024
- Deputy Speaker: Hadi Suhendra, Golkar since 25 November 2024

Structure
- Seats: 50
- Political groups: Government (39): PKS (8); Gerindra (6); Golkar (6); NasDem (5); Democratic (4); PSI (4); PAN (3); PKB (2); Perindo (1); Opposition (12): PDI-P (9); Hanura (2)

Elections
- Voting system: Open list
- Last general election: 14 February 2024
- Next general election: 2029

Website
- dprd.pemkomedan.go.id

The Medan City Regional House of Representatives (Indonesian: Dewan Perwakilan Rakyat Daerah Kota Medan) is the unicameral municipal legislature of the city of Medan, North Sumatra, Indonesia. It has 50 members, who are elected every five years, simultaneously with the national legislative election.

== History ==
During the late 19th century, Medan developed as an important economic center in the Sumatra's east coast, rapidly changing the settlement from a village into an urban agglomeration. In order to facilitate public works, the Dutch East Indies government formed a Negorijraad, a council funded through a land grant from the Sultan of Deli. When Medan was granted city status (Gemeente) on 1 April 1909, a city council (Gemeenterad) was created to supersede the Negorijraad. It was first headed by the assistant to the Resident of East Sumatra, until a mayor of Medan was elected in 1918. Initially, the legislature had 15 members – 12 Europeans, 2 Native Indonesians, and one representative of other Asian groups. By 1929, the council's membership had increased to 17, with 10 Europeans, 5 natives, and 2 representatives of other Asians. The city council was disbanded following the Japanese invasion of the Dutch East Indies.

Medan would lack a city council throughout the Indonesian National Revolution and further until 1957, when a Transitional Regional House of Representatives (Dewan Perwakilan Rakyat Daerah Peralihan/DPRDA) was established on 8 January 1957. When it was formed, the DPRDA had 25 members representing nine political parties. The Masyumi Party, with 11 members, was the largest party within Medan's DPRDA. The size of the legislature would be increased to 40 members by the time of the 1971 election in the New Order era. The speaker of the legislature between 1969–1971, Djanius Djamin, was the first woman to chair a regional legislature in Sumatra.

The body was first based in the Medan City Hall, with the building initially intended for use by De Javasche Bank before its purchase by the city council. The current legislative building was inaugurated in 2014.

== Composition ==
As of the 2024 election, the council has 50 elected members, with 5 electoral districts. The current speaker is Wong Chun Sen Tarigan of the Indonesian Democratic Party of Struggle, holding the position since 25 November 2024.

Legislative period	PDI-P	Gerindra	PKS	PAN	Golkar	PD	Nasdem	Hanura	PSI	Perindo	PPP	PKPI	PBB	Total
2014–2019	9	6	5	4	7	5	2	4			5	2	1	50
2019–2024	10	10	7	6	4	4	4	2	2	–	1	–	–	50
2024–2029	9	6	8	3	6	4	5	2	4	1	–		–	50

== Constituencies ==
In the 2024 election, the Medan City Regional House of Representatives was divided into 5 electoral districts (dapil) as follows:

Constituency	Districts included	No. of seats
1st	Medan Helvetia, Medan Barat, Medan Baru, Medan Petisah	7
2nd	Medan Belawan, Medan Marelan, Medan Labuhan	9
3rd	Medan Deli, Medan Tembung, Medan Perjuangan, Medan Timur	12
4th	Medan Kota, Medan Denai, Medan Amplas, Medan Area	10
5th	Medan Sunggal, Medan Tuntungan, Medan Johor, Medan Maimun, Medan Polonia, Medan Selayang	12
TOTAL		50

== See also ==
- Regional House of Representatives
- North Sumatra Regional House of Representatives
