= Abdillah (Indonesian politician) =

Indonesian politician; Mayor of Medan

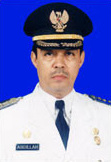
- Abdillah in 2005

Mayor of Medan
- In office 18 April 2000 – 2008
- Preceded by: Bachtiar Djafar
- Succeeded by: Afifuddin Lubis (acting); Rahudman Harahap

Personal details
- Born: 19 May 1955 (age 70) Medan, North Sumatra, Indonesia

Abdillah (born 19 May 1955) is an Indonesian politician who served as the mayor of Medan, North Sumatra, between 2000 and 2008. His second term was cut short when he was arrested and imprisoned in a corruption case.

== Biography ==
Abdillah was born in Medan on 19 May 1955. He was a businessman active in the construction industry and was also part of the construction industry association (GAPENSI) in North Sumatra.

In March 2000, Abdillah ran for mayor of Medan, supported by a coalition of parties led by Golkar. He also managed to secure the support of a number of PDI-P councillors in the city legislature despite running against Indonesian Democratic Party of Struggle (PDI-P) backed candidate Ridwan Batubara. He was sworn in on 18 April 2000 in an "abrupt and secretive" ceremony, due to the controversy surrounding accusations of bribery to councillors to vote for him. The city hall at the time of the ceremony was guarded by three platoons of riot police and several hundred paramilitary and private security guards.

During his service as mayor, Abdillah was known for attracting investors to develop large shopping centers and luxury hotels, while also establishing lighting-based art projects. He was awarded the nobility title of Datuk by the local Malay community in January 2005 and secured reelection in the same year against his former deputy Maulana Pohan.

In January 2008, Abdillah along with his deputy Ramli were arrested by the Corruption Eradication Commission under charges of using municipal funds for personal use and for graft related to the purchase of firetrucks. On 22 September 2008, Abdillah was sentenced to five years in prison by the Jakarta Corruption Court. Following an appeal to the Supreme Court of Indonesia, his sentence was reduced to four years in 2009. He was released from prison after two-thirds of his sentence due to good behavior in 2010.

He ran as a senatorial candidate in the 2019 Indonesian legislative election, and later joined the successful mayoral campaign of Bobby Nasution in Medan's 2020 election. He initially registered to run as a senatorial candidate for 2024, but withdrew his candidacy in 2023. He instead unsuccessfully ran for a seat in the House of Representatives representing North Sumatra's 1st district.

== Family ==
He is married to Nanan Farach Duna Abdillah. One of his children, Afif Abdillah, was elected city councillor for Medan in 2019.
