= Rangkuti =

Batak surname originating in Indonesia

Rangkuti is one of Mandailing Batak clans originating in North Sumatra, Indonesia. People of this clan bear the clan's name as their surname. Notable people of this clan include:

- Agus Salim Rangkuti (1928-?), Indonesian politician
- Hamsad Rangkuti (1943-2018), Indonesian writer
