= Aminurrasjid =

Indonesian politician

Mayor of Medan
- In office 28 August 1965 – 26 September 1966
- Governor: Roos Telaumbanua
- Preceded by: Roos Telaumbanua
- Succeeded by: Sjoerkani

Personal details
- Political party: Nahdlatul Ulama

Aminurrasjid was an Indonesian politician from the Nahdlatul Ulama party. He served as the mayor of Medan between 1965 and his removal in 1966.

== Career ==
He was the secretary general of the Nahdlatul Ulama's North Sumatra chapter during the 1960s. On 28 August 1965, Aminurrasjid became the Mayor of Medan, North Sumatra. His inauguration was marred with protests from the League of Supporters of Indonesian Independence and Pancasila Youth, who demanded the inauguration be cancelled and that the city council should be dissolved. The protests were heavily censured by local newspapers. The Duta Masyarakat newspaper described it as an "anti-democracy, anti-Republic, and anti-Sukarno" protest, while Harian Harapan described the protesters as "subversive, counterrevolutionary reactionaries" who had shown their "real selves by dirty reactionary and sadistic behavior and shouting".

About a month after his inauguration, the 30 September Movement occurred. Members of the Communist Party of Indonesia as well as those who were accused of involvement were investigated and arrested. He oversaw the suspension of several officials in his office who was allegedly involved in the movement. When the communist party was dissolved, Aminurrasjid urged all residents to hold prayers in gratitude of the dissolution.

The 30 September Movement, which resulted in widespread political turmoil, also cause rapid price inflation. In early April 1966, Aminurrasjid attempted to held a low price week in order to attract people to buy common goods. However, the week was closed after only four days. Aminurrasjid then attempted to lower prices of essential commodities under the assurance of continuous supply of goods, but it was cancelled less than a week after it was implemented.

In May 1966, Aminurrasjid—in his capacity as the managing director of the State Palm Oil Processing Plant at Pulau Brajan—was investigated by the provincial authorities under allegations of irregularities. He was dismissed from his mayoral office on 26 September. The acting governor of North Sumatra, Roos Telaumbanua, announced in early October that Aminurrasjid was indicated to have been involved in the 30 September Movement.
