= Abdillah =

Abdillah is a surname. Notable people with the surname include:

- Abdillah (Indonesian politician), mayor of Medan
- Datu Patinggi Abang Haji Abdillah (1862–1946), Sarawak patriot
- Haudi Abdillah (born 1993), Indonesian footballer
- Jamal Abdillah (born 1959), Malaysian singer and actor
- Puja Abdillah (born 1996), Indonesian footballer

== See also ==
- Abdullah (name)
