= Rico Waas =

Indonesian businessman and politician

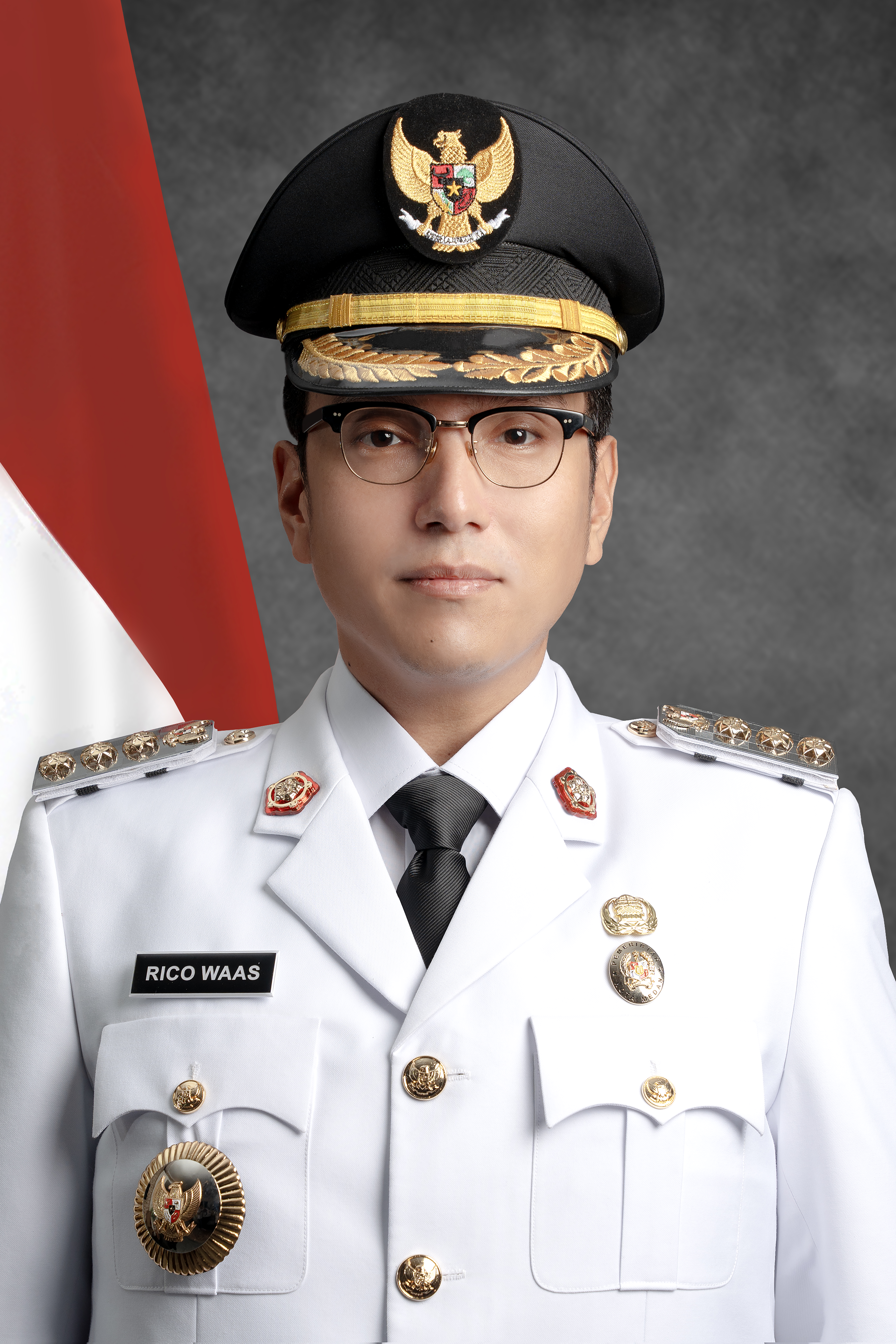
- Official portrait, 2025

19th Mayor of Medan
- Incumbent
- Assumed office 20 February 2025
- Governor: Bobby Nasution
- Deputy: Zakiyuddin Harahap
- Preceded by: Bobby Nasution

Personal details
- Born: Rico Tri Putra Bayu Waas; 5 July 1986 (age 40) Medan, Indonesia
- Party: NasDem (2011–present)
- Relations: Surya Paloh (uncle); Yoseano Waas (uncle)
- Education: Trisakti Academy of Graphic Technology; Bina Nusantara University

Rico Tri Putra Bayu Waas (born 5 July 1986) is an Indonesian politician of the Nasdem Party. He has served as the mayor of Medan in North Sumatra since 20 February 2025. He is the nephew of Surya Paloh, a conglomerate and Nasdem's chairman.

== Early life ==
Rico Waas was born in Medan on 5 July 1986. His father was Johnny Waas, and his grandfather Jacob Waas fought under Djamin Ginting during the Indonesian National Revolution. The Waas are of Karo descent. Rico's mother is Ida Paloh Waas, and his uncle is business tycoon and Nasdem Party chairman Surya Paloh. Rico studied in public schools in Medan, graduating from Medan's State High School No. 2 (SMA Negeri 2 Medan) before taking a diploma in graphic design and later a bachelor's in visual communication design at Bina Nusantara University.

== Career ==
After receiving his bachelor's, Rico worked as a graphic designer, including for Nasdem which he joined as a member in 2011. He founded a wedding organizer firm in 2018. In the 2024 legislative election, he ran as a Nasdem candidate for a seat in the North Sumatra Regional House of Representatives, but failed to win a seat after securing 8,938 votes.

=== Mayor of Medan ===
In the 2024 Medan mayoral election, Rico managed to secure his run as mayor with the endorsement of eight parties: Nasdem, Golkar, Gerindra, Demokrat, PKB, PAN, PSI, and Perindo. Zakiyudin Harahap was his running mate. Notably, Demokrat and PSI had previously endorsed incumbent vice mayor Aulia Rachman before switching to Rico last minute, while the Prosperous Justice Party (PKS) cancelled their endorsement of Rico. In the election, Rico and Harahap won 297,498 votes (49.3%), defeating two other candidates. Rico and Harahap were sworn in on 20 February 2025.

Medan (along with much of Aceh and North Sumatra provinces) was flooded in November 2025 as a consequence of Cyclone Senyar, resulting in around 85 thousand residents impacted in Medan. Rico organized large-scale evacuations and the reestablishment of logistics networks during the flooding. City legislators from PKS later criticized Rico's response to the flooding, accusing him of being unprepared and blaming him for the severity of the floods in Medan (13 people were killed in the city). The Medan region had previously received a Rp 1.5 trillion (~USD 90 million) grant from the World Bank for flood prevention, although Rico stated that the city government had no say in the fund's usage and focused on acquiring land for the fund's projects.

During the Ramadan month of 2026, Rico issued a circular which prohibited the sale of non-halal meat (largely pork) in Medan outside of permanent kiosks and designated market areas. This decision received heavy criticism due to it disproportionately impacting Christian Batak merchants in the city, and on 26 February around 1,000 people (including Muslims) protested the circular. Rico admitted wrongdoing and backtracked on the circular within days of the protest, allowing regular pork sales to resume.

== Personal life ==
Rico is married to Airin Rico Waas, and the couple has one children.
