= 2020 Medan mayoral election =

Local election in Indonesia

- 9 December 2020
- Registered: 1,601,001
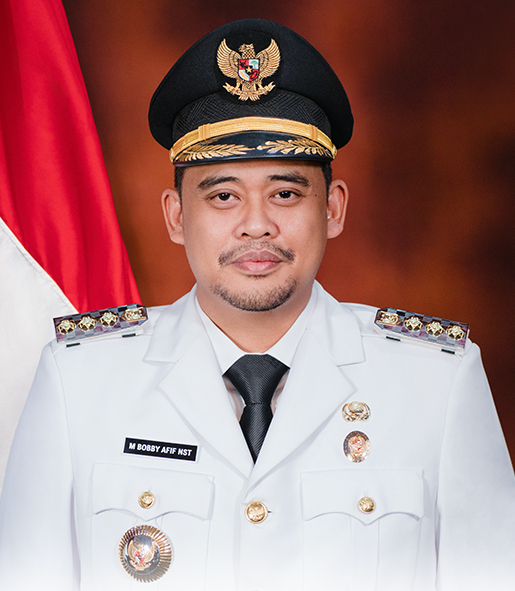

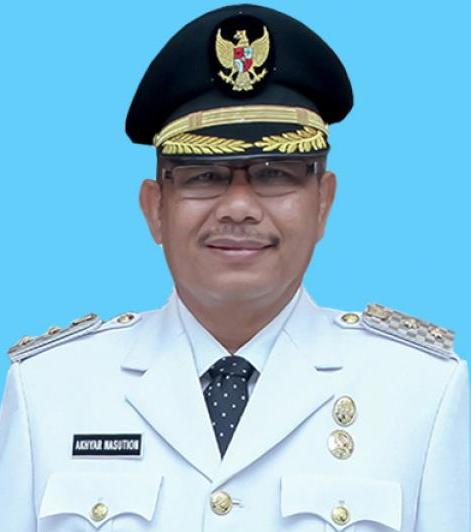
Nominee	Bobby Nasution	Akhyar Nasution
Party	PDI-P	Demokrat
Running mate	Aulia Rachman	Salman Alfarisi
Popular vote	393,533	342,580
Percentage	53.5%	46.5%
Mayor before election
Akhyar Nasution
Demokrat
Elected mayor
Bobby Nasution
PDI-P

The 2020 Medan mayoral election was held on 9 December 2020, as part of the 2020 simultaneous local elections in Indonesia. The mayoral election was contested between sitting acting mayor Akhyar Nasution and Bobby Nasution, son-in-law of President Joko Widodo.

== Background ==
The political landscape leading into the 2020 mayoral race was significantly disrupted by the arrest of the previously elected mayor, Dzulmi Eldin, who was apprehended by the Corruption Eradication Commission on bribery and graft charges in October 2019. Following Eldin's suspension, deputy mayor Akhyar Nasution assumed office as the acting mayor of Medan. The vacancy forced a realignment of local political coalitions ahead of the simultaneous municipal cycles. Tension within the ruling Indonesian Democratic Party of Struggle (PDI-P) mounted when the party executive leadership bypassed Akhyar, a longtime party member, to nominate Bobby Nasution, a property businessman and the son-in-law of Indonesian President Joko Widodo. In response, Akhyar defected from PDI-P to secure a nomination through alternative party alignments.

== Candidates and endorsements ==
The election narrowed into a head-to-head contest between two distinct political coalitions. Bobby Nasution secured a massive super-coalition encompassing the PDI-P, Gerindra, the National Mandate Party (PAN), Golkar, the Nasdem Party, the Indonesian Solidarity Party (PSI), Hanura, and the United Development Party (PPP). Running alongside city councillor Aulia Rachman of Gerindra, Bobby capitalized heavily on high-profile national party endorsements and political proximity to the presidential administration.

In contrast, acting mayor Akhyar Nasution formed a smaller opposition coalition backed strictly by the Democratic Party (Demokrat) and the Prosperous Justice Party (PKS). Akhyar selected provincial legislator Salman Alfarisi as his running mate, anchoring his campaign on local administrative experience and appealing to traditional regional voting blocs to counter the multi-party establishment alignment.

== Campaign and public debates ==
The campaign cycle relied heavily on decentralized media and televised debates due to structural restrictions imposed by the COVID-19 pandemic in Indonesia. The General Elections Commission organized two rounds of official public debates held on 7 November and 21 November 2020. During the initial debate, Akhyar focused heavily on his incumbent experience and continuity in municipal governance, which generated significant traction across local social media networks.

The second public debate featured intense policy friction concerning municipal finance and municipal infrastructure management. Akhyar targeted Bobby's development proposals by questioning the financial viability of his proposed fiscal strategies, specifically challenging the logistical feasibility of managing a projected 30 trillion rupiah development budget for the city.

== Turnout and results ==
Voting occurred on 9 December 2020, amid widespread public health protocols. Despite a registered electorate totaling 1,601,001 eligible voters across the municipality, the election suffered from low voter turnout, with only 736,113 total valid ballots cast. The final tabulation certified by the General Elections Commission confirmed Bobby Nasution as the winner, securing 393,533 votes, representing 53.5 percent of the popular vote. Akhyar Nasution finished second with 342,580 votes, capturing 46.5 percent of the electorate. The results consolidated a major shift in the city's executive leadership, shifting control of the mayoral seat from the Democratic Party back to the PDI-P alignment.
