= Akhyar Nasution =

Indonesian politician (born 1966)

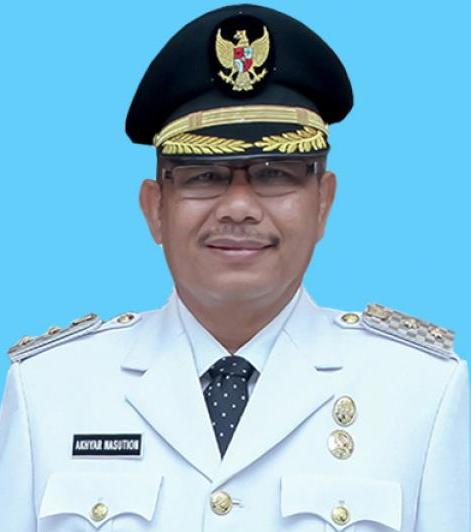

Mayor of Medan
- In office 17 October 2019 (Note: Acting mayor between 17 October 2019 and 11 February 2021.) – 17 February 2021
- Preceded by: Dzulmi Eldin
- Succeeded by: Bobby Nasution

Deputy Mayor of Medan
- In office 17 February 2016 – 17 October 2019
- Preceded by: Dzulmi Eldin
- Succeeded by: Aulia Rachman

Personal details
- Born: 21 July 1966 (age 59) Medan, North Sumatra, Indonesia
- Political party: Demokrat (since 2020); PDI-P (until 2020)

Akhyar Nasution (born 21 July 1966) is an Indonesian politician who served as mayor of Medan between 2019 and 2021, mostly as an acting mayor to replace his predecessor Dzulmi Eldin.

== Biography ==
Nasution was born on 21 July 1966 in Medan, and completed his basic education there. He studied engineering at the University of North Sumatra, where he obtained his bachelor's degree in 1996, and later a masters and a doctorate also from the same university. He initially began studying physics, but dropped out and briefly worked as a laboratory staff at a cooking oil factory before returning to his studies in 1988. Following his bachelors, he began working at a construction company as a designer and supervisor.

In 1999, he was elected into Medan's city council as a PDI-P candidate until 2004. After his term in the legislature, he became self-employed until 2016, when he was elected as Medan's vice-mayor along with Dzulmi Eldin.

On 17 October 2019, Nasution was appointed as acting mayor of Medan following the arrest of Eldin for corruption. He would remain as acting mayor for nearly the entirety of the remaining mayoral term, although he was officially sworn in as mayor on 11 February 2021, six days prior to the mayoral term's expiry on 17 February.

Nasution had attempted to run for a second term in the 2020 mayoral election, but he was defeated by Bobby Nasution. He had been removed from PDI-P for opposing Bobby's candidacy (which competed with his own), and hence he ran with the support of Demokrat and PKS. In 2024, he ran as a candidate for the North Sumatra Regional House of Representatives, but was not elected.
