= Widjiatno Notomihardjo =

Indonesian businessman (1940–2000)

- Notomihardjo in the 1970s
- Born: 30 December 1940; Karanganyar, then part of the Dutch East Indies
- Died: 23 July 2000 (aged 59); Jakarta, Indonesia
- Burial place: TPU Dusun Mundu, Karanganyar, Central Java
- Known for: Father of Joko Widodo
- Spouse: Sudjiatmi (m. 1959)
- Children: Joko Widodo; Iit Sriyantini; Titik Relawati; Idayati

Widjiatno Notomihardjo (30 December 1940 – 23 July 2000) was an Indonesian businessman, best known for being the father of Joko Widodo, the seventh president of Indonesia. He was a successful wood merchant in Surakarta and entered politics through the Indonesian Democratic Party of Struggle shortly prior to his death.

== Early life ==
Notomihardjo was born on 30 December 1940 in the village of Kragan, in what is today Karanganyar Regency of Central Java. He was the son of Lamidi Wirjo Mihardjo, who was the lurah (village chief) of his home village. Mihardjo married thrice, and Notomihardjo was born from his first wife. Mihardjo's father, Mangun Dinomo, was also a lurah at a different village in Boyolali. Notomihardjo studied until high school and on 23 August 1959, at the age of 18, he married Sudjiatmi. Sudjiatmi was 16 at the time.

== Career ==
After marrying Sudjiatmi, Notomihardjo moved to Surakarta. Sudjiatmi's father Wirorejo worked in the lumber trade, and helped Notomihardjo in starting his own business, CV Roda Jati. The couple also traded in bamboo. During their time in Surakarta, Notomihardjo and Sudjiatmi had four surviving children: Joko Widodo, Iit Sriyantini, Ida Yati, and Titik Relawati, in addition to a stillborn son, Joko Lukito. As there were few competitors in Surakarta trading in teak wood, Notomihardjo's business gradually expanded, sourcing wood from more remote areas. During the purges against the Indonesian Communist Party, although Surakarta was heavily impacted, Notomihardjo was not arrested or investigated as he lacked any connection to the Indonesian Communist Party. Several of his neighbors, however, were arrested by soldiers.

In the 1970s, Notomihardjo along with his family were displaced from their home by a market and bus terminal expansion project. He moved to a new house, and his workshop along with him. Later on, Sudjiatmi handled more of the day-to-day aspects of the business, while Notomihardjo focused on sourcing raw materials. Following the fall of Suharto in 1998, Notomihardjo began to participate in politics, joining the Indonesian Democratic Party of Struggle and becoming a local party official in Surakarta under the leadership of F. X. Hadi Rudyatmo.

== Death and burial ==
Notomihardjo died on 23 July 2000 in Jakarta, aged 59 years and 6 months old (for he was five months short of his 60th birthday later in December). He had been suffering from a hernia, and intended to go to Singapore for a surgery, but died whilst receiving medical treatment at a hospital in Jakarta. He was buried in Gondangrejo village, Karanganyar, at Sudjiatmi's family burial site. His funeral drew large crowds in Surakarta.

== Personal life ==
During his youth, Notomihardjo owned a Birmingham Small Arms motorbike, which he was known for riding around in his home village. He was also a fan of kroncong music, which, according to a family housekeeper, he had requested on his deathbed. He also sponsored a kroncong group in Surakarta.
