= State Islamic University of North Sumatra =

University in Medan, North Sumatra, Indonesia

- Universitas Islam Negeri (UIN) Sumatera Utara
- Former names: State Islamic Institute of North Sumatra (IAIN SU)
- Established: 19 November 1973 (as IAIN SU); 16 October 2014 (as UIN SU)
- Location: Medan, Sumatera Utara, Indonesia
- Colors: Green
- Nickname: UINSU
- Website: uinsu.ac.id
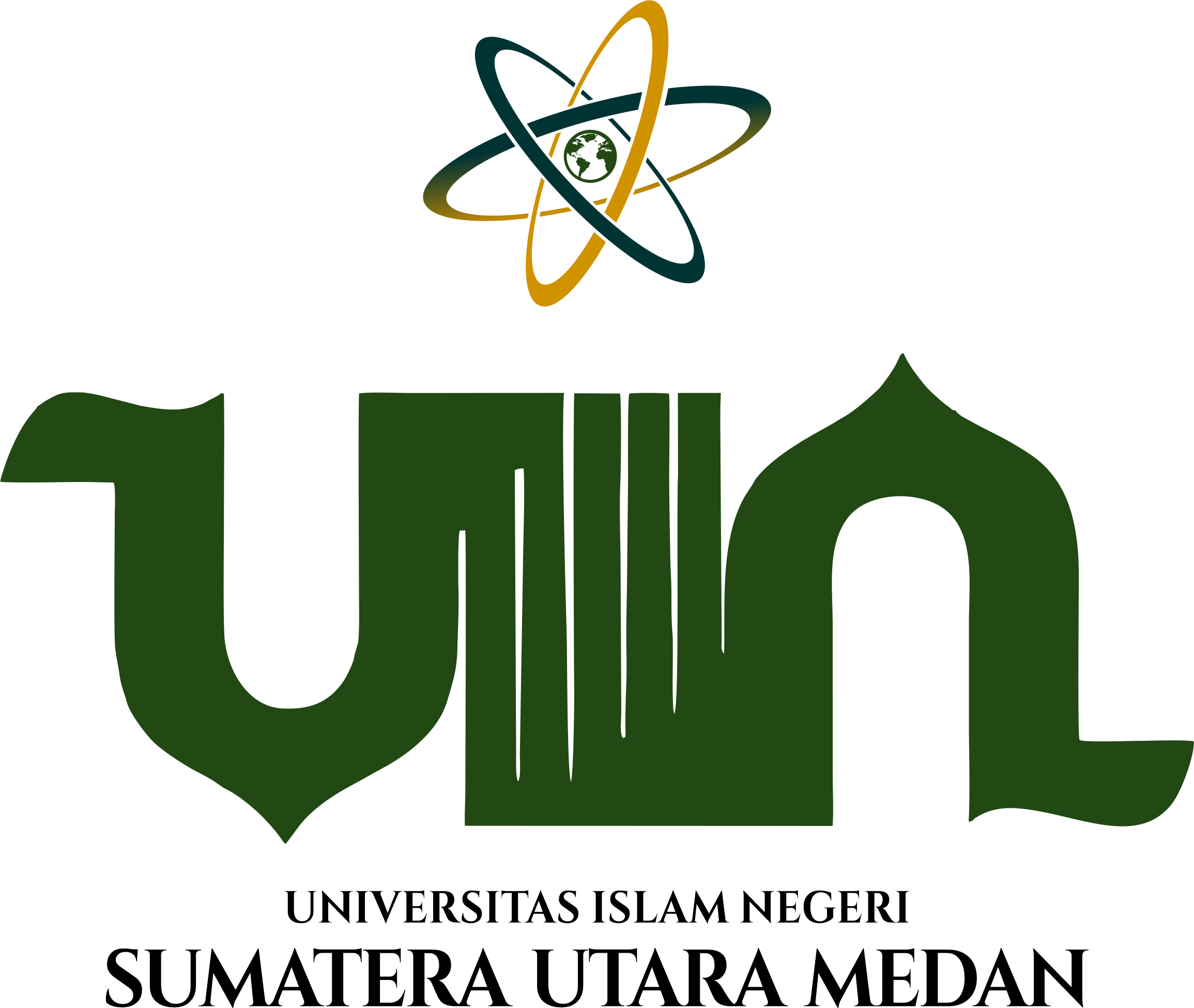

State Islamic University of North Sumatra (Bahasa Indonesia: Universitas Islam Negeri (UIN) Sumatera Utara, abbreviated as UINSU) is a state Islamic university located in the large city of Medan, North Sumatra, and is the only state Islamic university in North Sumatra.

Like most of State Islamic University, State Islamic University of North Sumatra is also a college education provider in addition to Islamic studies.

== History ==
When IAIN of North Sumatra was established in 1973, its main mission was to serve as an Islamic university institution that transmitted Islamic knowledge in the sense of 'ulûm dîniyyah. Along with the knowledge development and the needs of national development, then in the era of the 1990s, IAIN SU entered a new phase which was characterized by the provision of a wider mandate. Furthermore, entering the era of the 2000s, IAIN SU enters a more developed stage that is not just a wider mandate, but also has to lead to scientific integration. This development was then followed up by the transfer of institutional status of IAIN of North Sumatra to State Islamic University of North Sumatra (Universitas Islam Negeri Sumatera Utara). Furthermore, it is in line with this change that the study of knowledge at IAIN has changed from monodiscipliner to interdisciplinary and transdisciplinary. Thus, the vision and mission of knowledge in UIN SU has also been changed, in accordance with the changes and the development of present social life. From a paradigm point of view, UIN SU uses the living system as a paradigm master, which aims to expand ideas and simplifies the process of combining different kinds of knowledge into one container.

== Campuses ==
=== Campus I ===
Campus I is located in Jalan IAIN No.1 Medan 20235. Campus I is dedicated to the Faculty of Science and Technology, Faculty of Public Health, also dedicated to Postgraduate (Pascasarjana).

=== Campus II ===
Located in Jalan Williem Iskandar Pasar V Medan Estate 20371. Campus II is the administrative center of State Islamic University of North Sumatra (UINSU). In the location of campus II there are faculties, they are Faculty of Tarbiya and Teaching Sciences, Faculty of Syari'a and Law, Faculty of Ushuluddin and Islamic Studies, Faculty of Da'wa and Communication Science, Faculty of Islamic Economics and Business, and Faculty of Social Sciences.

== Faculties and Programs ==
Currently, State Islamic University of North Sumatra already has eight faculties and 54 programs consisting of S1, S2 and S3, and has a postgraduate program. Three faculties of which were just inaugurated after switching from IAIN to UIN, they are Faculty of Science and Technology, Faculty of Social Sciences, and Faculty of Public Health. The eight faculties are:

- Faculty of Tarbiya and Teacher Training (Fakultas Ilmu Tarbiyah dan Keguruan, FITK)
- Faculty of Syari'a and Law (Fakultas Syari'ah dan Hukum, FSH)
- Faculty of Ushuluddin and Islamic Studies (Fakultas Ushuluddin dan Studi Islam, FUSI)
- Faculty of Da'wa and Communication Science (Fakultas Dakwah dan Komunikasi, FDK)
- Faculty of Islamic Economics and Business (Fakultas Ekonomi dan Bisnis Islam, FEBI)
- Faculty of Science and Technology (Fakultas Sains dan Teknologi, F-SAINTEK)
- Faculty of Social Sciences (Fakultas Ilmu Sosial, FIS)
- Faculty of Public Health (Fakultas Kesehatan Masyarakat, FKM)
- Postgraduate

=== Faculty of Tarbiya and Teacher Training ===
This faculty offers studies in the following departments and study programs:

- Islamic Education Management (S1)
- Mathematics Education (S1)
- Madrasah Ibtidaiyah Teaching Education (S1)
- Social Sciences Education (S1)
- Raudhatul Athfal Teaching Education (S1)
- Islamic Guidance Counseling (S1)
- English Education (S1)
- Arabic Education (S1)
- Islamic Religion Education (S1)
- Biology Education (S1)

=== Faculty of Syari'a and Law ===
This faculty offers studies in the following departments and study programs:

- Jinayah (Islamic Criminal Law) (S1)
- Ahwal Al-Syakhshiyah (Islamic Family Law) (S1)
- Comparative Mazhab (S1)
- Syari'a Economic Law/Muamalah (S1)
- Siyasah (Constitutional Law) (S1)

=== Faculty of Ushuluddin and Islamic Studies ===
This faculty offers studies in the following departments and study programs:

- Al-Quran and Tafsir (S1)
- Hadith Science (S1)
- Islamic Aqidah and Philosophy (S1)
- Islamic Political Thought (S1)
- Study of Religion (S1)
- Hadith Science (S2)
- Al-Quran and Tafsir Science (S2)

=== Faculty of Da'wa and Communication Science ===
The Faculty of Da'wa and Communication Science includes the following departments and study programs:

- Communications and Islamic Broadcasting (S1)
- Islamic Guidance and Counseling (S1)
- Da'wa Management (S1)
- Development of Islamic Society (S1)

=== Faculty of Islamic Economics and Business ===
The Faculty of Islamic Economics and Business includes the following departments and study programs:

- Syari'a Insurance (S1)
- Syari'a Banking (S1)
- Islamic Economics (S1)
- Syari'a Accounting (S1)
- Syari'a Banking (D3)

=== Faculty of Science and Technology ===
The Faculty of Science and Technology includes the following departments and study programs:

- Computer Science (S1)
- Information Systems (S1)
- Mathematics (S1)
- Biology (S1)
- Physics (S1)

=== Faculty of Social Sciences ===
The Faculty of Social Sciences includes the following departments and study programs:

- Science Communication (S1)
- Library Science (S1)
- Islamic History and Civilizations (S1)
- Sociology of Religion (S1)

=== Faculty of Public Health ===
The Faculty of Public Health includes the following departments and study programs:

- Public Health Science (S1)

=== Postgraduate ===
The Postgraduate School (Pascasarjana) to get a master and doctorate level. The following departments and study programs are:

- Islamic Thoughts (S2)
- Islamic Law (S2)
- Islamic Education (S2)
- Islamic Economic (S2)
- Islamic Communication (S2)
- Hadith Science (S2)
- Islamic Law (S3)
- Islamic Education (S3)
- Islamic Religion and Philosophy (S3)
- Islamic Communication (S3)
- Islamic Economic (S3)
- Hadith Science (S3)
