= Idayati =

Indonesian philanthropist

- Born: 26 May 1966 (age 59); Surakarta, Central Java, Indonesia
- Occupations: Philanthropist; homemaker
- Spouses: Hari Mulyono (died 2018) Anwar Usman (m. 2022)
- Children: 2
- Parents: Widjiatno Notomihardjo (father); Sudjiatmi (mother)
- Relatives: Joko Widodo (brother); Iriana (sister-in-law); Gibran Rakabuming Raka (nephew); Kaesang Pangarep (nephew)

Idayati (born 26 May 1966) is an Indonesian philanthropist. She is the sister of President Joko Widodo and wife of judge Anwar Usman.

== Early life ==
Idayati was born on 26 May 1966 in Surakarta, Central Java, as the third child and second daughter of Sudjiatmi and Widjianto Notomiharjo's four children. Her two sisters are Sriyantini and Titik Relawati. She graduated from SMA Negeri 4 Surakarta in 1985.

== Personal life ==
Idayati married Hari Mulyono, a businessman who led PT Rakabu Sejahtera, which was owned by Widodo and Indonesian Barecore Association. They had a son, Adityo Rimbo Galih Samudra (born 1995), and a daughter, Septiara Silvani Putri (born 1990). Their marriage lasted until Mulyono's death from stroke and hypertension in 2018.

In October 2021, Idayati was introduced by her friend to Usman, Chief Justice of the Constitutional Court of Indonesia. He proposed her on 12 March 2022, and they married at Graha Saba Buana in Surakarta, on 26 May, during her 56th birthday. Their marriage resulted in perceived conflicts of interest and politics that were denied by her daughter. Her husband stated that he didn't know Idayati was Joko Widodo's sister when they met.
