= Muhammad Saleh Arifin =

Indonesian military officer and politician

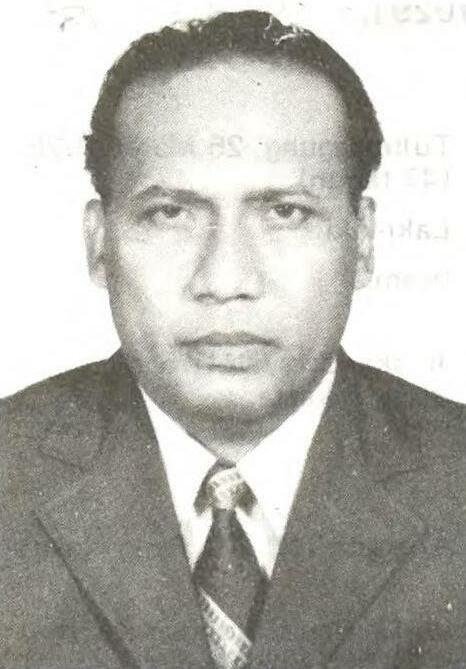
- Arifin, c. 1971

Mayor of Medan
- In office 31 July 1975^{[a]} – 31 March 1980
- Preceded by: Sjoerkani
- Succeeded by: Agus Salim Rangkuti

Personal details
- Born: 23 November 1926; Medan, Dutch East Indies
- a. Acting from 27 July 1974

Muhammad Saleh Arifin (23 November 1926 – ?) was an Indonesian military officer and politician who served as the mayor of Medan between 1974 and 1980, and was also a member of the People's Consultative Assembly.

== Biography ==
Arifin was born in Medan on 23 November 1926. He received seven years of education at a Taman Siswa school, and spent a year studying economics in Kayutanam, West Sumatra. After working at a bookstore in Medan and at a plantation in Binjai during the Japanese occupation of the Dutch East Indies, he joined the Indonesian Army during the Indonesian National Revolution. Later on, he also completed junior and senior high schools in Medan, before enrolling at the infantry officer school in Bandung.

He then remained stationed in North Sumatra until 1963 when he was reassigned to Kodam Siliwangi for a year. He was assigned to North Sumatra and became an assistant to the regional military commander at Kodam I/Bukit Barisan.

He was then appointed to become the provincial party chairman for Golkar in North Sumatra. He would hold this office until 1973. In 1971, he was appointed to become a member of the newly formed People's Consultative Assembly as an army delegate with the rank of colonel. (Until 2004, a bloc of seats in the Assembly was reserved for police and military officers.) He later served as the mayor of Medan, initially as acting mayor starting on 27 July 1974 to replace Sjoerkani. He was then appointed as full mayor on 31 July 1975, with his full term ending on 31 March 1980. During his tenure, a high-profile gambling area operated in Medan with a municipal permit, which Arifin explicitly defended against media criticism. According to Arifin, the gambling organizers agreed to pay a sum of Rp 15 million (~USD 36,000 at 1970s peg) every month to the municipal government, and would only be open for three months. He further stated that the funds would be used to construct a new street.

He is buried at the Bukit Barisan Heroes' Cemetery in Medan.
