= Sudjiatmi =

Mother of Joko Widodo (1943–2020)

Sudjiatmi Notomihardjo
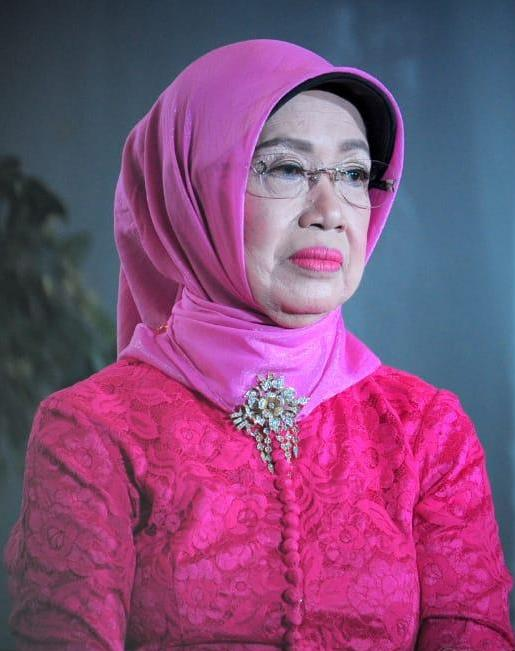
- Sudjiatmi on Mother's Day, 2018
- Born: Sudjiatmi Wiroredjo; 15 February 1943; Boyolali, Japanese East Indies
- Died: 25 March 2020 (aged 77); Surakarta, Indonesia
- Burial place: TPU Dusun Mundu, Karanganyar, Central Java
- Known for: Mother of Joko Widodo
- Spouse: Widjiatno Notomihardjo (m. 1959; died 2000)
- Children: Joko Widodo; Iit Sriyantini; Titik Relawati; Idayati

Sudjiatmi Notomihardjo (née Wiroredjo; 15 February 1943 – 25 March 2020) was the mother of the 7th president of Indonesia, Joko Widodo and the grandmother of the 14th vice president of Indonesia, Gibran Rakabuming Raka. Along with her husband, Widjiatno Notomihardjo, she was a wood trader from Surakarta.

== Biography ==
Sudjiatmi was born on 15 February 1943 in Boyolali, Central Java, as the second child and only daughter of Wiroredjo and Insani "Sani" Wiroredjo (1913 – 23 October 2015). Her brothers were Miyono Suryo Sarjono (1940 – 27 February 2022) and Setiawan Prasetyo (born 1948).

Her father, Wiroredjo was a wood trader from Giriroto, Ngemplak, Boyolali whilst her mother, Sani was a housewife.

Later, she ran her wood business with her husband, Widjiatno Notomihardjo, although it was not very successful and the newly married couple struggled at the beginning of their marriage, for they were both school dropouts and were from different socio-economic backgrounds.
