= Bachtiar Djafar =

Indonesian politician and military officer

Mayor of Medan
- In office 2 April 1990 – 31 March 2000
- Preceded by: Agus Salim Rangkuti
- Succeeded by: Abdillah

Personal details
- Born: 27 July 1939; Labuhan Deli, Dutch East Indies
- Died: 3 August 2021 (aged 82); Medan, North Sumatra, Indonesia

Bachtiar Djafar (27 July 1939 – 3 August 2021) was an Indonesian military officer and politician who served as the mayor of Medan, North Sumatra between 1990 and 2000.

== Biography ==
Djafar was born in Labuhan Deli, in what is today Deli Serdang Regency, on 27 July 1939.

He served in the Indonesian Army prior to his government career, including some time as part of Kopassus. Djafar was sworn in as mayor of Medan on 2 April 1990. At that time, he held the rank of colonel, and was the first person of Malay descent to serve as mayor of Medan. He secured his second term in 1995. Prior to Djafar, Indonesian mayors of Medan were of Batak or Mandailing descent.

Djafar was known for the development of the northern districts of Medan during his tenure. Under Djafar, the city government also conducted restoration works at the 1854-built Al-Osmani Mosque. The municipal government also conducted dredging works at the city's Deli River, which would not be done by Djafar's later successors. During his tenure as mayor, he served as chair of the advisory council within Medan's Golkar branch.

His tenure as mayor expired on 31 March 2000. After his tenure as mayor, he continued to serve as an advisor within Golkar. He also ran as a senatorial candidate for North Sumatra in the 2004 Indonesian legislative election, but was not elected. Djafar received the honorary title of Datuk from the Sultanate of Langkat in March 2013. He was married to Rosmeini Bachtiar, and the couple has two children.

Djafar died on 3 August 2021. After his death, a newly established public hospital in the Medan Labuhan district was renamed after him in December 2022.
