= State University of Medan =

- Universitas Negeri Medan
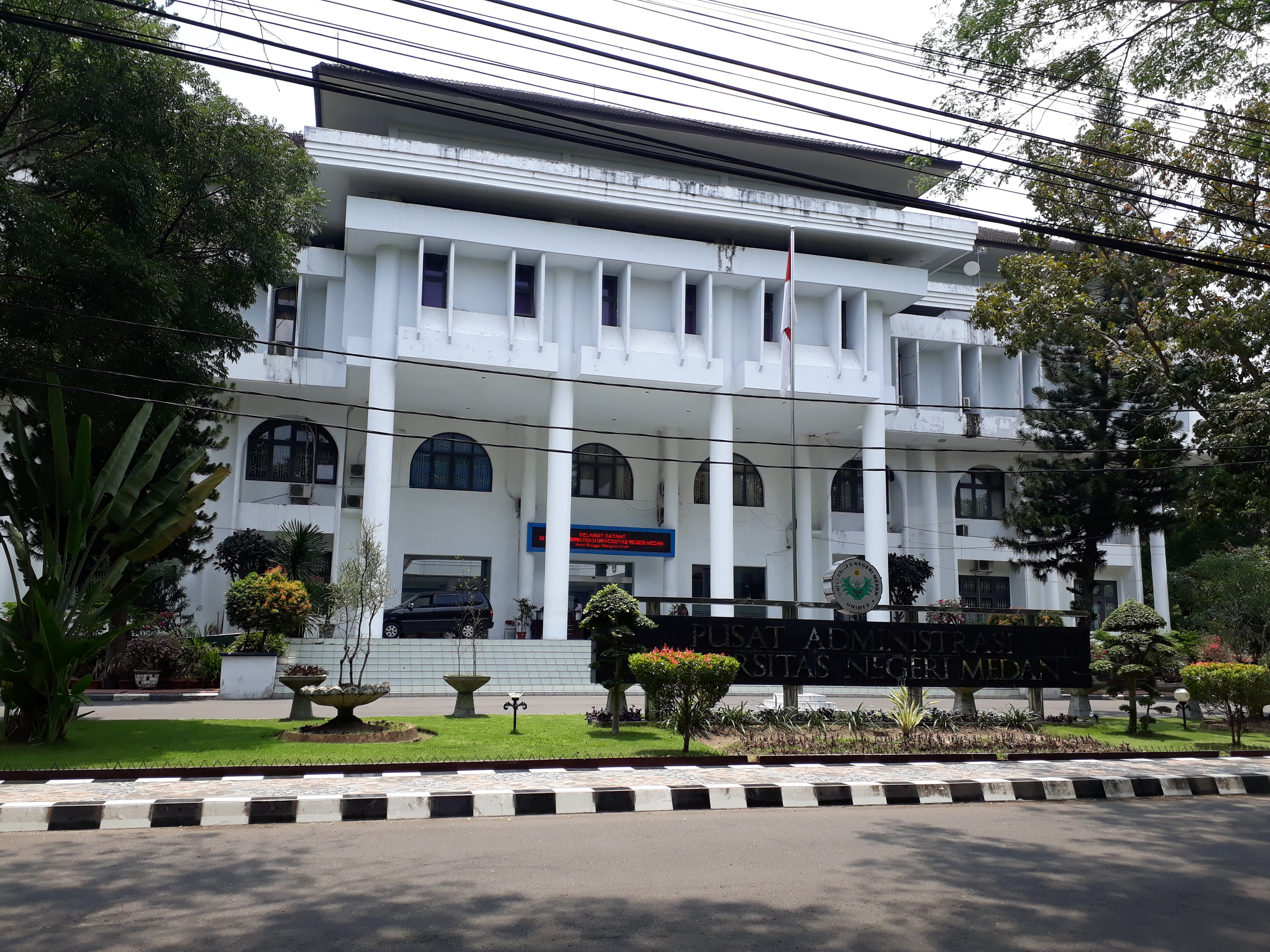
- Main administration building (Rectorate)
- Former names: Medan Teachers Training College; Medan Institute for Teachers Training and Education
- Motto: Kerjakan Sesuatu Dengan Ikhlas dan Benar
- Motto in English: Do Something Sincerely and Correctly
- Type: Public
- Established: 1963
- Rector: Prof. Dr. Ir. Baharuddin, S.T., M.Pd.
- Location: Deli Serdang Regency, North Sumatra, Indonesia
- Campus: Urban
- Website: www.unimed.ac.id
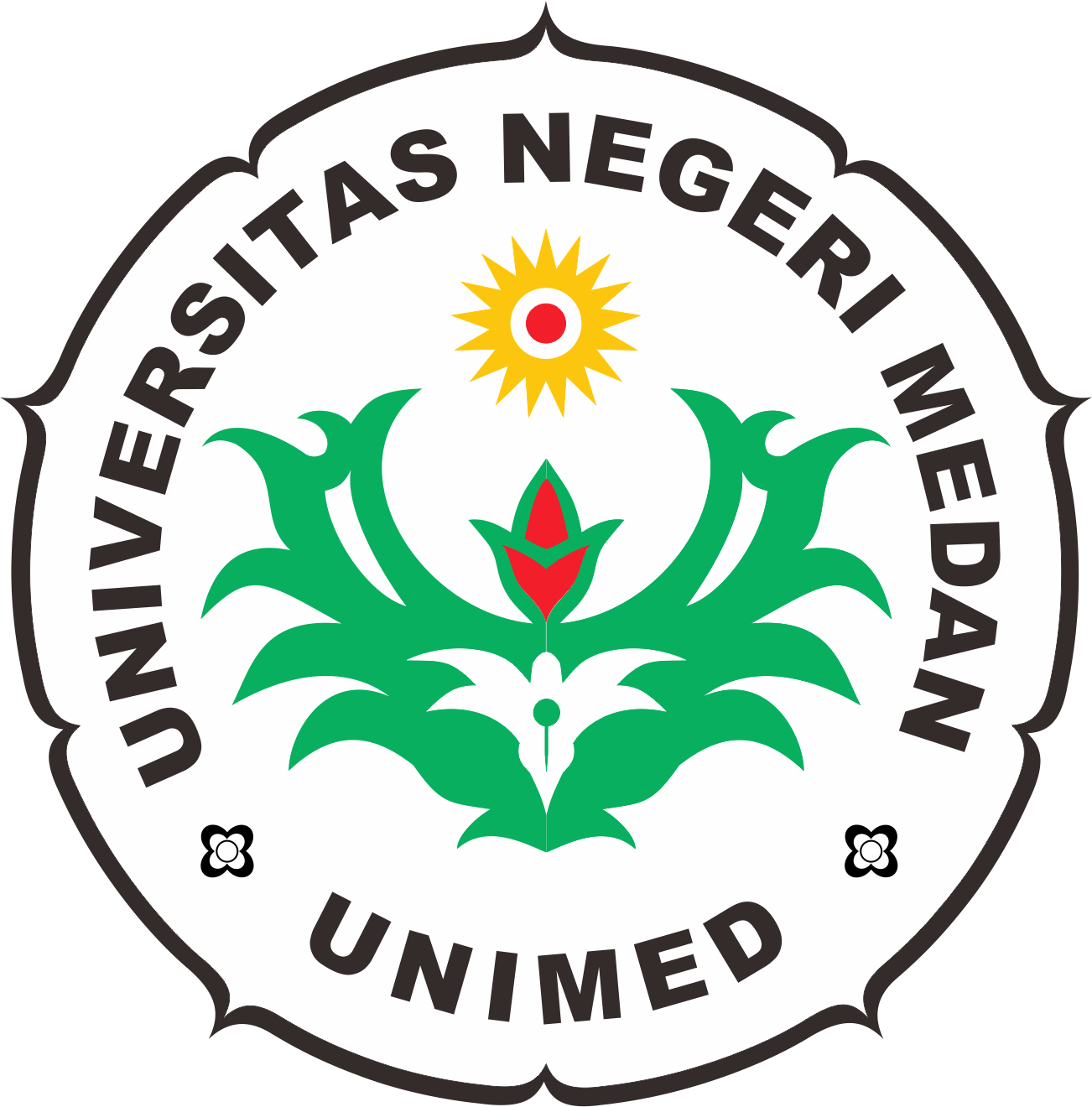

State University of Medan (Indonesian: Universitas Negeri Medan) or UNIMED is a public university located in the regency of Deli Serdang in North Sumatra, Indonesia (near the Medan City border).

== History ==
Initially known as the Teachers Training College, Medan State University (MSU) was established in 1956. It is one of the oldest universities in the country with rich history (Indonesian: Perguruan Tinggi Pendidikan Guru) in Medan. On 27 August 1957, the college was absorbed into the University of North Sumatra as a result it became the university's Faculty for Teachers Training and Education (Indonesian: Fakultas Keguruan dan Ilmu Pendidikan).

As a result of the establishment of a branch campus of the Institute for Teachers Training and Education in Medan on 23 June 1963, the faculty gained autonomy (Indonesian: Institut Keguruan dan Ilmu Pendidikan or IKIP). In 1964, the Physical Education faculty was separated from the institute and was established as the Sports Institute (Indonesian: Sekolah Tinggi Olahraga) only to be reintegrated back into IKIP Medan system in 1977.

On October 7, 1999, IKIP Medan received university status. It was re-opened as Medan State University in February 2000, upon granting and receiving the university status.

== Academics ==
State University of Medan provides programmes ranging from undergraduate diplomas to postgraduate doctorates from the following faculties:

=== Undergraduate programs ===
Faculty of Education	Faculty of Language and Arts	Faculty of Social Studies
Extra-Curricular Education; Primary School Teachers Training; Education Administration; Education Psychology & Counselling; Education Technology	Indonesian language and literature; Indonesian Language Studies; Indonesian Literature; English language and literature; English Language Studies; English Literature; Foreign languages; German Language Studies; French Language Studies; Dramatic arts, dance and music; Dance Studies; Music Studies; Fine arts; Fine Arts Studies	Pancasila and Citizenship Studies; History; Geography
Faculty of Mathematics and Natural Sciences	Faculty of Engineering	Faculty of Sports Sciences
Mathematics; Education (Mathematics); Mathematics; Physics; Education (Physics); Physics; Chemistry; Education (Chemistry); Chemistry; Biology; Education (Biology); Biology	Civil Engineering; Mechanical Engineering; Electronic Engineering; Food Science; Fashion Design	Physical Education and Recreation; Physical Education in Schools; Health and Recreational Studies; Sports Training; Sports Studies
Faculty of Economics	Television University	
Economics; Accounting Studies; Business Studies; Office Administration; Accountancy; Management; Digital Business; Entrepreneurship; Management Science	International School; Hong Kong, Macau and Chinese Taipei; Singapore International School	

=== Postgraduate programs ===
Listed below are the number of postgraduate programs available at the university, including:

- Applied Linguistics (English language)
- Education Technology
- Education Administration
- Chemistry
- Social Anthropology
- Development Studies
- Mathematics
- Education Management

== Partnerships ==
The State University of Medm has international partnerships worldwide, such as:

- Kyushu University (Japan)
- Universiti Malaysia Perlis (Malaysia)
- National Dong Hwa University (Taiwan)
- National University of Malaysia (Malaysia)
- Universiti Sains Malaysia (Malaysia)
- University of Malaya (Malaysia)
- Universiti Utara Malaysia (Malaysia)
- Macquarie University (Australia)
- Edge Hill University (United Kingdom)
- Academy of Sciences Malaysia (Malaysia)
- National Taiwan Normal University (Taiwan)
- Utrecht University (Netherlands)
- Nihon University (Japan)
- Universiti Poly-Tech Malaysia (Malaysia)
- Universiti Teknikal Malaysia Melaka (Malaysia)
- Université de Moncton (Canada)
- National University of Singapore (Singapore)
- Curtin University (Australia)
- St. Rita's College of Balingasag (Philipina)
- Technische Universität Dresden (Germany)
- Bangkok Thonburi University (Thailand)
- Songkhla Rajabhat University (Thailand)
- Rajabhat University system (Thailand)
- Dimitrie Cantemir Christian University (Romania)
- Politehnica University of Bucharest (Romania)

== See also ==
- List of universities in Indonesia
- Medan
