= Agus Salim Rangkuti =

Indonesian politician and military officer

- Rangkuti in 1980

Mayor of Medan
- In office 1980 – 31 March 1990
- Preceded by: Muhammad Saleh Arifin
- Succeeded by: Bachtiar Djafar

Personal details
- Born: 10 August 1928; Lubuk Pakam, Dutch East Indies

Agus Salim Rangkuti (10 August 1928 – ?) was an Indonesian military officer and politician who served as the mayor of Medan, North Sumatra between 1980 and 1990. Prior to his government career, he had served in the Indonesian Army, and also worked as an actor.

== Early life ==
Rangkuti was born in the town of Lubuk Pakam, today in Deli Serdang Regency of North Sumatra, on 10 August 1928. He was of Mandailing descent.

== Career ==
In his youth, Rangkuti fought during the Indonesian National Revolution in North Sumatra; he held the rank of second lieutenant and was stationed at Binjai to command a subdetachment of the Military Police Corps. After the war, Rangkuti acted in several movies during the 1950s. He served as the chairman of the Medan Board of Art, and he was an honorary chairman of the North Sumatran Movie Actors Association. He had also studied law in North Sumatra.

Rangkuti continued to serve within the military police corps of the Indonesian Army, and he enrolled in the Indonesian Army Command and General Staff College in 1965. Within the corps, he served as commander at the Buru Island political prison camp between 1973 and 1975, with the rank of lieutenant colonel. In one occasion, he asked the imprisoned filmmaker Basuki Effendy to establish a band made up of the prisoners. Rangkuti had previously acted in one of Effendy's movies. With prisoner labour, Rangkuti also opened a recreational park in Buru.

Rangkuti rose to the rank of colonel, and beginning in 1980 he served two-terms as mayor of Medan. His second term ended on 31 March 1990, and he was replaced by Bachtiar Djafar.

He is buried at the Bukit Barisan Heroes' Cemetery in Medan.
