= Sjoerkani =

Indonesian politician

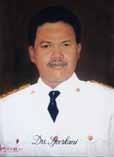
- Sjoerkani as Mayor of Medan

Vice Governor of West Sumatra
- In office October 1987 – 30 October 1992
- Governor: Hasan Basri Durin
- Preceded by: Sarudji Ismail
- Succeeded by: Muchlis Ibrahim

Regional Secretary of West Sumatra
- In office 1981–1987
- Preceded by: Mahyudin Algamar
- Succeeded by: Karseno

Mayor of Medan
- In office 26 September 1966 – 27 July 1974
- Preceded by: Aminurrasjid
- Succeeded by: Muhammad Saleh Arifin

Personal details
- Born: 18 August 1931 Solok, Dutch East Indies
- Died: 5 February 2007 (aged 75)

Sjoerkani (18 August 1931 – 5 February 2007) was an Indonesian bureaucrat and politician. He served as the vice governor of West Sumatra between 1987 and 1992, and was also the province's secretary between 1981 and 1987. He also served as the mayor of Medan between 1966 and 1974.

== Early life ==
Sjoerkani was born in Solok, today part of West Sumatra, on 18 August 1931. He studied in Padang and Bukittinggi, graduating from high school in 1951. In 1955, he began to work as a civil servant in Bukittinggi, part of the Central Sumatra provincial government, before enrolling at Gadjah Mada University to study governmental sciences.

== Career ==
After graduating from university, he was assigned as a civil servant at the North Sumatra Governor's office in Medan. He was considered as a candidate for city secretary of Medan in 1963, but was not selected. On 26 September 1966, he was appointed as acting mayor of Medan to replace Aminurrasjid. His appointment was backed by the Pemuda Pancasila organization, who championed Sjoerkani's candidacy over that of another candidate backed by the regional military command. Sjoerkani had been the vice president of Pemuda Patriotik, an organization which had practically merged with Pemuda Pancasila in 1965.

In January 1967, Sjoerkani announced a "crash" program to improve the city's infrastructure, including the repair of roads and ditches and the construction of a school and two clinics. He also began celebrating the city's anniversary in 1970, initially setting the founding date on 1 April 1909. Following a controversy, Sjoerkani formed a special committee which instead placed the date at 1 July 1590, although this change would only be made official in 1975. In 1972, after the club won three consecutive national championships, Sjoerkani granted the city's football club PSMS Medan the Kebun Bunga Stadium as its home stadium. Sjoerkani was replaced by Muhammad Saleh Arifin on 27 July 1974.

After his mayoral tenure, Sjoerkani became deputy leader of North Sumatra's development agency until 1980. He then moved to West Sumatra, becoming the provincial secretary in 1981 to replace Mahyudin Algamar. He would serve until 1987, when he was elevated to vice governor, being sworn in early October 1987. The governor, Hasan Basri Durin, would be sworn in several weeks after Sjoerkani. He ran as a gubernatorial candidate in 1992 against Hasan's second term, but placed third in the legislature's vote with 8 votes to Hasan's 23 votes.

He served as chairman of the Mahaputra Muhammad Yamin University's Foundation in Solok between 2001 and 2005.
