= Dzulmi Eldin =

Indonesian politician

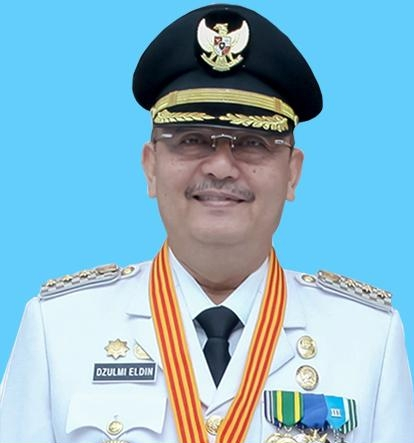

21st Mayor of Medan
- In office 17 February 2016 – 17 October 2019
- President: Joko Widodo
- Governor: Tengku Erry Nuradi
- Deputy: Akhyar Nasution
- Preceded by: Randiman Tarigan
- Succeeded by: Akhyar Nasution
- In office 15 May 2013 – 26 July 2015
- President: Susilo Bambang Yudhoyono; Joko Widodo
- Governor: Gatot Pujo Nugroho
- Preceded by: Rahudman Harahap
- Succeeded by: Syaiful Bahri Lubis (act.)

Deputy Mayor of Medan
- In office 26 July 2010 – 15 May 2013
- President: Susilo Bambang Yudhoyono
- Governor: Syamsul Arifin; Gatot Pujo Nugroho (Act.)
- Preceded by: Ramli
- Succeeded by: Akhyar Nasution

Personal details
- Born: July 4, 1960 (age 66) Medan, North Sumatra
- Party: Golkar
- Spouse: Rita Maharani
- Education: Satyagama University

Dzulmi Eldin (born July 4, 1960) is an Indonesian former politician who served as the mayor of Medan, North Sumatra, between 2013 and 2019. A graduate of Satyagama University's Masters program, he started his career in the government as a section chief in Deli Serdang Regency administration in 1992, before slowly rising in rank to become the city secretary of Medan by 2007. In 2010, he was elected as deputy mayor prior the removal of sitting mayor Rahudman Harahap in 2013, after which he was elevated to the mayor rank. He ran in the 2015 local elections, managing to secure 340,406 votes (71.72%).

He was arrested by the Corruption Eradication Commission on 16 October 2019. He was sentenced to six years' prison in June 2020 for receiving bribes from civil servants, and was released on parole in February 2023.
