= Rahudman Harahap =

Indonesian politician (born 1959)

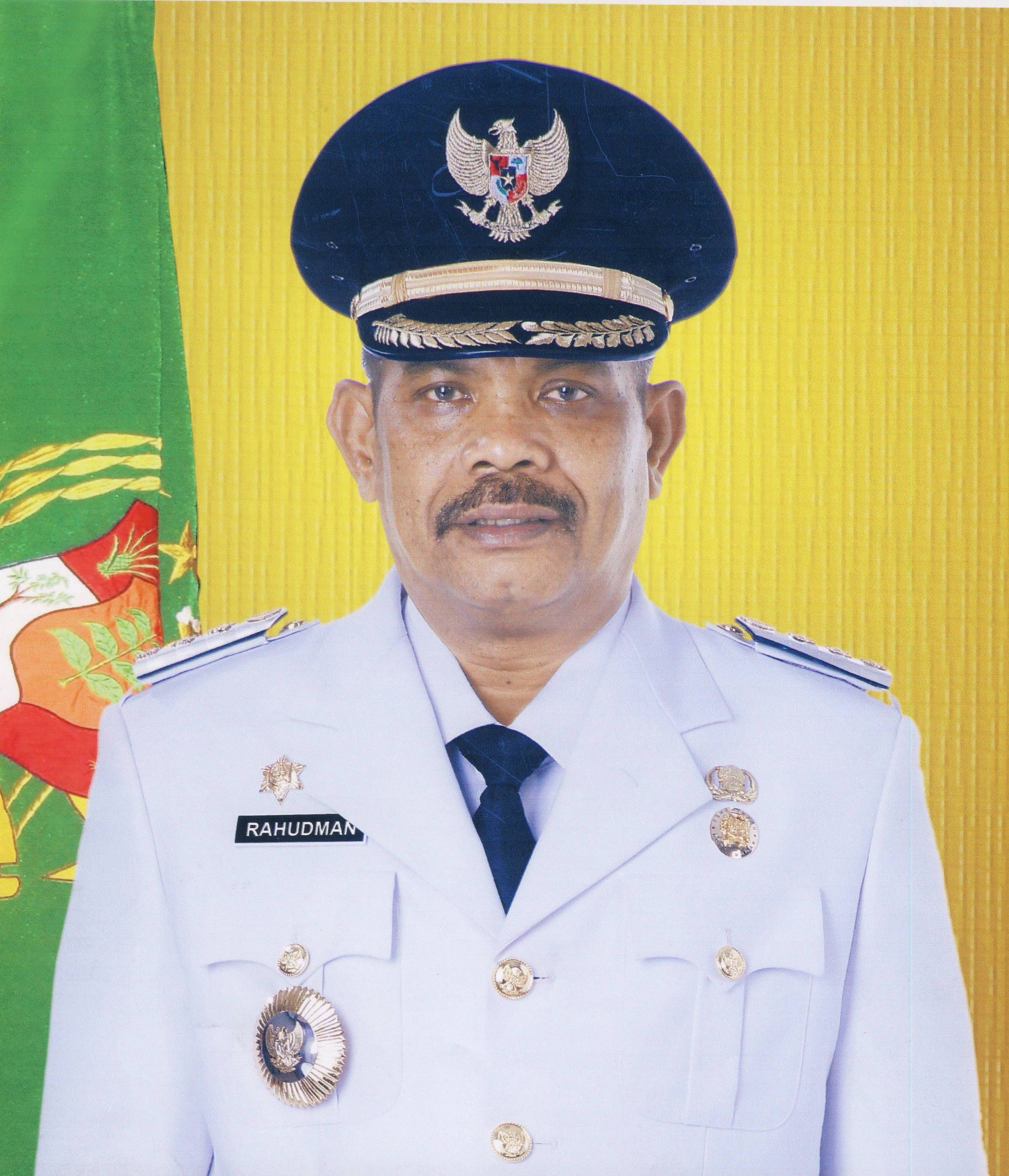
- Harahap in 2010

Mayor of Medan
- In office 26 July 2010^{[a]} – 10 May 2013
- Preceded by: Abdillah; Afifuddin Lubis (acting)
- Succeeded by: Dzulmi Eldin

Personal details
- Born: 21 January 1959 (age 67) Padang Lawas, North Sumatra, Indonesia
- Party: Nasdem
- Children: 4
- Education: North Sumatra Islamic University
- a. Acting from 22 July 2009

Rahudman Harahap (born 21 January 1959) is an Indonesian politician and civil servant who served as the mayor of Medan, North Sumatra, between 2009 and 2013. Prior to becoming mayor, he had worked as a civil servant within local governments in North Sumatra for nearly 30 years. His tenure as mayor was cut short due to his involvement in a corruption case, and he was imprisoned until 2021.

== Early life and education ==
Harahap was born in the village of Gunung Tua, within Padang Lawas Regency of North Sumatra, on 21 January 1959. He completed his basic education in Padang Sidempuan by 1977, before going to Jakarta to study at the Governance Science Institute and graduating in 1989. Later on, he would also obtain a master's degree from the North Sumatra Islamic University.

== Career ==
By 1981, Harahap had passed the civil servant examination. After graduating from Jakarta, he was appointed district secretary in of West Siantar within Pematangsiantar, becoming the district chief by 1990. He was promoted to head the markets bureau by 1997 within the city, and then he moved to South Tapanuli Regency as head of the regency's revenues department. He also served as the regional secretary for Central Tapanuli Regency, before moving to the provincial government in the late 2000s.

=== Mayor of Medan ===
On 22 July 2009, Harahap was appointed as the acting mayor of Medan to replace Afifuddin Lubis. The following year, Harahap ran as mayor of Medan, as one of ten candidates in the race and Dzulmi Eldin as his running mate. The election system used is an absolute majority system meaning if a pair of candidates do not receive a majority of votes then a second round of voting will be organsied by the general election commission to achieve an election where a pair of candidates get over half of the vote. None of the ten candidates won over 30 per cent of votes, with Harahap and Dzulmi winning 21.2% of votes and advancing to runoffs. Harahap would win the runoff with 65.88% of votes. He was sworn in as mayor on 26 July 2010. In that election, some voters were motivated based on Ethnicity, as political party activists pointed out how voters tended to vote for candidates who shared the same ethnicity as them. This led to ethnic coalition-building, symbols and appeals, with campaigns appealing to the biggest ethnic groups in a particular locality if they wished to win office there, This is because of Medan having a diverse ethnic make up, and with 20 candidates coming from more than 10 ethnic groups, ethnicity had the capability to be a driving force behind voter behaviour. Religion also played a large part in the election especially in the second runnoff election. Rahudman Harahap was a Muslim, and being from the majority religious group in Medan, and his supporters urging Muslims to vote for him by framing the election as a contest between Muslims and Kafir. It can be seen as favoring Harahap, and undermining the campaigns of other candidates from minority religions, and theoes arguing for inclusivism and pluralism, therefore helping Harahap secure an electoral victory. During Harahap's tenure, he enforced regulations on the ban of animal husbandry within city limits and aquaculture ponds on the city's shoreline. The ban on animal husbandry in particular involved crackdowns on pig farms in the city, but after the crackdown faced significant local opposition, it was shelved.

In April 2013, Harahap was investigated for a corruption case dating to his time as regional secretary in Central Tapanuli. His position as mayor was nonactivated by Minister of Home Affairs Gamawan Fauzi on 10 May 2013. Harahap was sentenced to five years' prison for the case in 2014. While still in prison, Harahap was further sentenced to ten years prison in 2017 for the transfer of PT KAI-owned land in Medan during his tenure as mayor.

=== Post release ===
Harahap was released by order of the Supreme Court of Indonesia on 27 May 2021 following a judicial review of the KAI case, which found that while Harahap's allegations were proven, the allegations were not covered under criminal law and was a civil offence. After his release, Harahap joined the NasDem Party. He has also hosted podcasts, and unsuccessfully ran for a seat in the House of Representatives representing North Sumatra's 1st district in the 2024 Indonesian general election.

== Personal life ==
Harahap is married to Yusra Siregar and the couple has four children.
