= North Sumatra Regional House of Representatives =

Unicameral legislature of the Indonesian province of North Sumatra

North Sumatra Province Regional House of Representatives Dewan Perwakilan Rakyat Daerah Provinsi Sumatera Utara ᯑᯩᯋᯉ᯲ ᯇᯩᯒ᯲ᯋᯄ᯦ᯪᯞᯉ᯲ ᯒᯄ᯦᯲ᯛᯖ᯲ ᯑᯀᯩᯒᯂ᯲ ᯇ᯲ᯒᯬᯋᯪᯉ᯲ᯘᯪ ᯘᯮᯔᯖ᯲ᯒ ᯥᯖᯒ
- 2024–2029 Period
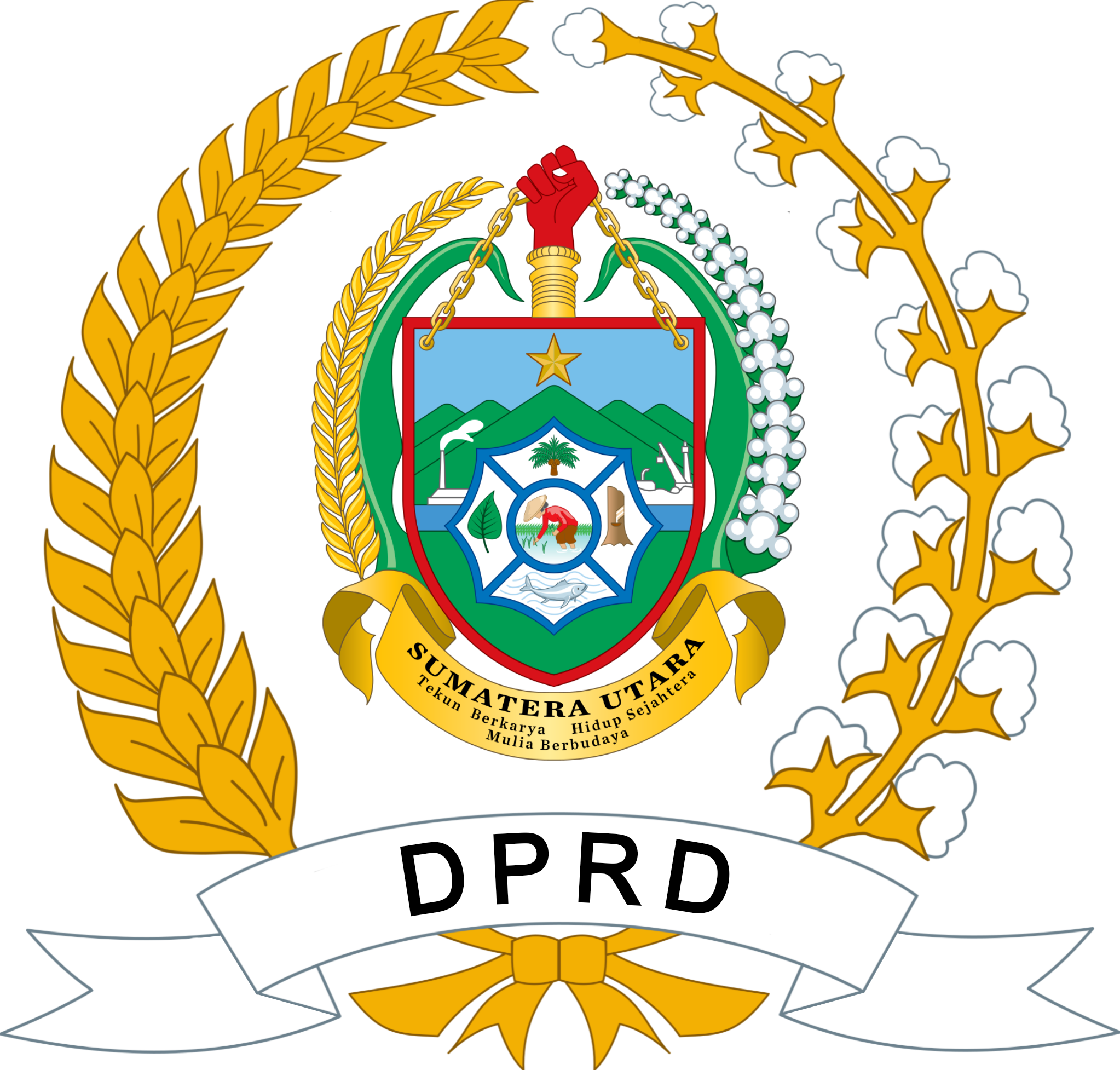

Type
- Type: Unicameral
- Term limits: 5 years

History
- New session started: 17 September 2024

Leadership
- Speaker: Erni Ariyanti Sitorus, Golkar since 31 January 2025
- Deputy Speaker: Sutarto, PDI-P since 20 November 2024
- Deputy Speaker: Ihwan Ritonga, Gerindra since 20 November 2024
- Deputy Speaker: Ricky Anthony, NasDem; Salman Alfarisi, PKS since 20 November 2024

Structure
- Seats: 65
- Political groups: Government (74): Golkar (22); Gerindra (13); NasDem (12); PKS (10); PAN (6); Democratic (5); PKB (4); PPP (1); Perindo (1); Opposition (26): PDI-P (21); Hanura (5)
- Length of term: 5 years

Elections
- Voting system: Open listproportional representation
- Last general election: 14 February 2024
- Next general election: 2029

Meeting place
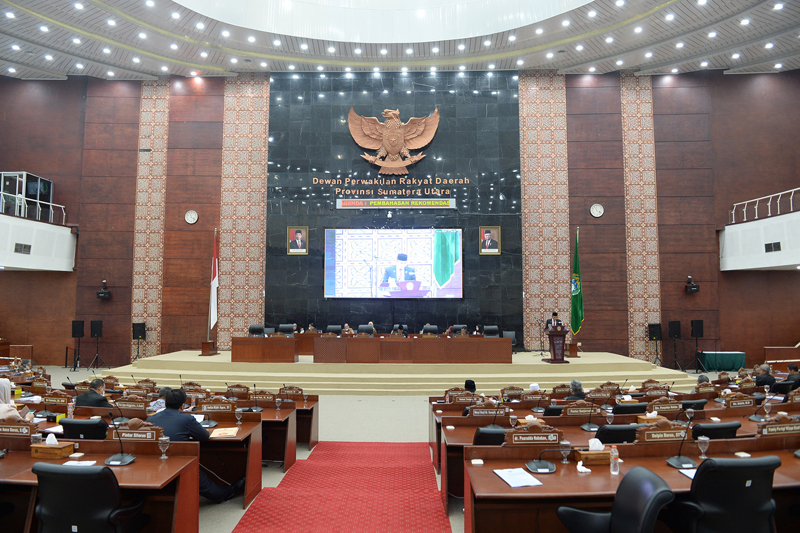
- North Sumatra DPRD meeting Medan, North Sumatra, Indonesia

Website
- http://dprd.sumutprov.go.id

The North Sumatra Regional House of Representatives (Indonesian: Dewan Perwakilan Rakyat Daerah Provinsi Sumatra Utara, Batak: ᯑᯩᯋᯉ᯲ ᯇᯩᯒ᯲ᯋᯄ᯦ᯪᯞᯉ᯲ ᯒᯄ᯦᯲ᯛᯖ᯲ ᯑᯀᯩᯒᯂ᯲ ᯇ᯲ᯒᯬᯋᯪᯉ᯲ᯘᯪ ᯘᯮᯔᯖ᯲ᯒ ᯥᯖᯒ, abbreviated as DPRD Sumut) is the unicameral legislative body within the regional government of the Indonesian province of North Sumatra. The house is composed of 100 members elected via party lists in the 2024 general election.

== History ==
The province of North Sumatra was first established on 15 April 1948 under Law No. 10 of 1948. At the time, the province encompassed the Residencies of Aceh, East Sumatra, and North Tapanuli.

The establishment of North Sumatra as a province is commemorated based on Regional People’s Representative Council (DPRD) Decision No. 19 of 1973, dated 13 August, which designates that date as the province’s anniversary.

Earlier, according to the decree of the Preparatory Committee for Indonesian Independence (PPKI) dated 19 August 1945, North Sumatra functioned as a province and administrative region. Similar to developments in Java, Regional National Committees (Komite Nasional Daerah) were gradually formed, regulated by a proclamation issued by the Governor of North Sumatra on 12 April 1946 (No. 2/MGS), in accordance with Law No. 1 of 1945.

The proclamation stipulated that Regional National Committees were to be established at the provincial and residency levels, effectively transforming these areas into autonomous cities. Each region had its own representative council responsible for local governance.

The DPRD instituted an executive body consisting of five council members tasked with managing day-to-day administration, with the regional head serving as chair as well as member. Under this proclamation, the Regional People’s Representative Council of North Sumatra consisted of 100 members, representing a population of 100,000 residents.

== General election results ==
=== 2024 Indonesian legislative election ===
The valid votes obtained by political parties participating in the 2024 legislative election from each electoral district/constituency (Dapil) for the Regional House of Representatives of North Sumatra Province are as follows.

Electoral district	PKB	Gerindra	PDI–P	Golkar	NasDem	Labour	Gelora	PKS	PKN	Hanura	Garuda	PAN	PBB	Democrats	PSI	Perindo	PPP	Ummat	Total valid votes
North Sumatra 1	20,844	84,847	126,242	107,702	48,950	4,055	5,587	124,712	2,566	18,071	1,452	56,643	1,352	61,378	19,252	5,274	8,174	6,473	703,574
North Sumatra 2	10,154	67,502	76,106	75,381	37,869	4,545	2,115	93,328	1,379	2,192	907	16,968	1,107	16,437	23,382	19,047	7,065	4,418	459,902
North Sumatra 3	46,827	166,846	123,371	122,355	69,411	8,751	11,896	112,403	1,311	39,264	3,360	53,300	6,933	95,403	26,531	20,905	31,006	8,010	947,883
North Sumatra 4	44,240	44,298	100,102	65,081	18,012	1,654	8,079	34,963	271	6,129	619	10,838	433	33,167	3,274	6,703	35,685	288	413,836
North Sumatra 5	26,768	89,007	121,248	105,273	41,107	2,988	5,738	78,818	642	36,581	1,039	52,043	2,137	59,839	4,702	1,860	23,404	1,635	654,829
North Sumatra 6	47,043	52,869	115,681	145,292	74,582	4,784	3,911	40,366	764	44,419	652	32,012	1,203	15,414	3,382	5,675	13,060	1,505	602,614
North Sumatra 7	66,910	80,937	74,265	190,373	89,862	3,976	3,793	95,825	1,712	29,243	1,946	60,068	1,652	67,477	3,862	3,413	32,594	2,398	810,306
North Sumatra 8	8,820	47,433	93,068	48,161	42,844	2,149	2,741	2,708	1,241	34,181	791	41,092	291	32,181	5,592	5,502	196	143	369,134
North Sumatra 9	34,169	73,613	177,996	117,194	95,209	4,270	4,786	12,081	3,344	40,979	1,636	4,979	721	19,105	8,969	70,437	587	239	670,314
North Sumatra 10	12,004	94,687	107,947	168,481	66,176	5,757	5,269	41,496	938	32,983	807	16,568	1,300	30,416	20,045	9,194	4,121	607	618,796
North Sumatra 11	9,728	43,201	151,035	108,200	57,003	1,776	2,337	10,251	451	12,329	422	6,795	363	5,141	7,528	1,855	352	113	418,880
North Sumatra 12	26,333	82,040	83,951	123,973	82,350	2,865	19,754	73,706	758	4,592	1,417	72,633	4,436	61,080	7,253	2,650	27,404	4,126	681,321
Total	353,840	927,280	1,351,012	1,377,466	723,375	47,570	76,006	720,657	15,377	300,963	15,048	423,939	21,928	497,038	133,772	152,515	183,648	29,955	7,351,389
Source: General Elections Commission of the Republic of Indonesia (KPU).

== Composition ==
The following is the party composition of the Regional House of Representatives of North Sumatra (DPRD Sumatera Utara) for the last three legislative periods.

Political party	Seats by term		
Political party	2014–2019	2019–2024	2024–2029
National Awakening Party (PKB)	3	2 ↓	4 ↑
Gerindra Party	13	15 ↑	13 ↓
Indonesian Democratic Party of Struggle (PDI–P)	16	19 ↑	21 ↑
Golkar Party	17	15 ↓	22 ↑
NasDem Party	5	12 ↑	12 →
Prosperous Justice Party (PKS)	9	11 ↑	10 ↓
Hanura Party	10	6 ↓	5 ↓
National Mandate Party (PAN)	6	8 ↑	6 ↓
Democratic Party	14	9 ↓	5 ↓
Perindo Party	—	1 (new)	1 →
United Development Party (PPP)	4	2 ↓	1 ↓
Indonesian Justice and Unity Party (PKPI)	3	0 ↓	—
Total seats	100	100	100
Number of parties	11	11	11

== Parliamentary groups (Factions) ==
In the North Sumatra Regional House of Representatives, factions (fraksi) serve as the formal groups through which members organize legislative work, exercise oversight, and coordinate political positions. Each faction must have at least five members, in accordance with Indonesian law.

The table below summarizes the number of factions in the last four legislative periods.

Legislative term	Full factions	Joint factions	Total
2009–2014	8	2	10
2014–2019	6	1	7
2019–2024	8	1	9
2024–2029	7	2	9

=== 2009–2014 ===
The DPRD for the 2009–2014 term consisted of ten factions representing fifteen political parties.

Faction	Member parties	Seats
Democratic Party faction	Democratic Party; Indonesian Democratic Party of Unity	28
Golkar faction	Golkar Party	12
Indonesian Democratic Party of Struggle faction	PDI–P; PPIB	13
Prosperous Justice Party faction	PKS	12
National Mandate Party faction	PAN	7
United Development Party faction	PPP; PKB	8
Christian Democratic Party faction	PDS	5
Hanura faction	Hanura Party	5
PPRN faction	PPRN; Pelopor Party	5
GBBR faction	Gerindra; Crescent Star Party; Reform Star Party	5

=== 2014–2019 ===
The 2014–2019 DPRD consisted of seven factions representing eleven political parties.

Faction	Member parties	Seats
Golkar faction	Golkar Party	17
Indonesian Democratic Party of Struggle faction	PDI–P	13
Democratic Party faction	Democratic Party	14
Gerindra faction	Gerindra Party	13
Hanura faction	Hanura Party	11
Prosperous Justice Party faction	PKS	9
National Mandate Party faction	PAN	6
NasDem faction	NasDem Party	5
Unity and Justice faction	PPP; PKB; PKPI	10

=== 2024–2029 ===
The 2024–2029 DPRD consists of nine factions representing eleven political parties.

Faction	Member parties	Seats
Golkar faction	Golkar Party	22
Indonesian Democratic Party of Struggle faction	PDI–P	21
Gerindra faction	Gerindra Party	13
NasDem faction	NasDem Party	12
Prosperous Justice Party faction	PKS	10
National Mandate Party faction	PAN	6
Democratic–United Development faction	Democratic Party; PPP	6
Hanura faction	Hanura Party	5
National Awakening–Perindo faction	PKB; Perindo Party	5

== Electoral districts/constituencies ==
In the 2019 Legislative Election and the 2024 Legislative Election, the election for the North Sumatra Provincial DPRD is divided into 12 electoral districts as follows:

Electoral District Name	Electoral District Area	Number of Seats
NORTH SUMATRA 1	Medan City A (Medan Kota, Medan Denai, Medan Deli, Medan Belawan, Medan Amplas, Medan Area, Medan Marelan, Medan Labuhan, Medan Tembung, Medan Perjuangan, Medan Timur)	10
NORTH SUMATRA 2	Medan City B (Medan Sunggal, Medan Helvetia, Medan Barat, Medan Tuntungan, Medan Johor, Medan Maimun, Medan Polonia, Medan Baru, Medan Petisah, Medan Selayang)	7
NORTH SUMATRA 3	Deli Serdang Regency	12
NORTH SUMATRA 4	Serdang Bedagai Regency, Tebing Tinggi City	5
NORTH SUMATRA 5	Asahan Regency, Batu Bara Regency, Tanjungbalai City	10
NORTH SUMATRA 6	Labuhanbatu Regency, Labuhanbatu Utara Regency, Labuhanbatu Selatan Regency	8
NORTH SUMATRA 7	South Tapanuli Regency, Mandailing Natal Regency, North Padang Lawas Regency, Padang Lawas Regency, Padang Sidempuan City	10
NORTH SUMATRA 8	Nias Regency, South Nias Regency, North Nias Regency, West Nias Regency, Gunungsitoli City	6
NORTH SUMATRA 9	Central Tapanuli Regency, North Tapanuli Regency, Toba Regency, Humbang Hasundutan Regency, Samosir Regency, Sibolga City	9
NORTH SUMATRA 10	Simalungun Regency, Pematangsiantar City	8
NORTH SUMATRA 11	Karo Regency, Dairi Regency, Pakpak Bharat Regency	5
NORTH SUMATRA 12	Langkat Regency, Binjai City	10
TOTAL		100

== Composition ==
Political party	Total seats in period		
Political party	2014–2019	2019–2024	2024–2029
PKB	3	▼2	▲4
Gerindra	13	▲15	▼13
PDI-P	16	▲19	▲21
Golkar	17	▼15	▲22
NasDem	5	▲12	12
PKS	9	▲11	▼10
Hanura	10	▼6	▼5
PAN	6	▲8	▼6
Democratic	14	▼9	▼5
Perindo		1	1
PPP	4	▼2	▼1
PKPI	3	▼0	
Seats total	100	100	100
Party total	11	11	11

== Speakers ==
Legislative period	Name	Party
2004–2008	Abdul Wahab Dalimunthe	Golkar
2008–2009	Abdul Aziz Angkat	Golkar
2009	Darmataksiah YWR	Demokrat
2009–2014	Saleh Bangun	Demokrat
2014–2016	Ajib Sjah	Golkar
2016–2019	Wagirin Arman	Golkar
2019–2024	Baskami Ginting	PDI-P
2024	Sutarto	PDI-P
2024–2029	Erni Ariyanti Sitorus	Golkar
