= Bobby Nasution =

Indonesian businessman and politician (born 1991)

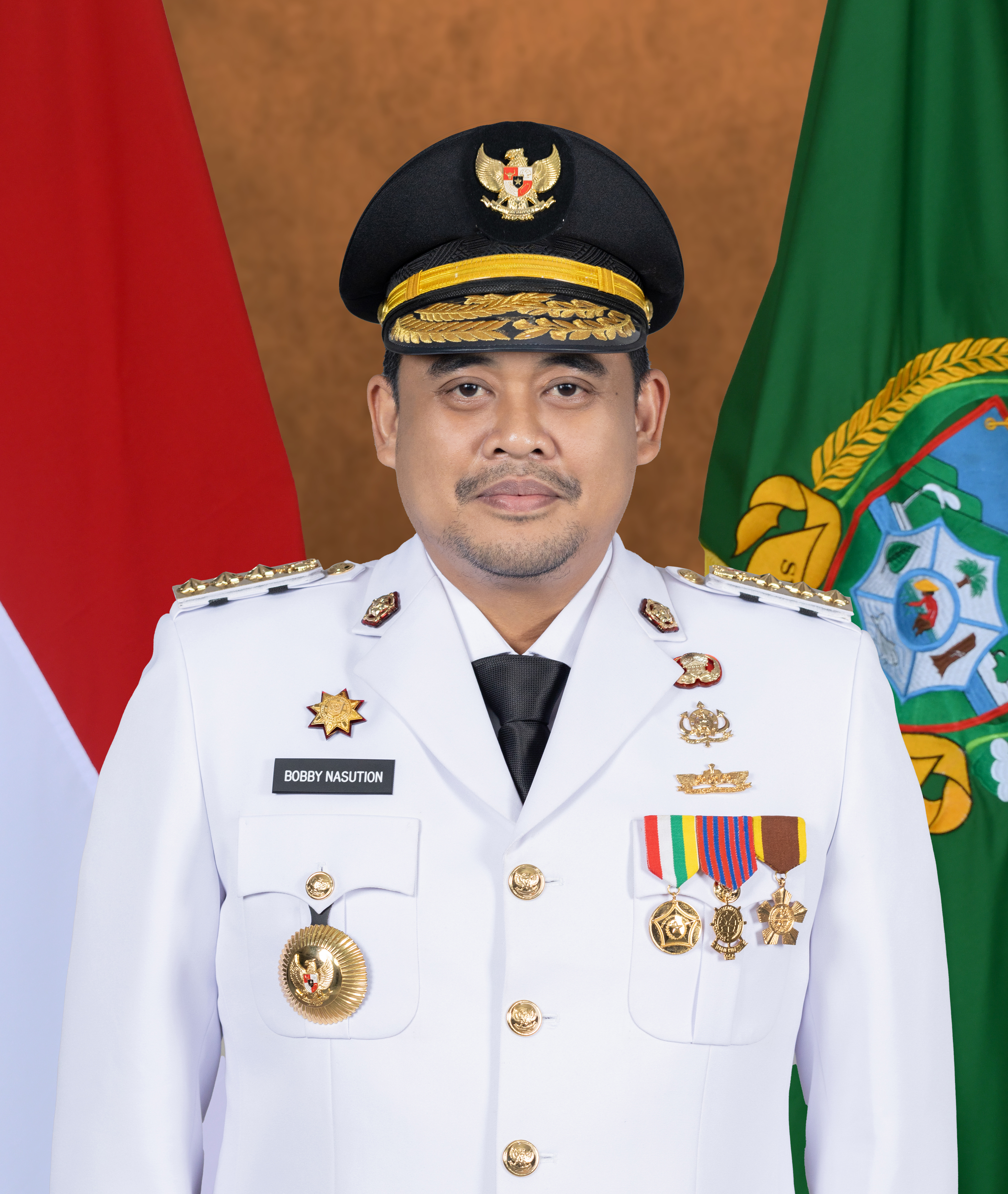
- Official portrait, 2025

19th Governor of North Sumatra
- Incumbent
- Assumed office 20 February 2025
- Vice Governor: Surya
- Preceded by: Edy Rahmayadi; Hassanudin (acting)

18th Mayor of Medan
- In office 26 February 2021 – 20 February 2025
- Vice Mayor: Aulia Rachman
- Preceded by: Akhyar Nasution
- Succeeded by: Rico Waas

Personal details
- Born: 5 July 1991 (age 35) Medan, North Sumatra, Indonesia
- Party: Gerindra (from 2024)
- Other political affiliations: PDI-P (2020–2023)
- Spouse: Kahiyang Ayu (m. 2017)
- Relations: Family of Joko Widodo
- Children: 3
- Education: Bogor Agricultural Institute

Muhammad Bobby Afif Nasution (born 5 July 1991) is an Indonesian businessman and politician who is currently serving as the 19th governor of North Sumatra since 2025. He previously served as the 18th mayor of Medan from 2021 to 2025. He is the son-in-law of former President Joko Widodo.

== Early life and career ==
Bobby was born on 5 July 1991 in Medan, North Sumatra. He was the youngest of three siblings in a Mandailing Batak family. His father, Erwin Nasution, was the president and director of the state-owned plantation company Perkebunan Nusantara IV. He received his primary education in Pontianak, West Kalimantan, before going to middle and high school in Bandar Lampung. Bobby then studied agribusiness in university, graduating with a bachelor's and master's degrees from the Bogor Agricultural Institute.

After graduating, Bobby began working in real estate in 2011. He began renovating and reselling homes, and became involved in the Malioboro City project in Yogyakarta. In 2014, he briefly worked as a manager for the football club Medan Jaya. Two years later, in 2016, he joined the Takke Group—a real estate company—and became its marketing director. He also held shares in the company.

== Political career ==
=== Mayor of Medan ===
Bobby submitted a bid to run as a mayoral candidate for his hometown of Medan in the 2020 Indonesian local elections through Jokowi's political party PDI-P. This caused multiple observers to suggest that a political dynasty was being established, which Bobby denied. In the ensuing months, he visited Gerindra chairman Prabowo Subianto and National Mandate Party chairman Zulkifli Hasan to gather support for his candidacy, in addition to registering with Golkar. He had officially become a cadre of PDI-P in March 2020. He was elected Mayor of Medan in December 2020, after winning 54.5% of the votes and defeating incumbent mayor Akhyar Nasution.

In November 2023, Bobby was expelled from PDI-P due to his endorsement of Prabowo Subianto in the 2024 Indonesian presidential election. In May 2024, Bobby ordered a shopping mall in Medan to be closed, citing unpaid municipal taxes since 2011 amounting to Rp 250 billion (USD 16 million). Also in May 2024, he joined the Gerindra Party.

=== Governor of North Sumatra ===
Supported by the Advanced Indonesia Coalition, Bobby ran for the governorship of North Sumatra in 2024, with Surya as his running mate. He then went on to win the election, receiving 3,645,611 votes (64.47% of the votes).

== Personal life ==
While studying for his master's degree in Bogor, Bobby met Kahiyang Ayu (born 20 April 1992), the only daughter of 7th Indonesian president, Joko Widodo (Jokowi). They dated for around a year after they met in 2015, and the two married in November 2017, through a ceremony in Jokowi's hometown of Surakarta which was attended by some 7,000 live guests and watched by millions of people. In March 2024, Bobby was given the adat title of Sutan Porang Gunung Baringin Naposo by the local rajas of southern Tapanuli.
