= Hirohara Shrine =

Shinto Shrine in Medan, Indonesia

- 紘原神社 (Hirohara Jinja)
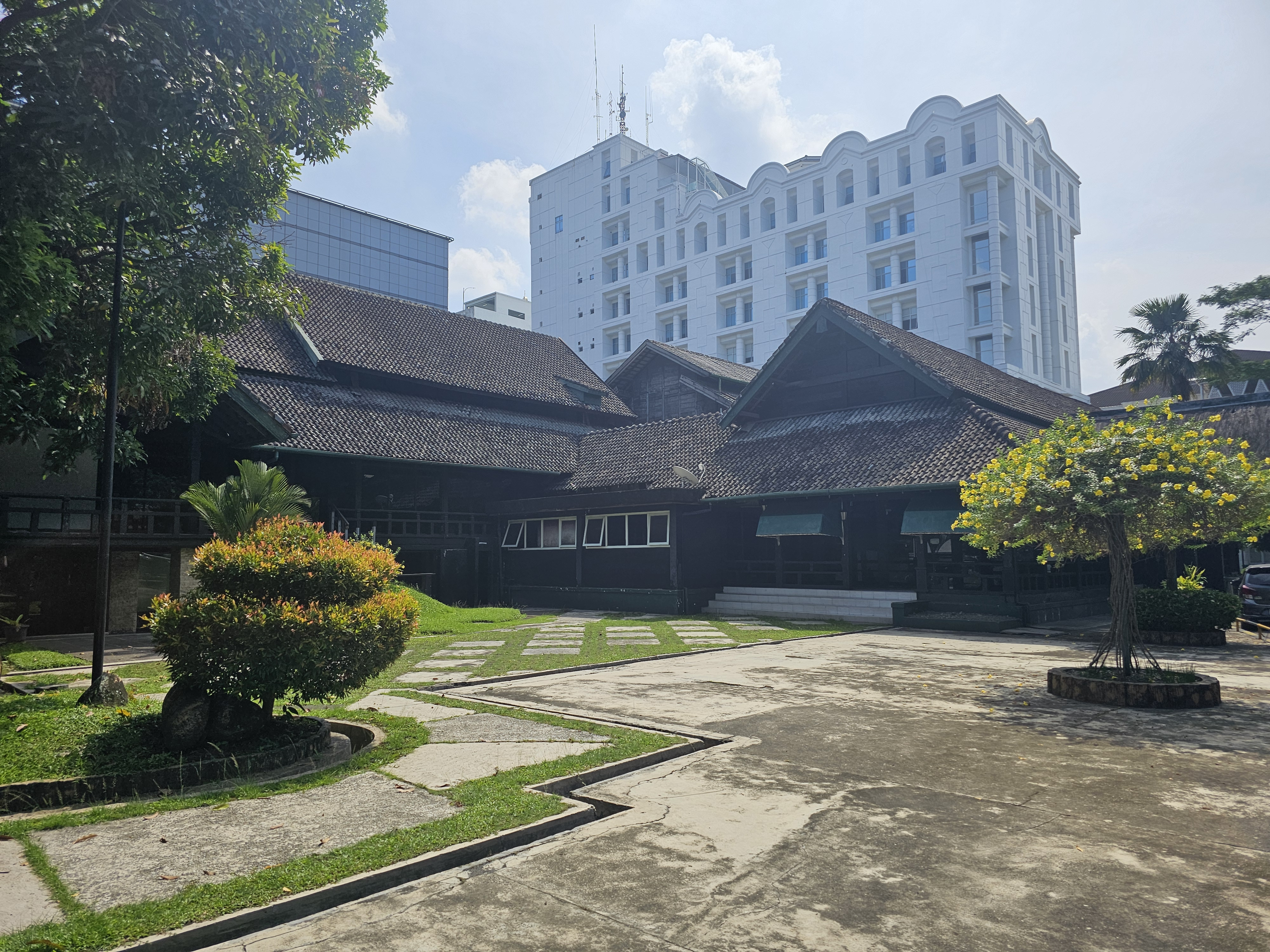
- Hirohara shrine in 2024

Religion
- Affiliation: Shinto
- Sect: Jingūkyō
- Deity: Amaterasu
- Festival: Taishō Hōtai no Hi (大詔奉戴日) (8th of every month)
- Ownership: North Sumatra Provincial Government
- Year consecrated: August 11, 1944

Location
- Location: Jalan R.A. Kartini No.36, Madras Hulu, Medan Polonia, Medan, North Sumatera, Indonesia
- Interactive map of Hirohara Shrine
- Coordinates: 3°34′49.607″N 98°40′15.545″E

Architecture
- Architect: Suzuki Hiroyuki
- Established: 1905 (Note: First iteration)
- Groundbreaking: 1 April 1943
- Completed: 4 July 1944
- Site area: 148.500 m²

Hirohara Jinja (紘原神社, Hirohara Jinja; lit. "Hirohara Shrine" or "Kuil Hirohara" in Indonesian) is a former Shinto shrine located in Medan, Indonesia. The shrine was built in 1944 by the 2nd Guards Division of the former Imperial Japanese Army. It is situated slightly inland from the North Sumatra Governor's Office, formerly known as the East Coast Provincial Office during the Japanese occupation of Indonesia.

The shrine is believed to be one of the last remaining surviving shrine building among those built by the former Japanese Imperial Army in various parts of the Greater East Asia Co-prosperity Sphere. The shrine remained after the war and is then used as a meeting place for the local rich as the Medan Club. The building was designated as a heritage site and protected by the Medan city Government, though the future of the site is uncertain.

== Name ==
The 'Hiro' (紘) in Hirohara was taken from the Greater East Asia War principle 'Hakkō ichiu' (八紘一宇), and the 'Hara' (原) was named after the Indonesian word 'Medan' (field). Another possible meaning of "Hiro" is wide or expansive.

== History ==
Medan had a sparse population nor had a rapid development until the middle of the Meiji era, when the Dutch rulers began to release land for tobacco plantations. This shift in land use facilitated Medan's evolution into a prominent trading hub, subsequently elevating its status to a governmental center. Soon word began to spread over the burgeoning prosperity of the city, attracting a wave of migrant laborers, notably from the Japanese community. Due to this, Medan has been a center of Japanese migration to Indonesia outside of Batavia. Dutch consulate reports indicate that there were 782 registered Japanese migrants in Batavia in 1909 (with an estimated 400 more yet to register), and an additional 278 (comprising 57 men and 221 women) in Medan by 1910. Renowned poet Mitsuharu Kaneko, once also stayed at an inn in Medan's Indian quarter, Kampung Keling, during his travels to the Dutch East Indies in the early Showa period. Stating that there were more than 40 Japanese-run inns in the new town alone. The oldest foreign-owned hotel not belonging to the Dutch was the 'India Hotel', owned by a Japanese person (1887), located on Perdana Street (now the office of Notary Pane St. Paruhum). Japanese laborers then became entrepreneurs, some even plantation owners themselves.

According to local accounts in Medan, preceding the establishment of the Hirohara Shrine at its current site, there existed a precursor Japanese shrine. Historian, Ichwan Azhari, explained that due to the influx of Japanese laborers to Medan, who were at the time recorded majority as adhering to Japanese Buddhism, it necessitated a designated place of worship for the growing community. Thus leading to the creation of the first iteration of the shrine. According to the last head of the Medan Club, Eswin Soekardja, the shrine was made after when Japanese laborers entered and settled in Medan.

According to historian, Tengku Luckman Sinar, the Japanese shrine was originally situated on the left side of what was now the G.P.C. Khalsa High School in Kampung Keling. However, on the eve of the Second World War, the land encompassing both the shrine and a former Japanese school located on the site was purchased by the local Sikh community.

=== Japanese invasion ===
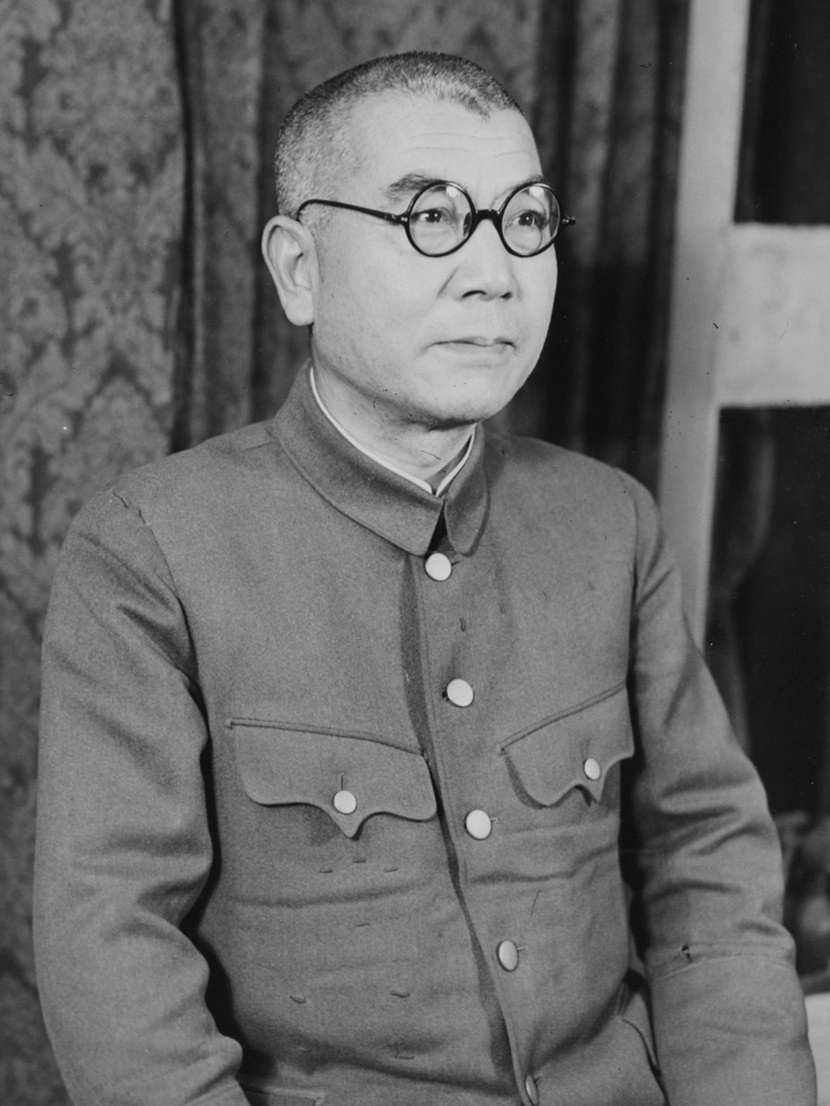
Akira Mutō, Division Commander of the 2nd Guards Division greenlit the project

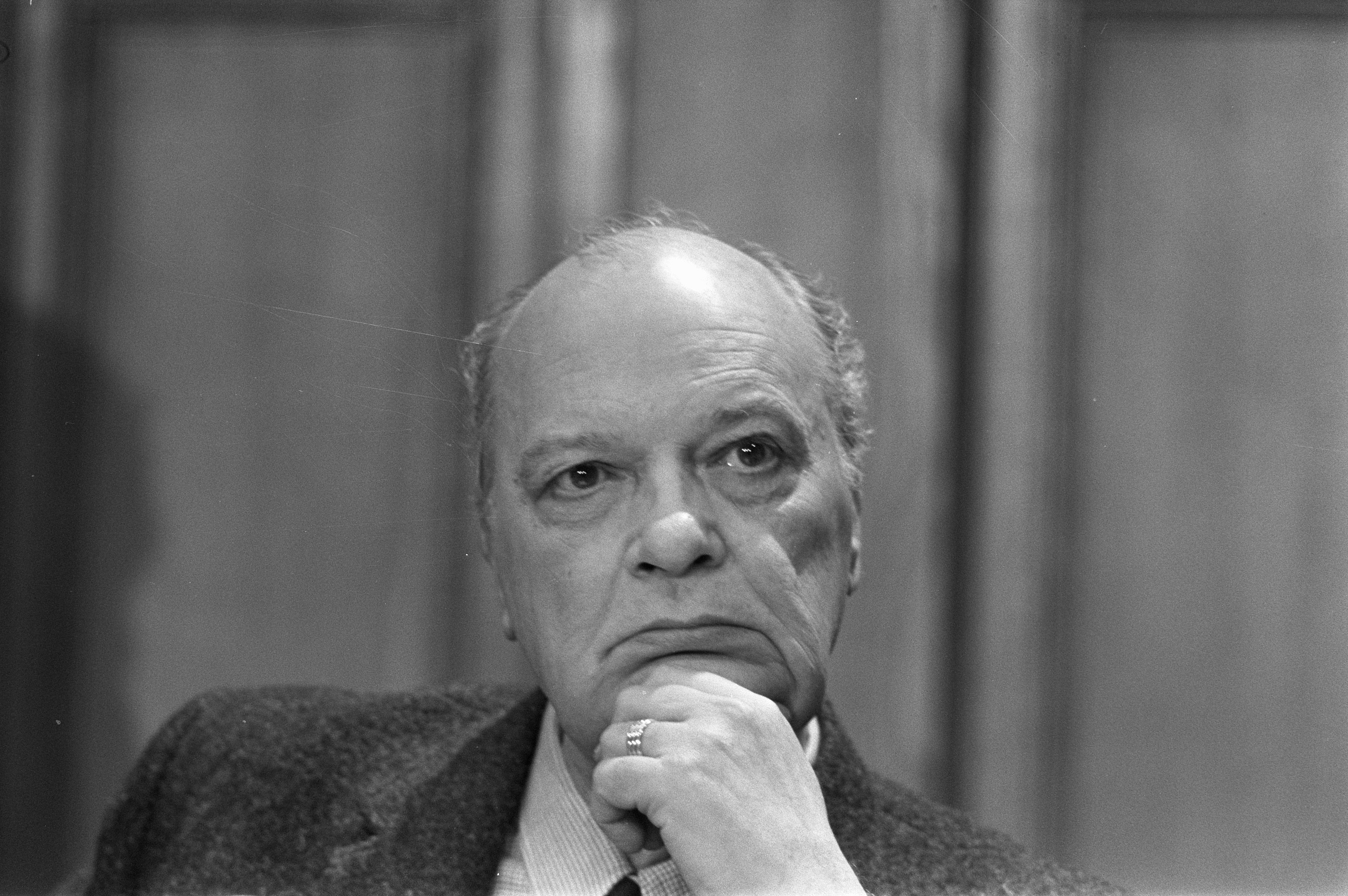
Dutch novelist and poet Willem Brandt was among the Dutch prisoners of war interned in East Sumatra who were forced to work on the shrine.

After the Fall of Singapore and the Invasion of Sumatra, on 1 June 1943, the 2nd Guards Division made the Medan area of Sumatra, Dutch East Indies (present-day Indonesia) as their base of operations in Southeast Asia. During the war, shrines were erected across occupied territories as places of prayer for victory and enhanced morale, in Indonesia alone there were 11 shrines. Following this, Mutō then initiated the construction of a shrine of his own on the land. The Japanese administration established a specialized shrine known as a Ginsai at the site of the present-day Medan Club. The building that housed the shrine had previously served as the office of the Deli Planters Vereeniging (D.P.V.). The grounds of the former D.P.V. office extended to the area behind what is now the Governor's Office, while its experimental plantation (proeftuin) was located on the site currently occupied by the Office of the Finance Department.

According to Prof. Nakajima Michio (Former Rector of Kanagawa University), the building was designed by Suzuki Hiroyuki, an architect from Japan's Imperial Household Ministry. The construction of Hirohara Shrine was ordered by the Japanese army, in co-operation with the Japanese private sector. By the request of Viscount Kuroda Nagaatsu, then as the head of the Imperial Household Ministry's Daizen office, Suzuki Hiroyuki became notable for his work in compiling he deities associated with the ōi (大炊). His shrine architectural work includes the founding of Kenmu Shrine (建武神社) in Tokyo and several temple buildings. While working as an architect, he also studied Shinto and its forms of worship under the personal supervision of a chief priest from the Suwa clan at the Shiba Shinmei Shrine (now known as Shiba Daijingu; 芝大神宮) in Tokyo. Whilst his academic studies on Ko-Shintō was by Dr. Katsuhiko Kakei, Professor Emeritus of the University of Tokyo.

Based on this background, Suzuki Hiroyuki was entrusted with the position of Chief Construction Engineer in charge of both Army special missions and concurrently as the chief shrine priest (gūji) under a special army appointment in Medan. He was thus granted valuable experience in conducting various ritual-style ceremonies alongside the large-scale construction of shrine pavilions.

It is said that the wood used for the shrine was a “sacred tree” from deep within the Aceh mountains, supplied by the Showa Rubber branch in Medan during the military occupation, and that Dutch prisoners of war and rōmusha's were employed in its construction, making it possibly one of the only shrines built by Christians. One of them was Dutch poet and writer, Willem Brandt. In his work, De gele terreur in 1946, he once described the condition:

"Everything is Japanified, — Has Sumatra not become part of Japan? The avenues and streets bear unpronounceable Japanese names. Prisoners of war were put to work in the experimental garden of the Deli Proefstation to dig a lotus pond, to lay out a Japanese park, with terraces and a temple..."

During the war, ceremonies were held at the Hirohara Shrine on the 1st and 15th of every month, with the 8th day designated for the Taishō Hōtai no Hi (Japanese: 大詔奉戴日, lit. 'Day of Reverently Upholding the Great Imperial Rescript.'), commemorating Japan's declaration of war on the United States and the British Empire. Military personnel would visit to pray for victory, subsequently worshipping the Miyagi Yōhai (Japanese: 宮城遥拝), a practice of bowing to the general direction of the Japanese imperial family (Miyagi) from afar. This practice seemed peculiar to the predominantly Muslim population of Medan, who pray towards Mecca (Kiblat) five times daily. During the occupation, some Japanese soldiers compelled residents, even foreigners in POW camps, to worship the Japanese imperial family from a distance, causing friction as doing Miyagi Yōhai is eastward, the exact opposite direction of Mecca in the west. Although the basics of Islam were initially taught to the top executives of Japan's military government, this education was not thoroughly implemented, leading to issues.

Shizuo Saito, a former ambassador to Indonesia and Australia and a military administrator for the former Japanese Army (part of the Gunseikanbu Somubu) during the war, cited in his writings; the "systematization of hair cutting," the "forced use of the Japanese language," and the "compulsory worship toward the Imperial Palace" as concrete examples of the Japanese military administration's ill repute. He stated that the locals were encouraged to visit the shrine and were made to worship east. Despite the destruction of these shrines by the Japanese army and locals at the end of the war, the Hirohara Shrine inexplicably remained intact. Given the limited construction during the three-year Japanese occupation of Indonesia, the Hirohara Shrine is considered a significant historical structure.

=== Medan club ===
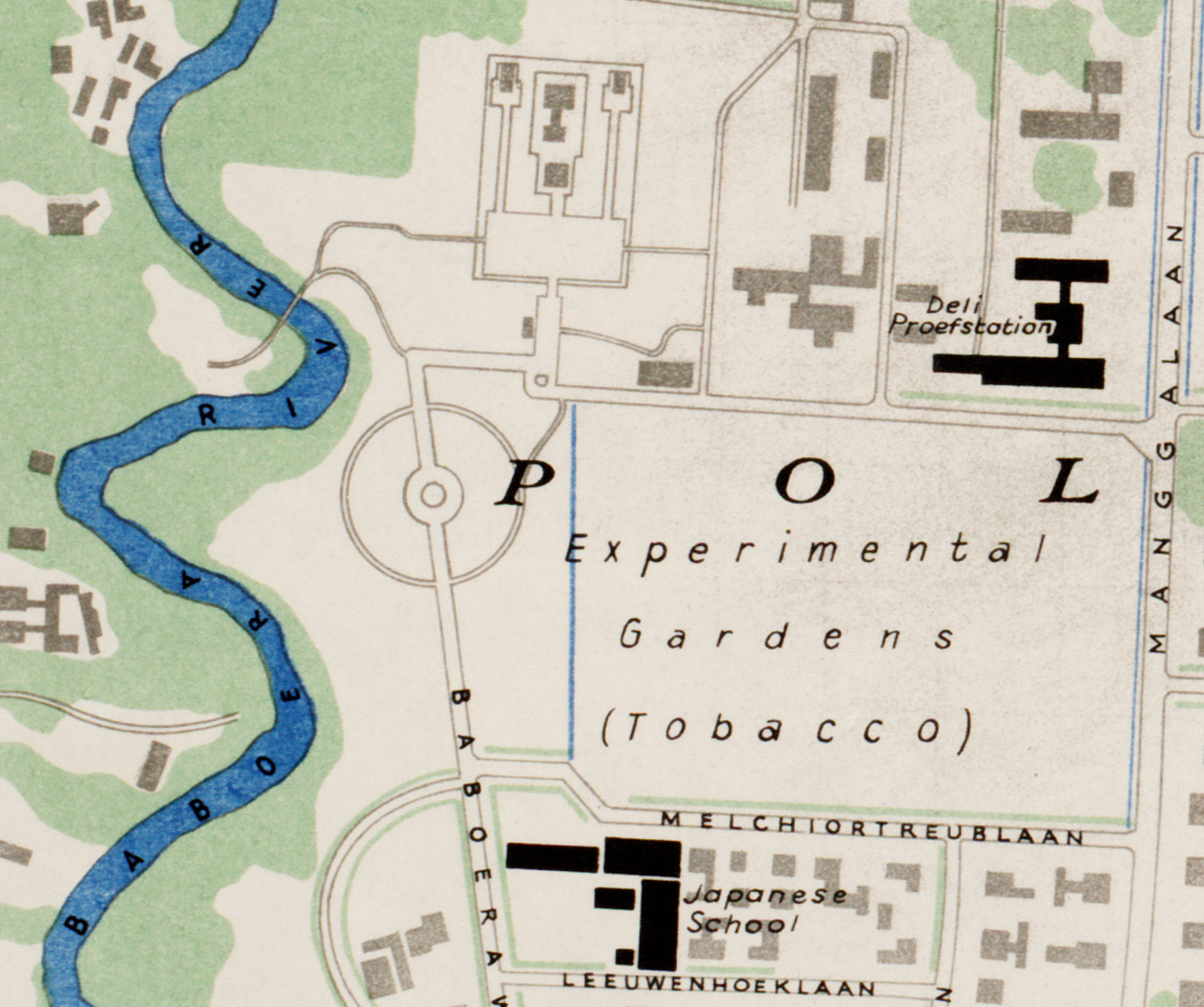
Outline of Hirohara shrine prior to its dismantling (1945)

In the aftermath of Japan's surrender, an attempt was made to dismantle the shrine from 26 August to 31 August 1945 under the orders from the Home Ministry, as to avoid the desecration of the shrine. The dismantling of the shrine was underway when it was supervised by Suzuki Hiroyuki himself, who stayed in Medan along the course of the war. Both the honden and haiden, and other small shrines on the site, were successfully dismantled. The process was abruptly ended when British forces immediately began landing at Belawan on 9 October and blitzed their way to the city of Medan, facing little to no resistance and denying any movement for the Japanese to properly undertake any decisive actions. Medanese locals had also opposed the destruction of the shrine, which slowed progress by the Japanese Army. As a result, most infrastructure and buildings in Medan, including the shamusho, remained relatively intact. In the next year, Suzuki Hiroyuki went back to Japan. During the occupation of the city of Medan by the Allies, the building was repurposed as a Dutch white supremacist clubhouse known as De Witte Sociëteit (English: The White Society.) De Witte Sociëteit was established in 1879, serving as a gathering place for the white, Dutch Totoks, Chinese, high-ranking land owners of Deli, and the Sultan of Deli himself; no Inlander and dogs would be allowed in. Their first clubhouse was located adjacent to the main post office of Medan (now the Bank BCA). The Club House was initially conceived as a convivial space for Dutch plantation owners where they could assemble for recreational activities. This encompassed partaking in beverages such as coffee, engaging in smoking, and participating in discussions from literature and business to politics, art, and culture.

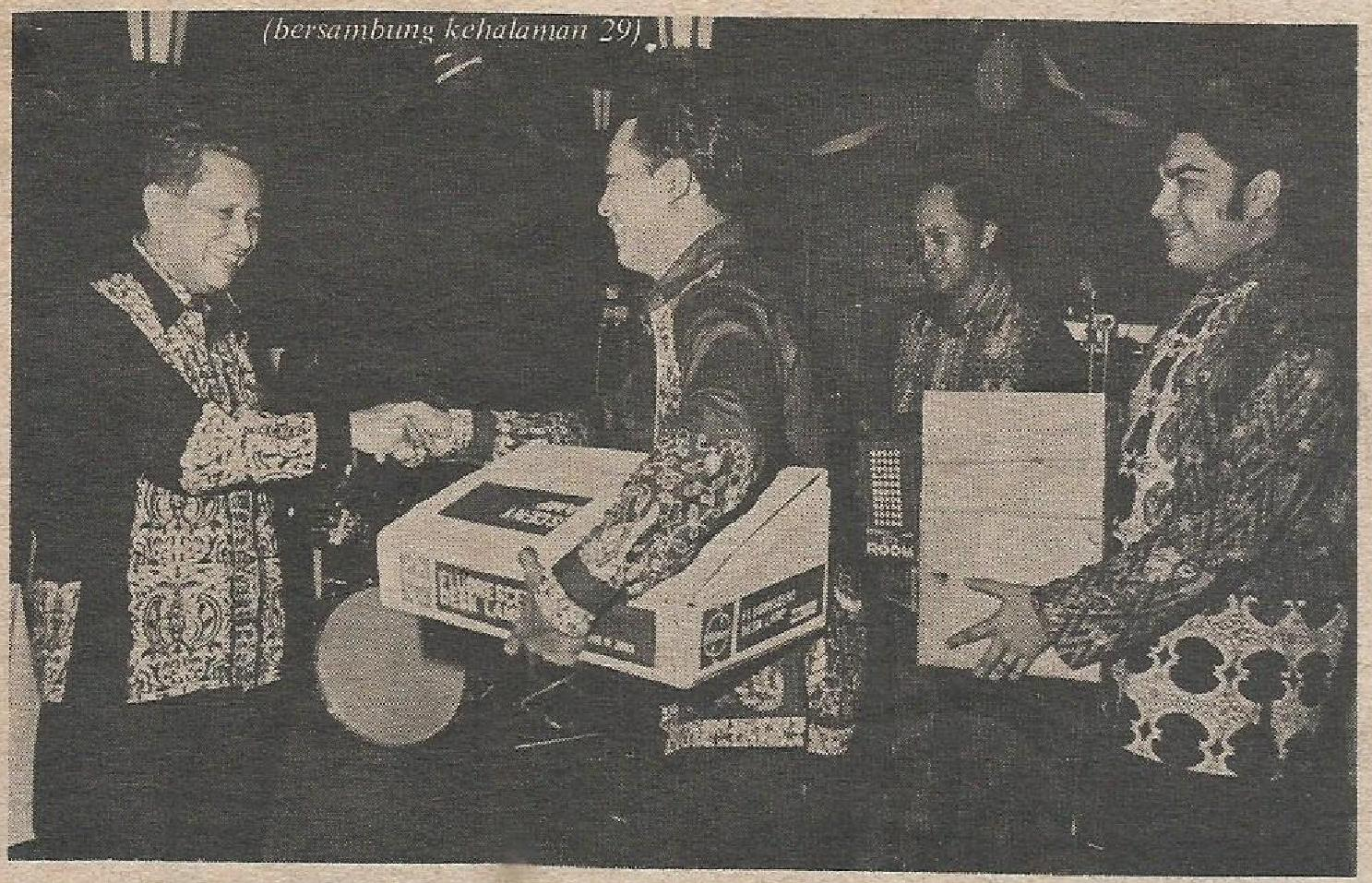
Medan club in 1972, used as a competition venue. Dr. Hidayat, the co-owner of the Medan Club at this time, is on the left.

Following the departure of the Dutch from Indonesia, former military members Dr. Soekarja, Dr. Hariono, and Dr. Ibrahim Irsan took over this clubhouse building and renamed it "Medan Club". The Medan Club was an exclusive establishment for the upper echelons of Medan society. Membership is required to access the Medan Club's facilities. During the 1980s, the Medan Club building underwent extensive renovations aimed at preserving its original structure and architectural features. The renovation was intended to ensure the longevity of the building, which at the time was over 80 years old, while also adapting it to remain relevant in the modern era after the reutilisation of the building from a shrine to a clubhouse. The Medan Club foundation, a foundation formerly owned by 150-200 members, that runs the operation, administration and upkeep of the former shrine, claims financial difficulties, with income derived only from monthly member fees and high operational costs. This led the delinquent absence in paying property tax since 2009, with a total debt of Rp.964,154,774, including late payment fines. The Medan Revenue Service has sent four tax invoices since 2013 and had plans to issue another one later.

Amids financial difficulties, in 2018, the owners of the Medan Club opened the Medan Club to the public and turned the Medan club from an exclusive members only club into a high-end restaurant and meeting venue. Using this option, on August 6, 2018, a seminar was held by the Consulate-General of Japan in Medan at the Medan Club, featuring various dignitaries as speakers to commemorate 60 years of diplomatic relations between Japan and Indonesia. Attendants included university representatives, Japanese-Indonesia associations, Toyohashi city mayor Koichi Sahara, DPR-RI Senator Parlindungan Purba, and others. The celebration included cultural promotions such as Shodō, Sadō, Furoshiki Wrapping, as well as performance arts such as Yosakoi dance and karate.

A year later, the owners then intended to retool the club into a 'night life' entertainment club. The sudden retooling brought scrutiny as the Medan club has not obtained the necessary business license for operating as a night entertainment venue and was only permitted under a restaurant license. Amidst financial difficulties and the high cost of maintaining the shrine building, the Club find itself at the brink of bankruptcy.

== Possible demolition ==
On 28 October 2021, the former shrine was officially designated as a cultural heritage site by the Medan City Government. This recognition was based on Medan City Government Decree (SK) number 433 of 2021, issued by Mayor Bobby Nasution. Unexpectedly on 9 July, the provincial government bars the selling of the land to any third party other than the provincial government themselves. Then governor of North Sumatra, Edy Rahmayadi, revealed the plan of the North Sumatra Provincial Government to buy Medan Club. Deeming it necessary to develop the land and expand office facilities for the benefit of local government and the community. Though a spokesperson vaguely stated that the purchase of the Medan Club won't necessarily result in "its disappearance," intending to buy other plots near the building to replace it. The land was agreed to be bought for over Rp.457 billion (or $28,567,070.00 in USD) and has been estimated in the 2022 North Sumatran Regional Revenue and Expenditure Budget (APBD) amounting to Rp.300 billion and the rest Rp.157 billion more, estimated in the 2023 North Sumatran APBD. The purchase brought in criticism, starting from the urgency for the benefit of the people of North Sumatra, to the price. Edy spoke up to this criticism by saying that had the land was not purchased, the Medan Club's land could have been rebuilt as a hotel, apartment or plaza. He further argued, "Imagine a building that could be 50 floors high while the government building is only 10 floors; imagine that." He also planned to purchase an old house beside the former shrine.

The purchasing mechanism was also said to be violating the rules as the Shrine was built on the lands owned by the Sultanate of Deli, who was thought to have never been compensated. The Suka Piring Administration and those representing the heirs of the Sultan of Deli sued the Medan Club Association Management for more than IDR 442.9 billion at the Medan District Court (PN). Akhmad Syamrah, a spokes person for the Suka Piring, claimed that the land that would be used for the expansion of the North Sumatra Governor's Office still belongs to the Deli indigenous community, as it was formerly given to the Medan Deli Maatschappij as a Concession by the sultanate. Based on Law No. 86 of 1958, all land and buildings that were once controlled and operated by the Dutch were then nationalized by the Indonesian Government and declared to be state property. However it is uncertain whether the Medan Club takeover from the De Witte Sociëteit was the result of nationalization or a takeover. After time, the issue was deemed to be legal after a ruling by the North Sumatra High Prosecutor's Office.

On 16 January 2023, the barrier between the former shrine and the provincial office has been destroyed, intending to use the land for parking space and local social activities for the time being. In the aftermath of the destroyed barrier, the legality of the demolition is in question, whether the provincial government could destroy a cultural heritage site given its heritage status. Isnen Fitri, a professor to the University of North Sumatra, gives a neutral perspective on the purchase. She believes that it is the government's job to develop the land of the Medan Club as a heritage site, stipulated in Government Regulation Number 1 of 2022 and Ministerial Regulation Number 19 of 2021. Though also noting that the demolition of the site would violate the law. She added that buildings such as the shamusho and cities are dynamic and not static and thus, methods like allowing changes in ownership and function are vital to accommodating and ensuring that historic buildings remain visible today. Though nether at a point of total conservation or destruction. Ichwan Azhari believes that the Cultural Heritage Law could be violated but the law states that one is not allowed to damage or replace anything in the building, including the building itself and its surrounding environment.

On 30 October 2024, the cost overrun over Rp.457 billion was later criticised by then Mayor Bobby Nasution Bobby during the 2024 North Sumatra gubernatorial election debate. He questioned the priority of the budget, considering that such large funds could be allocated for free health programmes for the community through Universal Health Coverage (UHC). The building lay unused as the government uses its land for government activities and local market festivals. Deputy Chair of Commission A of the North Sumatra DPRD, Zeira Salim Ritonga, also urged the government to use the building to its maximum potential, given its price tag, sudgesting it should be used as a government service office, such as for regional tax and levies. On 5 March 2025, Isnen Fitri stated that the Shamusho building is currently run by a foundation but under-optimized, and argued it should be revitalized through adaptive reuse so its historical value is preserved while generating income, for example via café or boutique-hotel style programming.

On 8 May 2025, amidst heavy rain, a large old tree fell on the former Medan Cub land, damaging the nearby iron wire fence of the tennis court. Due to the tree's size, the shrine area was evacuated, and a crane was required to remove it. Due to the falling, parts of the North-West roofing were damaged, leaving a hole in its wooden roofing.

On 16 November 2025, the North Sumatra Provincial Government plans to hand over the land (and two others) to Bank Sumut as part of a capital-injection strategy to strengthen the bank's capital base and maintain a >51% provincial ownership stake. Payment for the land was split into two installments: Rp 300 billion in 2022 and Rp 157 billion in 2023. Though, on 26 November 2025, the North Sumatra Prosperous Justice Party (PKS) faction urged the provincial government to remove the former shrine from its proposal to inject regional assets as non-cash capital into Bank Sumut because the property is seen as risky and potentially burdensome. PKS says the former Medan Club site has very high rehabilitation costs (approximately Rp 100 billion), is limited in use, and could trigger losses for the bank instead of strengthening its finances. The party also rejects its use of any retooling of functions due to its historical and heritage status. The party argues that including such an asset could weaken Bank Sumut's financial ratios and recommends selling problematic assets first and contributing cash instead. Even so, at the Rapat Umum Pemegang Saham Luar Biasa (RUPS-LB) for Bank Sumut on 30 December 2025, shareholders approved including provincial assets as inbreng (non-cash capital) into the bank, and among the assets listed for that purpose were Medan Club, Pеkan Raуa Sumatеra Utara, and the office building of the provincial Industry, Trade and ESDM Office. On 7 March 2026, another tree at the site was cut down, drawing criticism over whether the felling had been supported by technical and academic assessments establishing that the tree was dead, dangerous, or interfering with the structure of the heritage site.

The future of the former shrine is uncertain, with its complete demolition being a possibility. Plans are underway to construct a multi-purpose building on this site, serving as a hub for public services, permits, and other administrative functions. The Detailed Engineering Design (DED) for the building is currently being prepared, with an estimated budget of around Rp500 million. The North Sumatra Provincial Government is currently lobbying for the Perindo Party's building, located right next to the Medan Club, to sell its land. As the area including the shrine itself was designated as an office zone and the maximum building height for the area being 13 floors according to the City Regional Regulation No. 2/2015 on the Detailed Spatial Plan (RDTR) and Zoning Regulations of Medan City 2015–2035.

== Structure ==
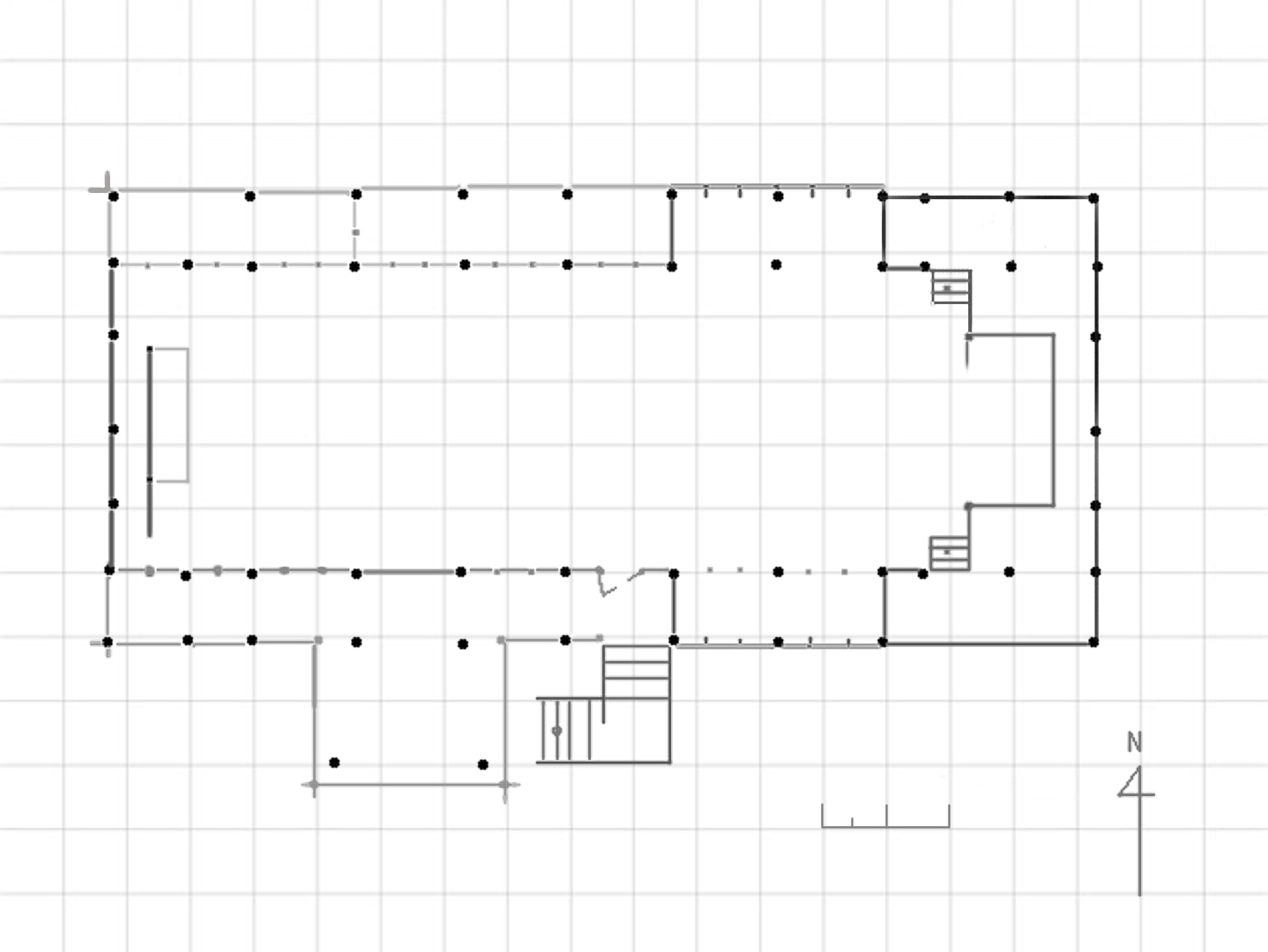

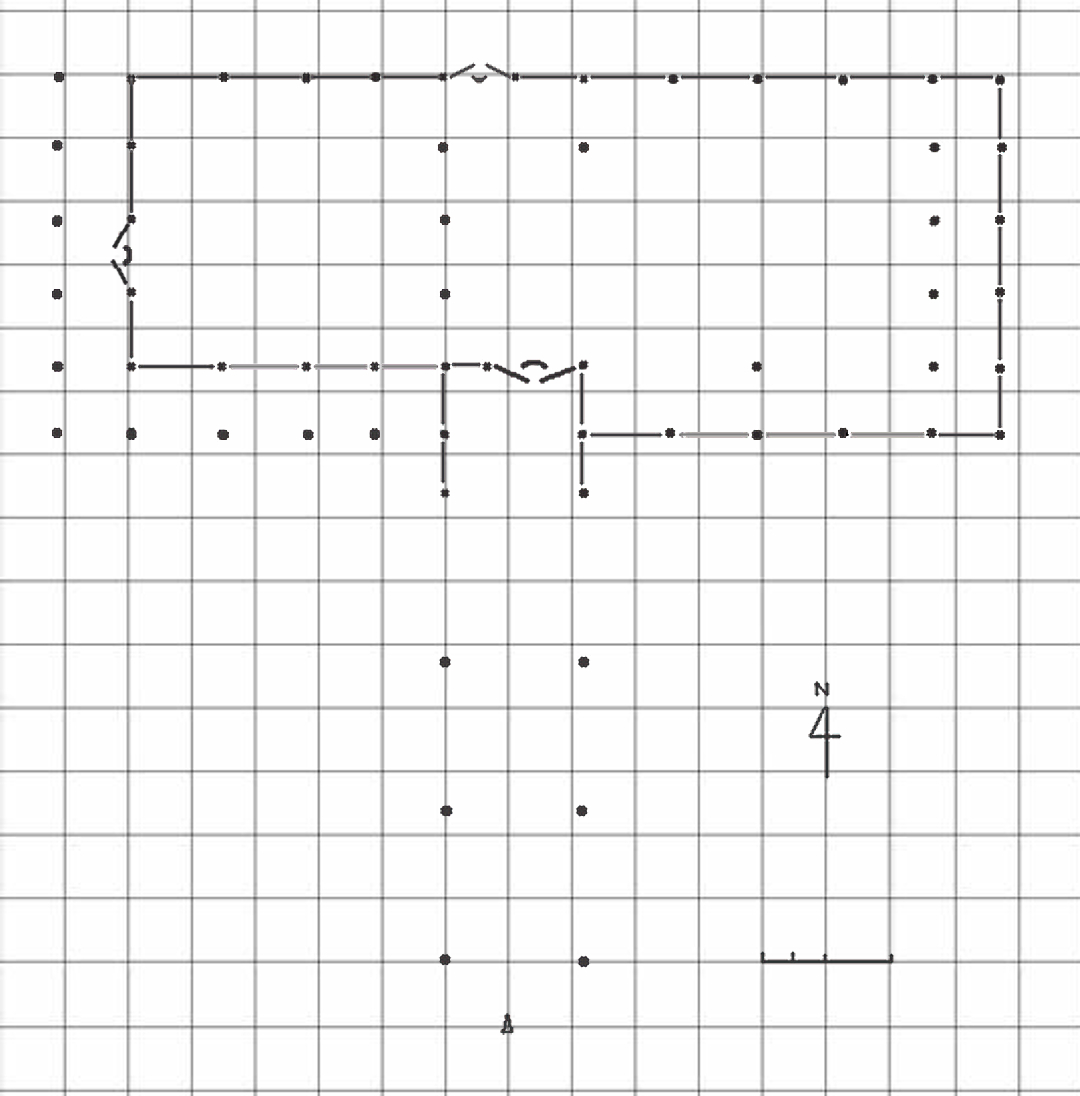
The shamusho's floor plan

The club's premises, which likely encompass the site of the old main shrine, feature Western-style partitioned rooms where members can eat local and western foods. Although the torii gate has been removed, careful observation reveals remnants of its past shrine aesthetics. Several ancient trees, believed to have been part of the original temple grounds, still stand on the property. According to Eswin Soekardja, the land encompassing the building used to be as large as 148,500 square metres or 1.5 hectares (now 1.4 hectares), including a golf course that may have previously been the shrine's garden, extending to the Deli River. The modern-day buildings encompassing the former shrine area are now the Medan State High School 1 (SMA Negeri 1 Medan), the former Balai Kartini building, and the Istana Koki restaurant.

The shamusho (社務所, shrine office), still remains the same, albeit partially altered. Noticeably the flooring of the shrine; now ceramic tiling rather than wood paneling for the earthen floor. It is thought that the shrine does not have a Honden (本殿, main hall) Though this might be the fact that it was destroyed by later redevelopments in the area. The shrine used to formerly have a pond across the street to what is now an intersection, estimated to be around 8 metres diameter. According to the Medan Heritage Organization, the building exhibits a hybrid architectural style, combining elements from both Japanese and Malay traditions. The roof, portico, and veranda handrail details reflect influences from traditional Japanese architecture, while the columns supporting the elevated floor are characteristic of Malay construction techniques. The only change the Dutch made during their takeover was adding windows, rather than leaving the shrine space as an open-air building. The remaining shamusho building housed administrative work areas, guest rooms, meeting rooms, an auditorium, a warehouse, accommodation for priests, employee housing, a kitchen, and other support spaces.

The exact main purpose of the shrine remains unclear, as the honden (and possibly the haiden) were destroyed and very little information exists. Researchers from the University of Kanagawa who visited the site initially hypothesized that the shrine was used to honor the war dead, known as a Gokoku shrine (formerly Shokonsha). Though it might as well suggest that the honden enshrines Amaterasu Ōmikami, the Sun Goddess and highest deity in Shinto, making it a shinmei shrine. And that the Haiden (拝殿, worship hall) was used to pray for the welfare of the Japanese and Indonesian people. Though to Ito Masatoshi of Nihon University, such shrines would not be created for the benefit and welfare of the locals but rather for political reasons as praying towards Amaterasu held the same footing as praying to the Emperor at that time.

Once infamous Dutch poet and writer, Rudy Kousbroek, visited the former shrine during his work for NRC Handelsblad in the 1980s. He described the former shrine as "possessing the sophistication of simplicity, modesty, and silence. Its unadorned surfaces, natural proportions, and raw wood evoked an aesthetic that had been cultivated over a thousand years, devoid of any display of power, ostentation, or vulgarity." Later stating on his first visit:

"Here in Sumatra, I stared at it in amazement: it was the first time I saw two worlds coincide, worlds that are better kept separate for one's peace of mind. It reminded me of the Japanese I encountered during the war. They must have looked at this, at that wooden veranda, those red lacquered stairs. They must have celebrated their victories here, sat on this plank floor, and perhaps even enjoyed it. This time, it's not different people, but the same ones. The same individuals who built the Pakanbaroe railway also built this hall. By the same prisoners of war."

== Gallery ==
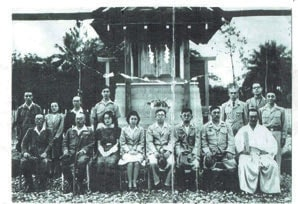
Wedding ceremony group photo. Front row, second from left, the mediator, Lieutenant General Tetsuzo Nakajima and to his right, Itoko Koyama, who was in Medan as a military writer (April 7, 1944.)

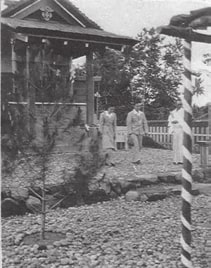
Hirohara Jinja's haiden (拝殿) with visible tamagaki (玉垣) (c. 1944)

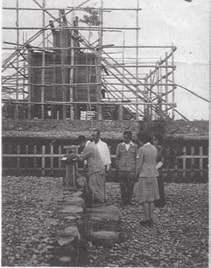
A Kannushi performs a shrine Tamagushi ceremony during the construction of the shamusho (社務所) of the Hirohara shrine (c. 1944)

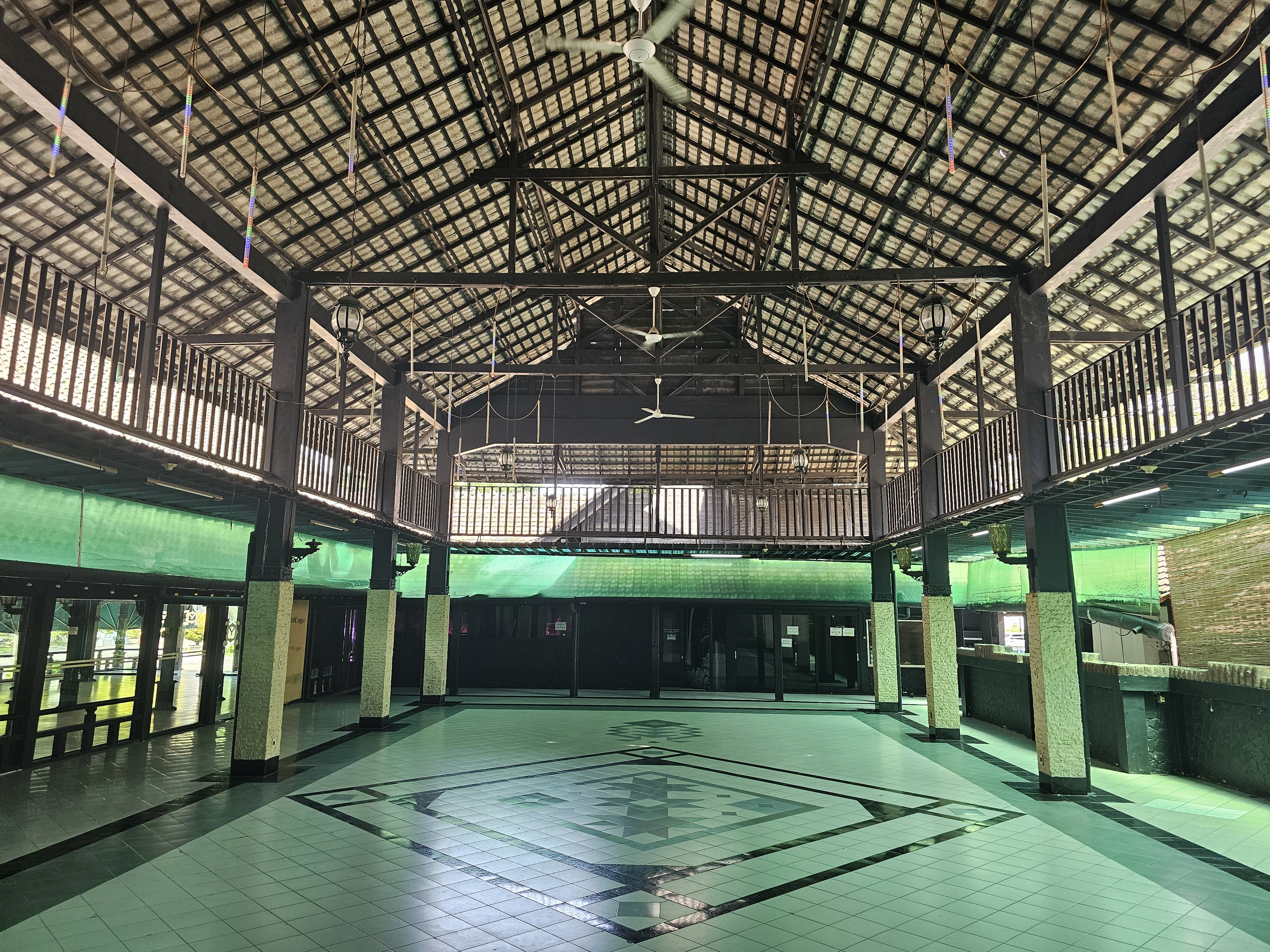
Same side view of the shamusho today, now an indoor area. Identified by the shamusho's low sideroof overhang and the wood structuring of the gable wall. The visible elevation step remains present, now as a wall (bottom right)

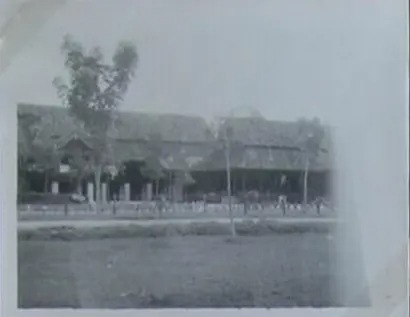
Hirohara Shrine complex from afar.

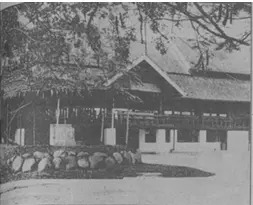
Old front view of the shamusho.

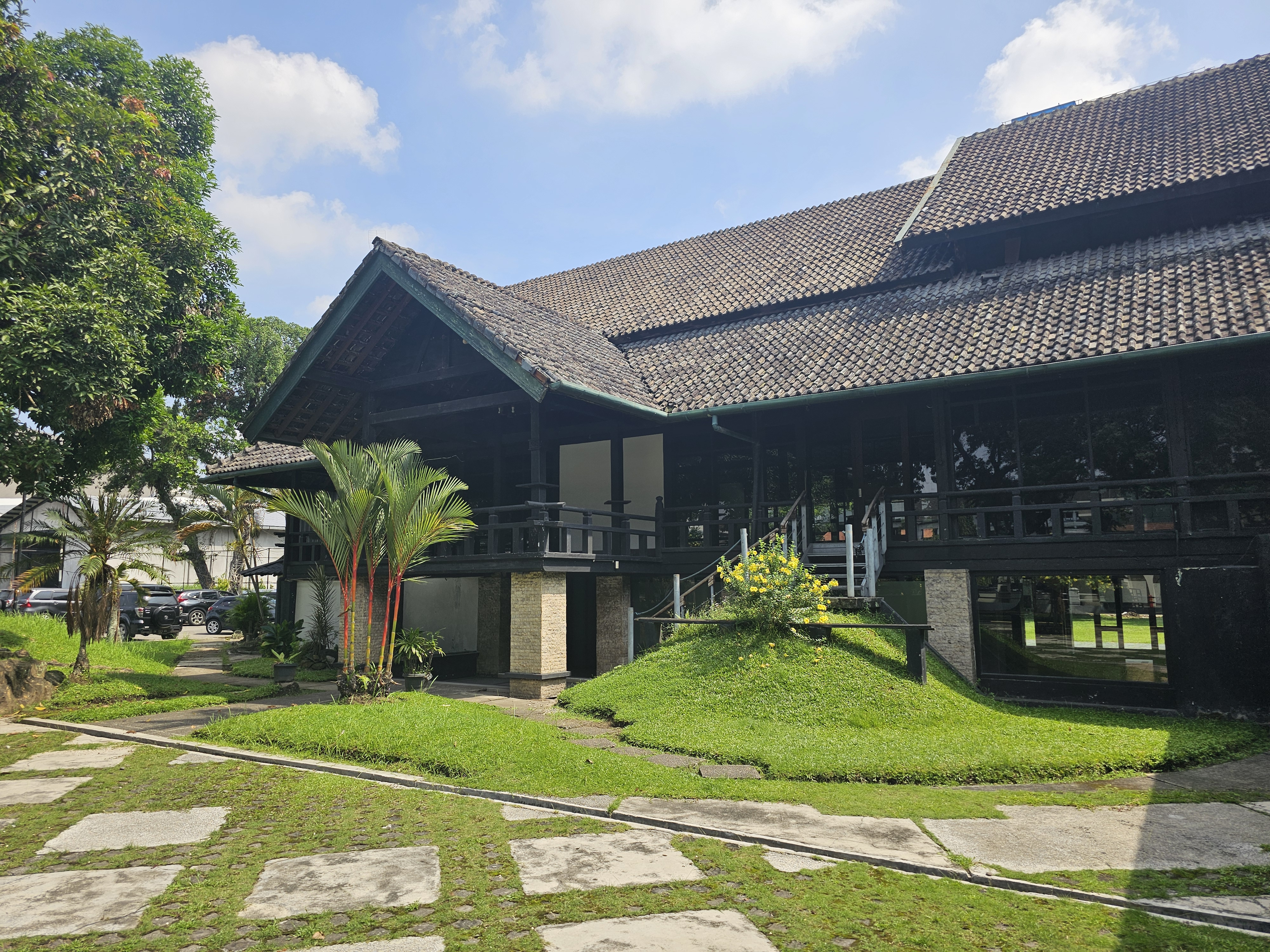
Hirohara Jinja, second building

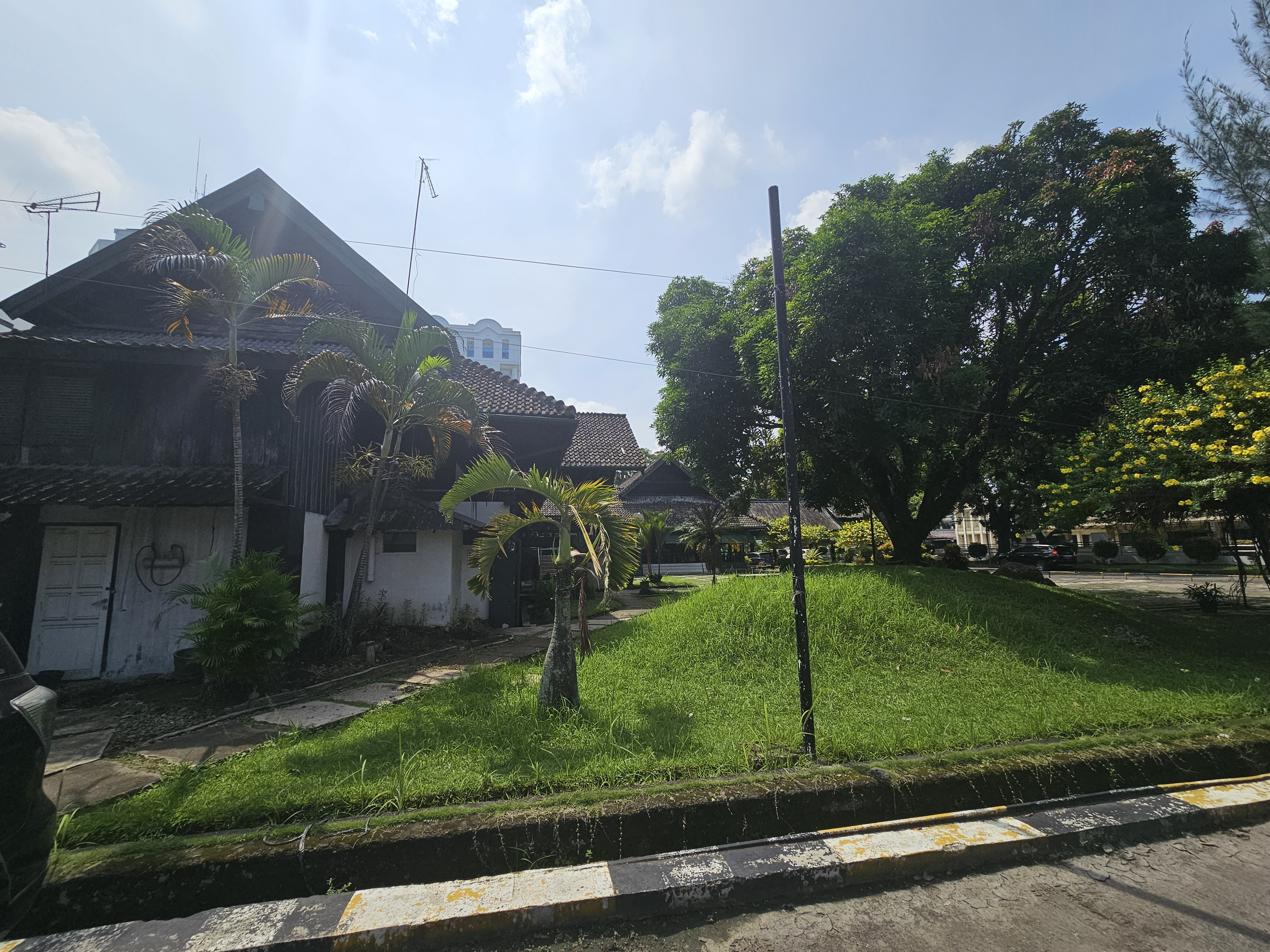
Sideview of the Shamusho. Terrace mounds still visible

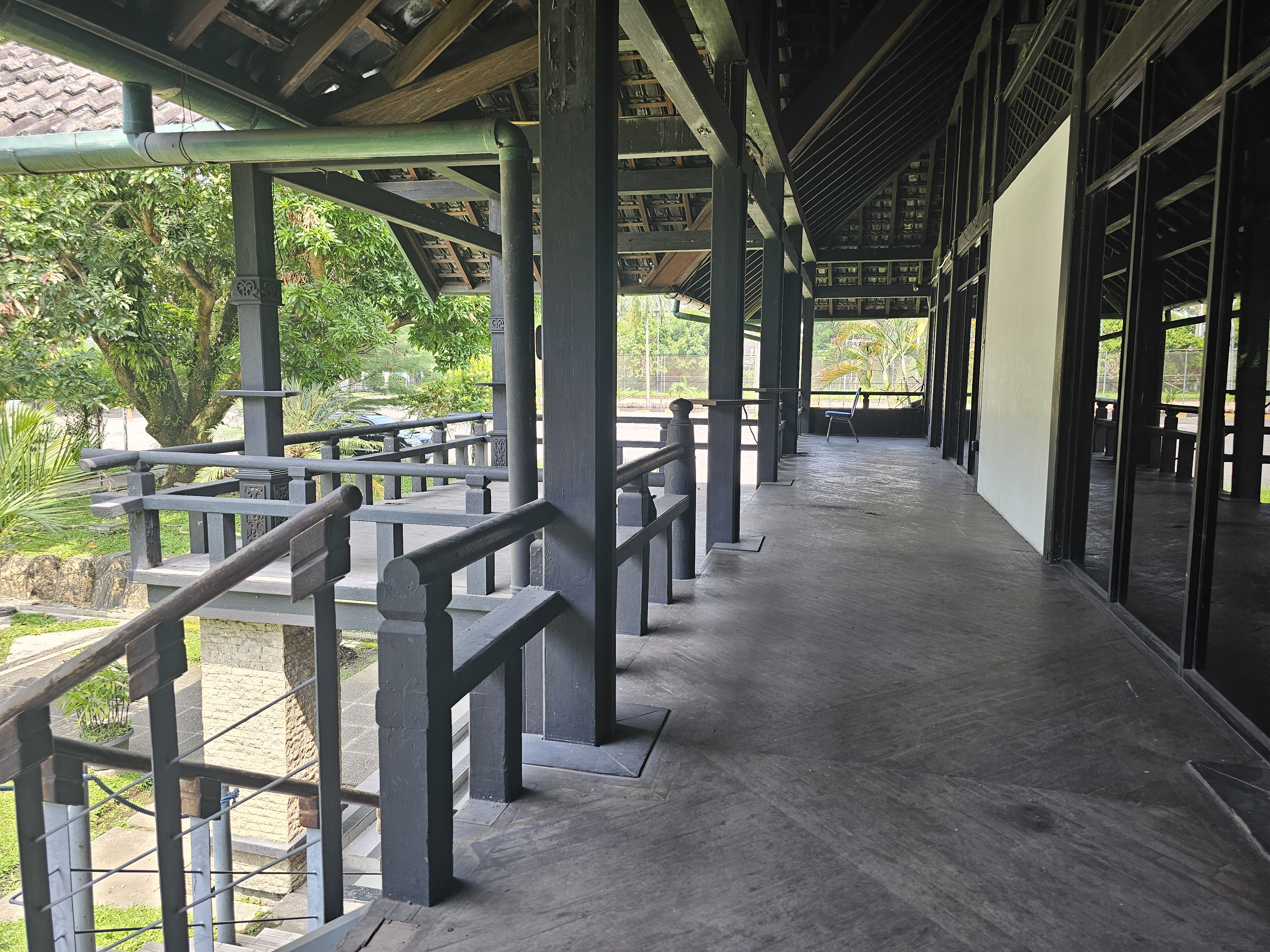
Shamusho front balcony. Stairs likely made at a later date

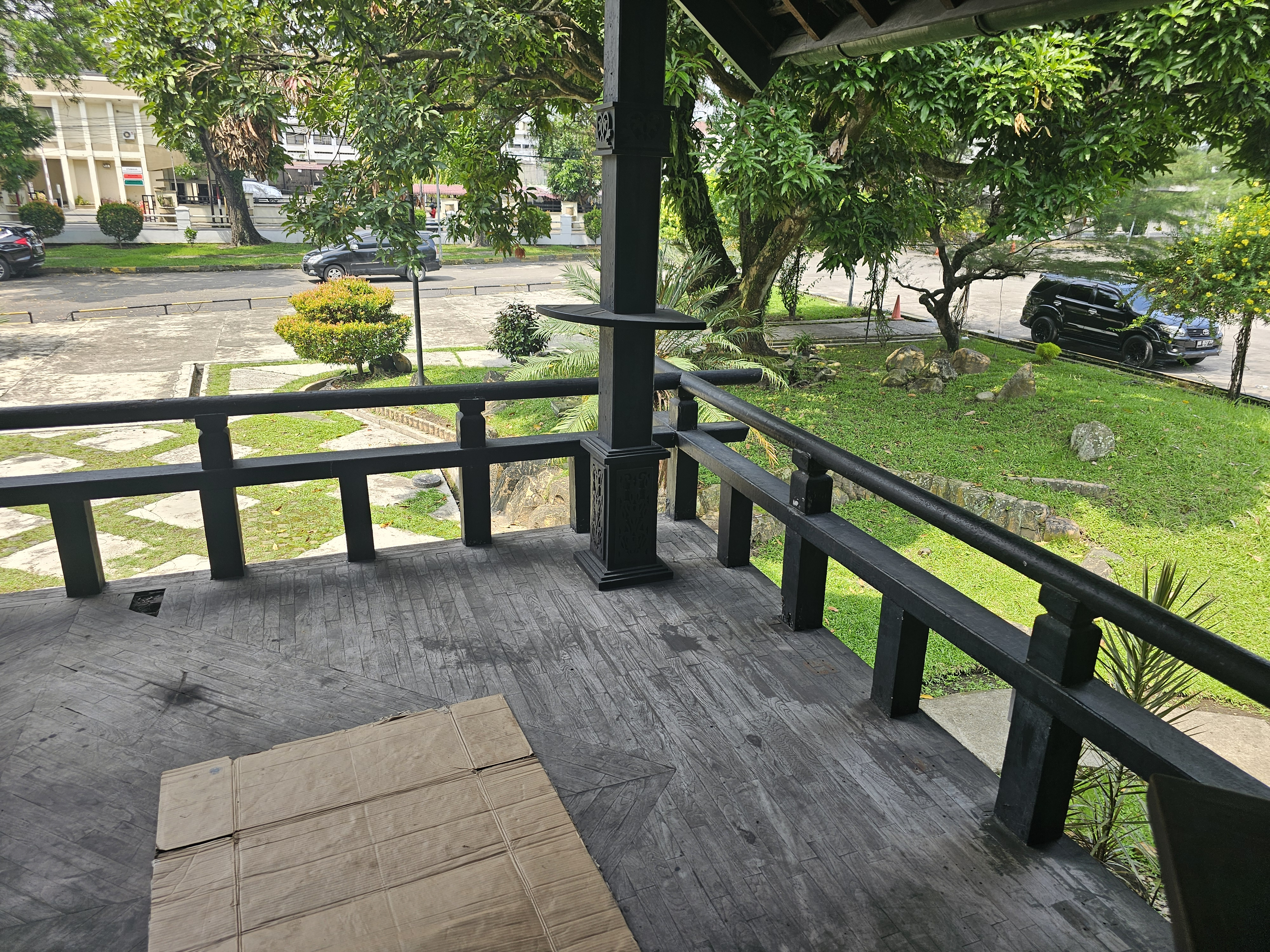
Shamusho front balcony garden view

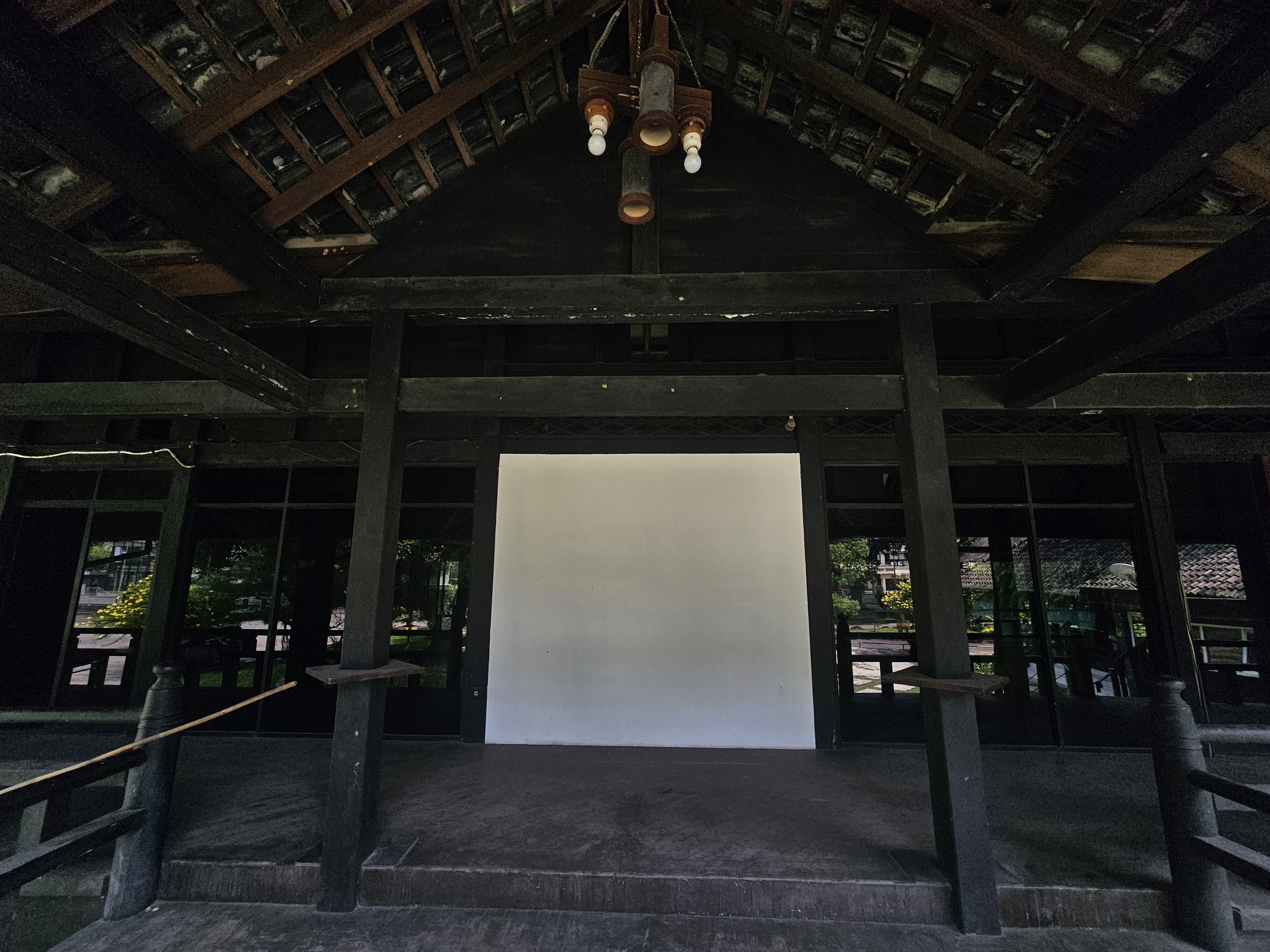
Shamusho front balcony wood works

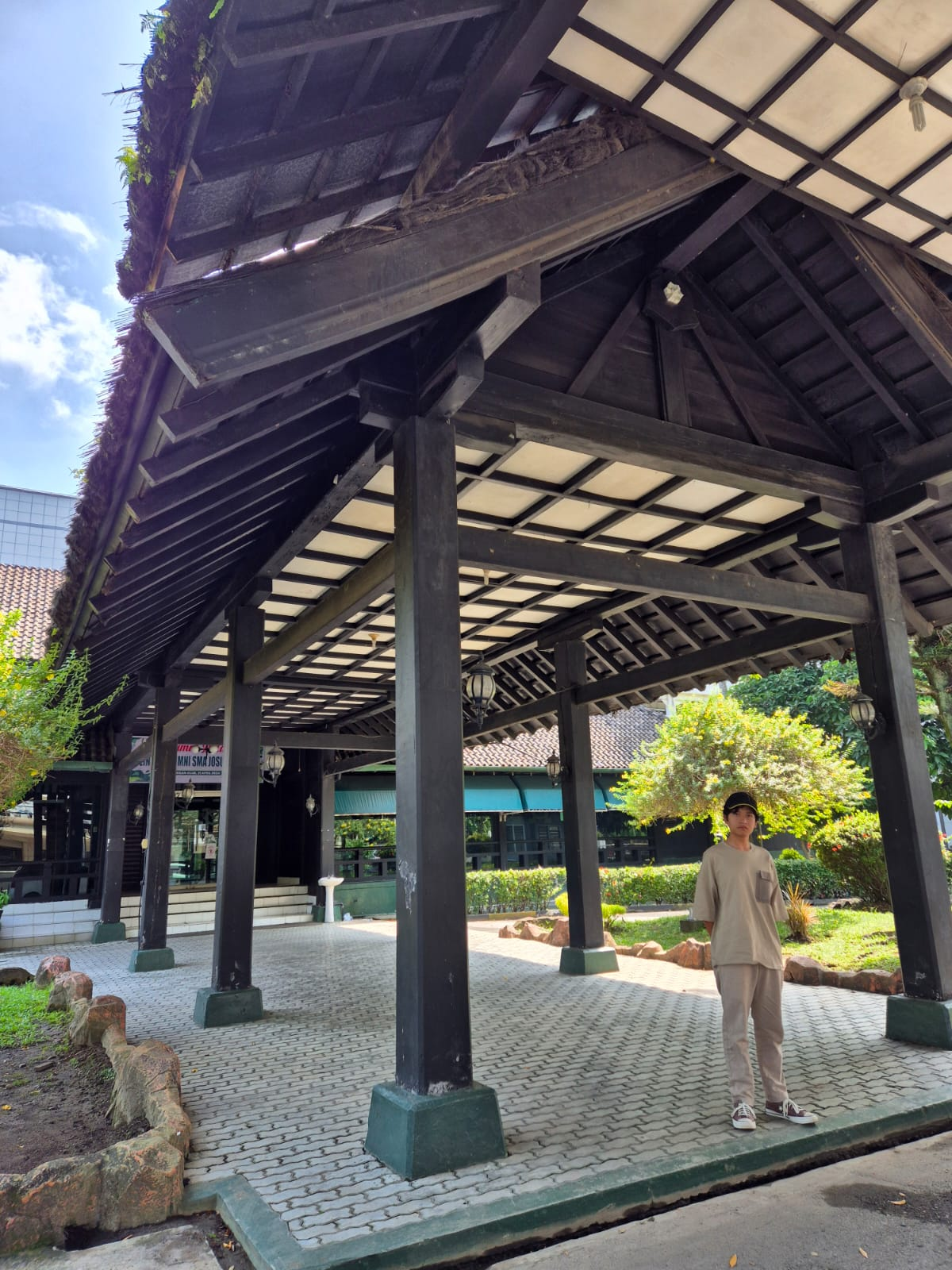
Entrance roofing. Notice the usage of straw roofing (Kayabuki)

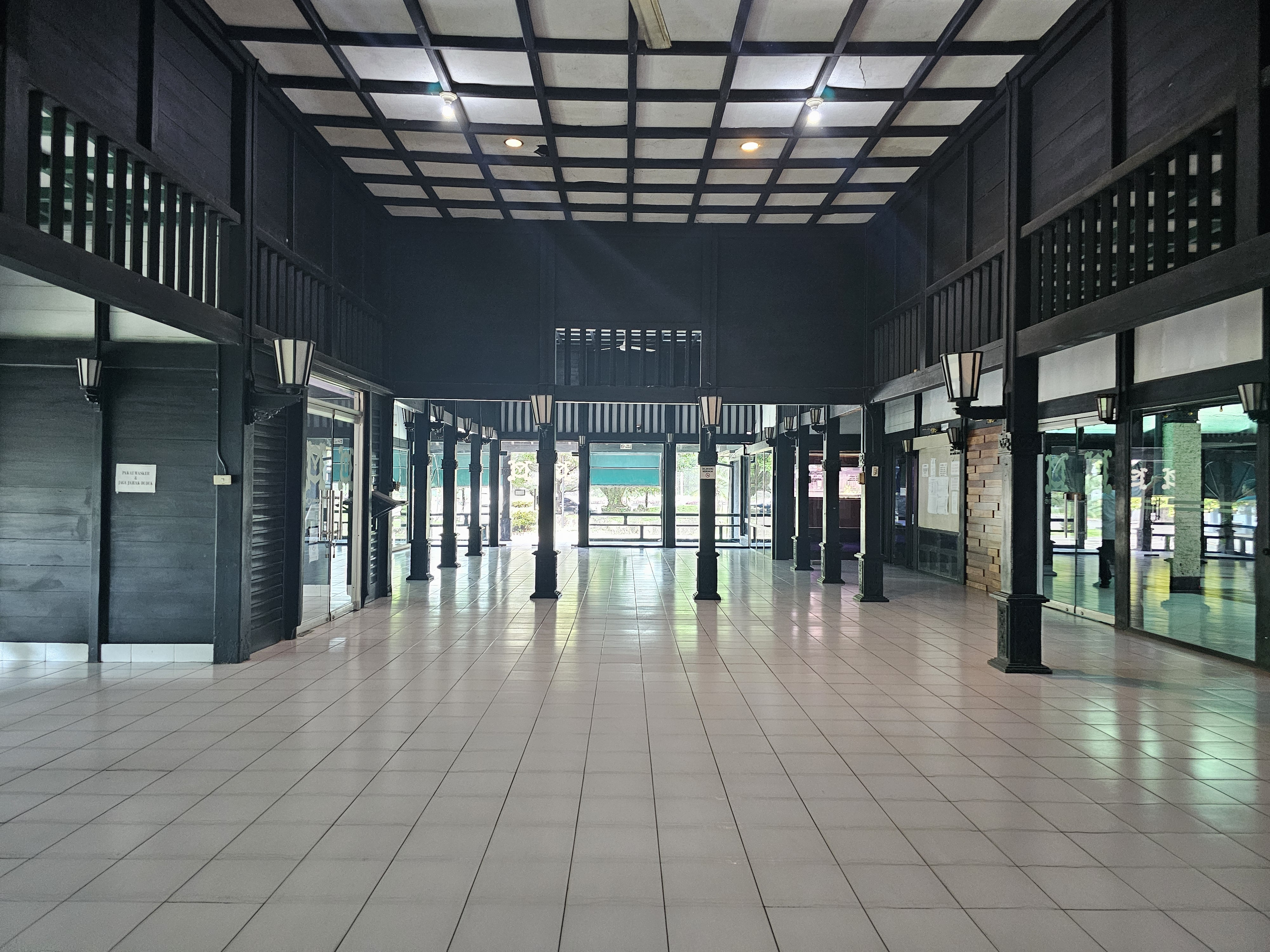
Interior of the shamusho

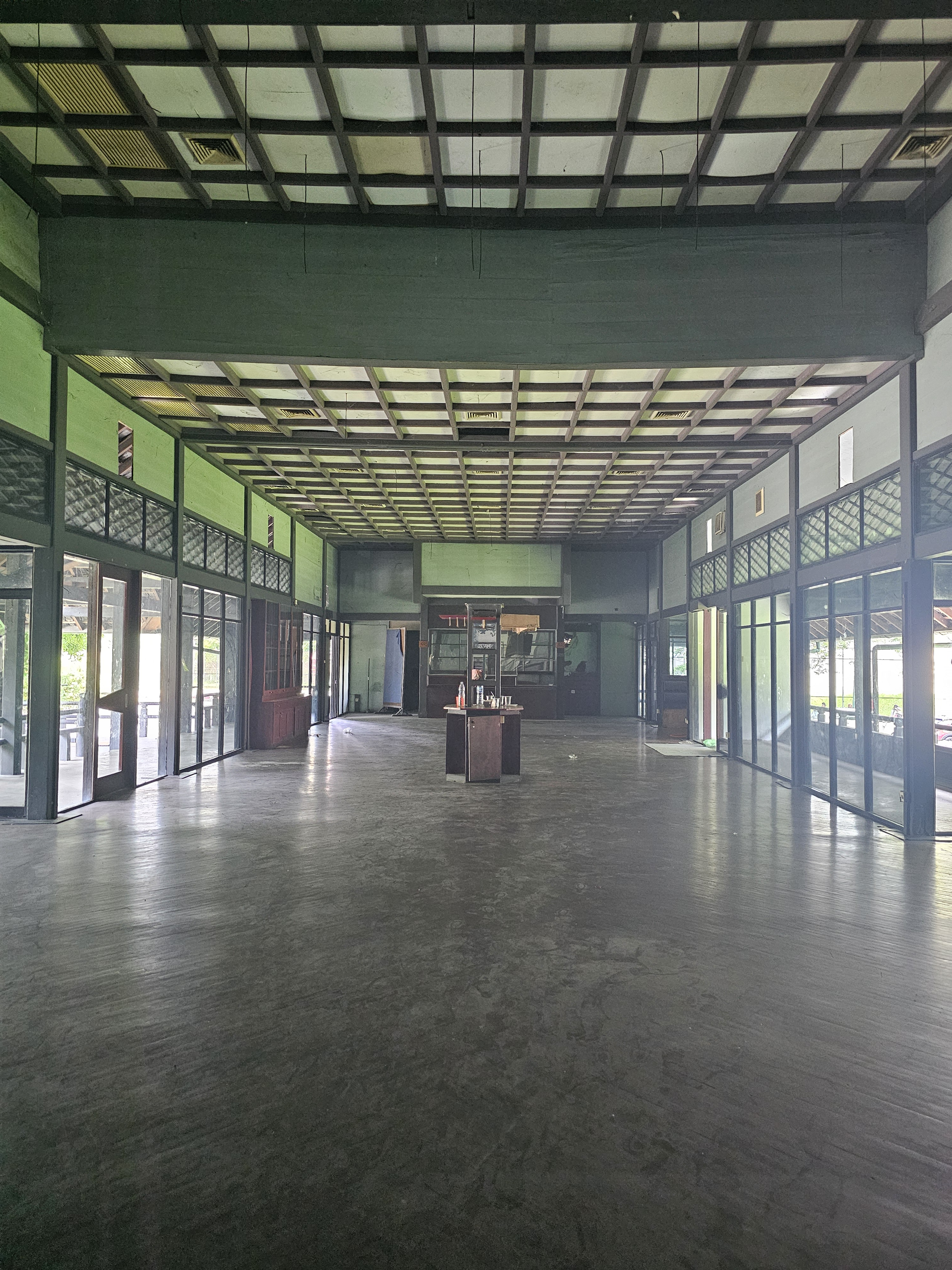
Interior of the hall (back)

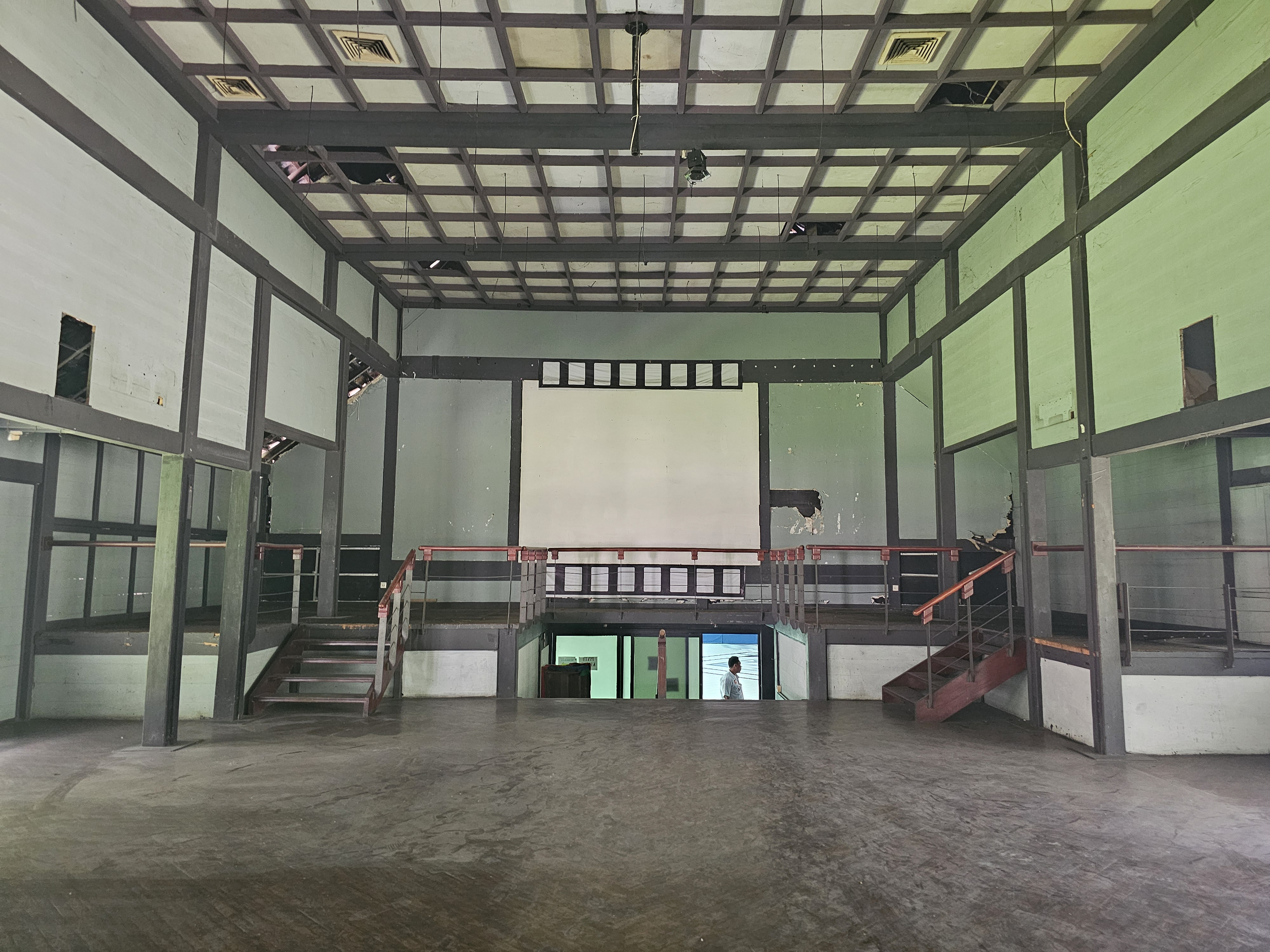
Interior of the hall (front)

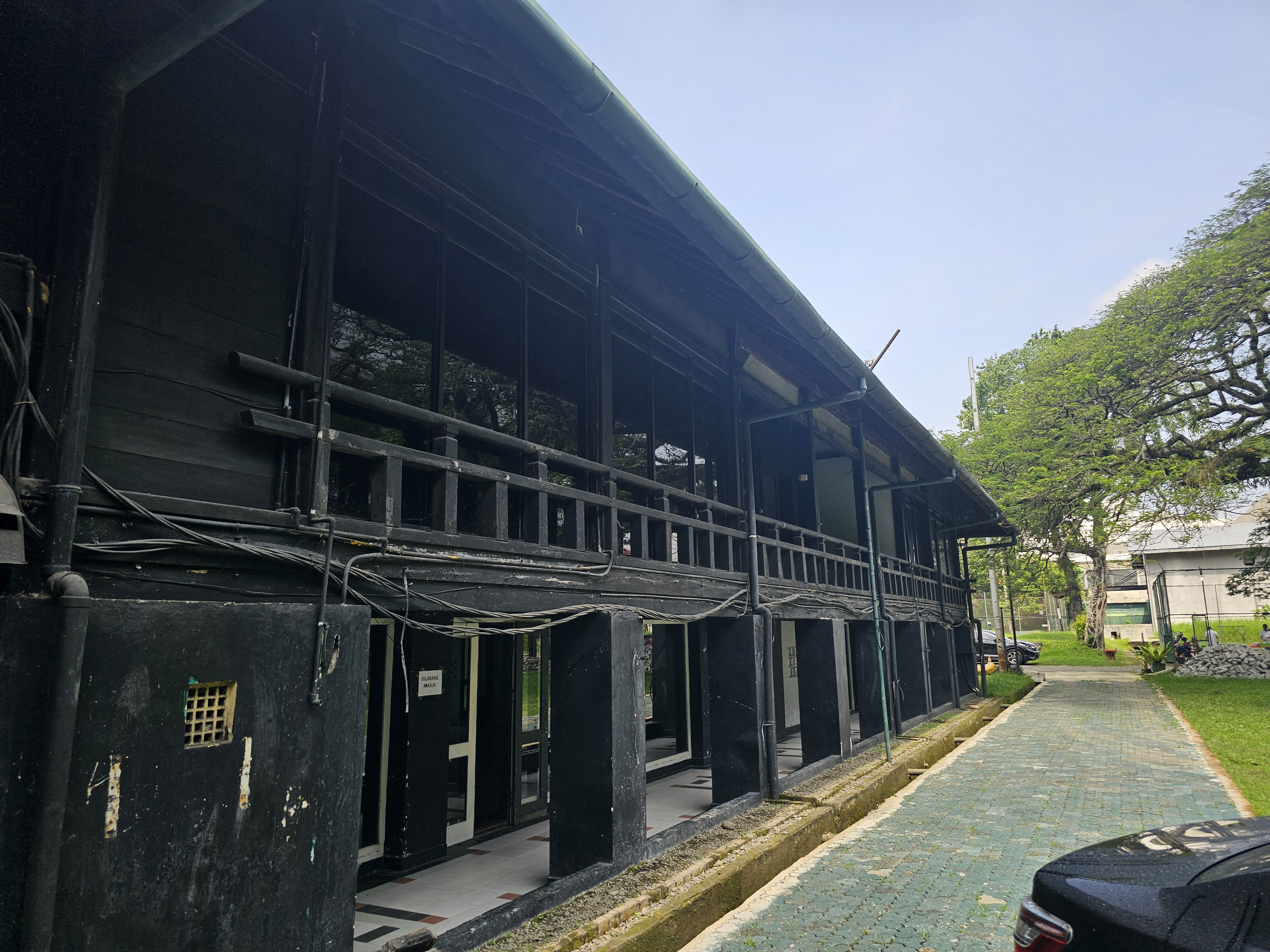
Shamusho backside. Wooden railings on what was formerly a balcony still visible

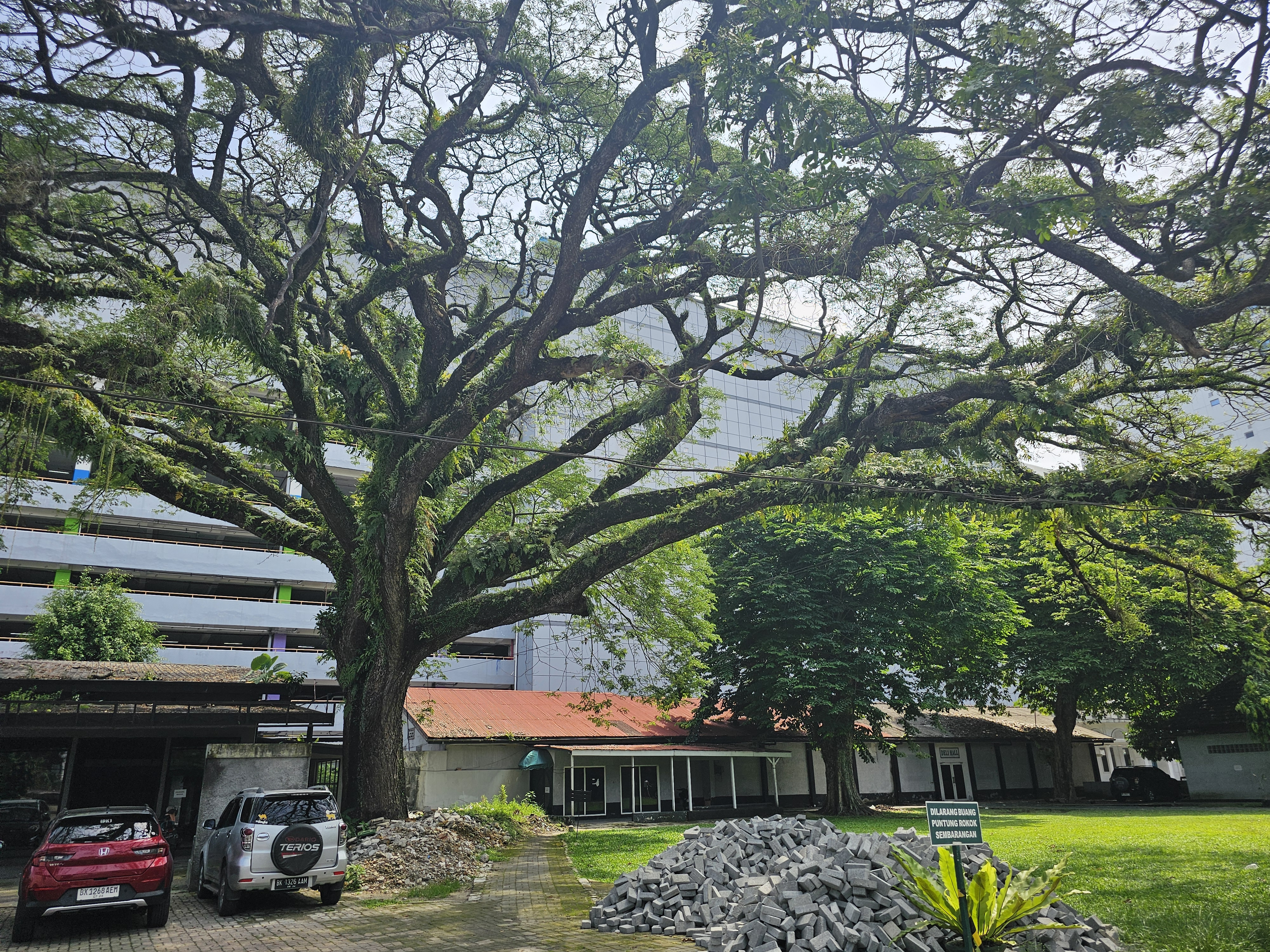
Old trees line the back of the shamusho. The large tree that once towered over the shrine area fell on 8 May 2025.

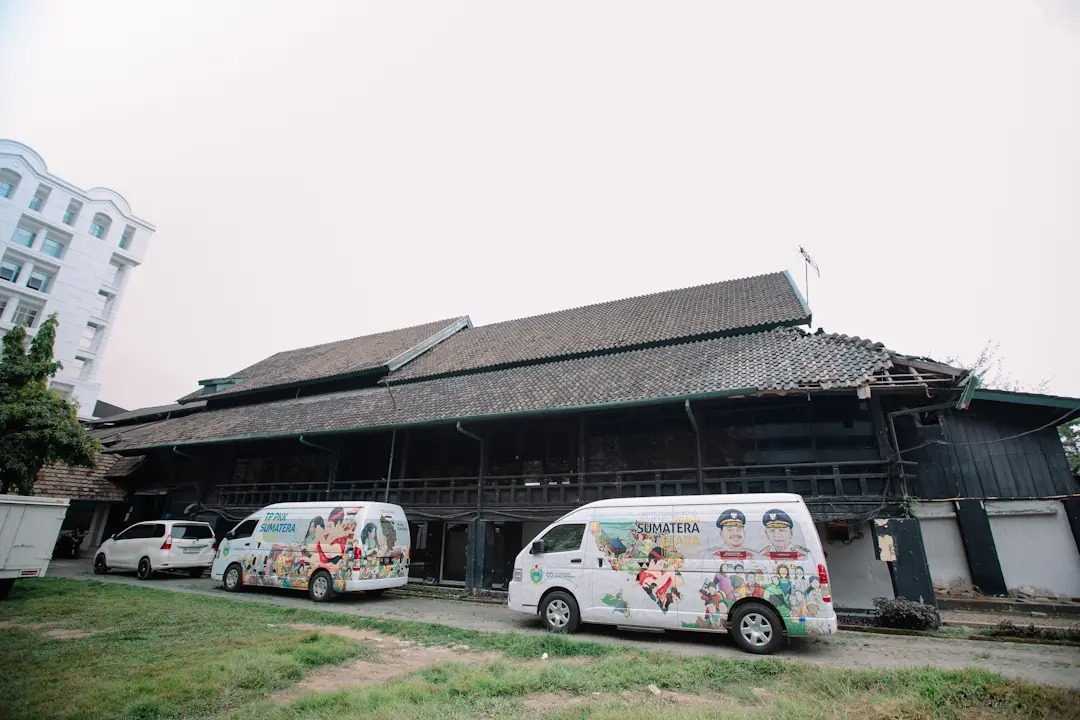
Roof damage incurred by the tree falling (c. 2026)

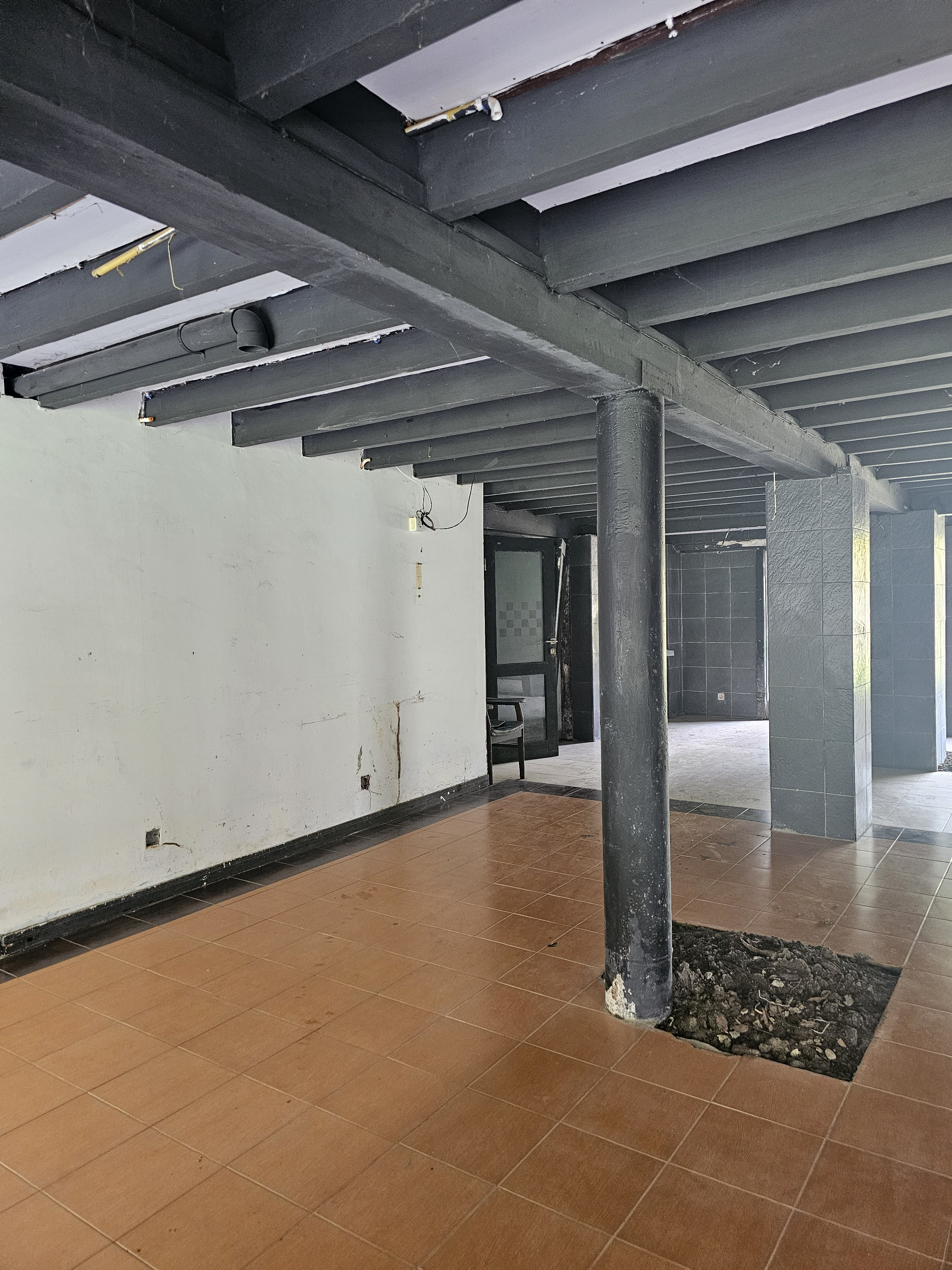
Lower section of the second building, showing the original support structure alongside modern concrete additions.
