= 2024 North Sumatra gubernatorial election =

- 27 November 2024
- Turnout: 55.27% (▼6.51pp)
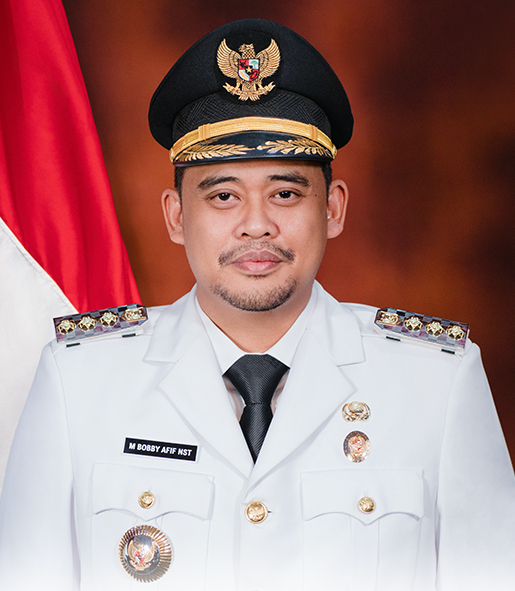

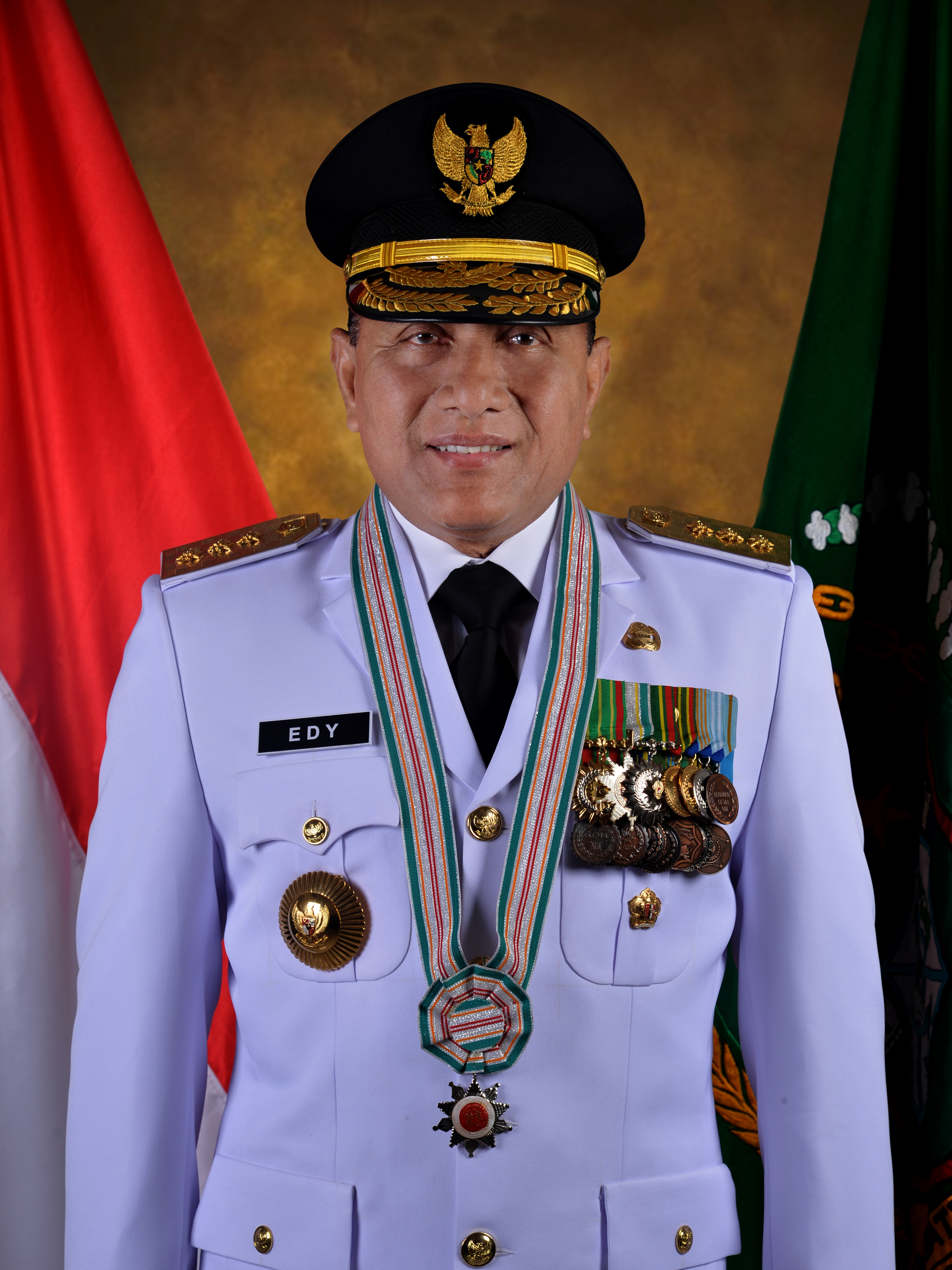
Nominee	Bobby Nasution	Edy Rahmayadi
Party	Gerindra	PDI-P
Alliance	KIM Plus	–
Running mate	Surya	Hasan Basri Sagala
Popular vote	3,645,611	2,009,311
Percentage	64.47%	35.53%
- Results map by district
Governor before election
Agus Fatoni (acting)
Independent
Elected Governor
Bobby Nasution
Gerindra

A gubernatorial election was held in North Sumatra on 27 November 2024 alongside other local elections nationwide to elect the governor and vice governor for a five-year term. Medan Mayor Bobby Nasution of the Gerindra Party won the election in a landslide with 64% of the vote. He defeated former Governor Edy Rahmayadi of the Indonesian Democratic Party of Struggle (PDI-P), who received 35%.

== Electoral system ==
The election, like other local elections in 2024, follow the first-past-the-post system where the candidate with the most votes wins the election, even if they do not win a majority. It is possible for a candidate to run uncontested, in which case the candidate is still required to win a majority of votes "against" an "empty box" option. Should the candidate fail to do so, the election will be repeated on a later date.

A political party or coalition of parties must held at least 20 seats in the North Sumatra Regional House of Representatives to be able to field a pair of candidates for Governor and Vice Governor. With 22 and 21 seats each, both Golkar and PDI-P are able to field their own pair of candidates for Governor and Vice Governor without the need to form a coalition of parties. Candidates may alternatively demonstrate support in form of photocopies of identity cards, which in North Sumatra's case corresponds to 814,046 copies. No such candidates registered with the General Elections Commission by the provided deadline.

Former Governor Edy Rahmayadi was eligible for a second term.

== Candidates ==
=== Declared ===
The following are individuals who have declared his/her candidacy for Governor/Vice Governor:

1
Candidate from Gerindra and Golkar
Bobby Nasution	Surya
for Governor	for Vice Governor
Mayor of Medan (2021–2025)	Regent of Asahan (2021–current)
Parties
73 / 100 (73%) Golkar (22 seats); Gerindra (13 seats); NasDem (12 seats); PKS (10 seats); PAN (6 seats); Demokrat (5 seats); PKB (4 seats); PPP (1 seat)
Slogan
Kolaborasi Sumut Berkah

After deciding between Bobby Nasution and Musa Rajekshah, Golkar Chairman Airlangga Hartanto decided to back Bobby Nasution as his party's choice for Governor of North Sumatra as Musa Rajekshah was then tasked to serve in the People's Representative Council. Hartanto later recommended HIPMI chairman Akbar Buchari and chairwoman of Golkar's Surakarta branch Sekar Tanjung as Nasution's running mate.

On 4 July 2024, the National Awakening Party (PKB) declared their support for Bobby Nasution for the and recommended actress and social media influencer Nagita Slavina as his running mate, citing the need of a female candidate.

2
Candidate from PDIP
Edy Rahmayadi	Hasan Basri Sagala
for Governor	for Vice Governor
Governor of North Sumatra (2018–2023)	Expert Staff in Ministry of Religious Affairs
Parties
26 / 100 (26%) PDIP (21 seats)Hanura (5 seats)
Slogan
Sumut Menang Bermartabat

=== Potential ===
The following are individuals who have either been publicly mentioned as a potential candidate, or considered as such by press:

- Basuki Tjahaja Purnama (PDI-P), President Commissioner of Pertamina (2019–2024), Governor of Jakarta (2014–2017), Vice Governor of Jakarta (2012–2014), Regent of East Belitung (2005–2006), member of House of Representatives for Bangka Belitung (2009–2012).
- Hassanuddin, Acting Governor of North Sumatra (2023–2024).
- Nikson Nababan (PDI-P), Regent of North Tapanuli (2014–current).
- Rahmansyah Sibarani (NasDem), Deputy Speaker of the North Sumatra Regional House of Representatives (2019–2024).
- Rapidin Simbolon (PDI-P), Vice Regent of Samosir (2014–2019).
- Sekar Tanjung (Golkar), Chief of Golkar Surakarta branch and daughter of former Speaker of the House of Representatives Akbar Tanjung.

=== Declined ===
The following are individuals who have either been publicly mentioned as a potential candidate, but chose not to run:

- Musa Rajekshah (Golkar), entrepreneur, Vice Governor of North Sumatra (2018–2023).

=== Endorsements ===
Bobby Nasution

Executive Branch

- Airlangga Hartarto, Coordinating Minister for Economic Affairs and Chairman of Golkar
- Sandiaga Uno, Minister of Tourism & Creative Economy
- Zulkifli Hasan, Minister of Trade and Chairman of the National Mandate Party

Municipal officials

- H. Amiruddin, former Speaker of the Medan City Regional House of Representatives
- Renville Pandapotan Napitupulu, member of the Medan City Regional House of Representatives

Organizations

- Projo

== Debate ==
The first North Sumatra gubernatorial debate for the 2024 election took place on Wednesday, 30 October 2024, at the Grand Mercure Hotel in Medan. Organised by the North Sumatra Provincial General Election Commission (KPU), the debate centred on the theme "Public Service and Community Welfare." The event featured five segments, during which candidates addressed questions posed by moderators based on input from a panel of experts. Each candidate pair was permitted to bring up to 75 supporters to the venue. To ensure security, over 300 personnel from the Regional Police, local police units, and the military were deployed, with the Mobile Brigade conducting a venue sweep six hours prior to the debate. The debate saw incumbent Governor Edy Rahmayadi and Medan Mayor Bobby Nasution engaging in a heated exchange over their respective policies. Nasution criticised Rahmayadi's previous administration for alleged inadequate healthcare access and unaffordable education, promising reforms if elected.

Notably, Bobby Nasution criticised Edy Rahmayadi's decision regarding the purchase of the former Medan Club land worth more than IDR 400 billion. Bobby questioned the priority of the budget, considering that such large funds could be allocated for free health programmes for the community through Universal Health Coverage (UHC). Responding to this criticism, Edy Rahmayadi explained that implementing UHC is not as easy as imagined and requires adequate health infrastructure. Edy also mentioned that the purchase of the Medan Club is a ‘bonus’ for North Sumatra, and asked the public not to be lied to with promises of free health services that may not necessarily be realised. Edy's statement triggered reactions from various parties, including the North Sumatra Al Washliyah Student Association (HIMMAH). Chairman of PW HIMMAH North Sumatra, Kamaluddin Nazuli Siregar, questioned the transparency and urgency of the asset purchase amidst economic conditions that are still recovering post-pandemic. He emphasised that such large funds could have been utilised for the benefit of the community, such as health, education, or infrastructure. Rahmayadi mean whille defended his record and questioned Nasution's experience.

The second debate took place on 6 November 2024, at the Santika Dyandra Hotel in Medan. The debate shifted to topics of regional competitiveness and sustainable development. In this round, Rahmayadi challenged Nasution to address allegations linking him to a graft case, intensifying the confrontational tone of the campaign.

== Political map ==
Following the 2024 Indonesian general election, eleven political parties are represented in the North Sumatra Regional House of Representatives:

Political Parties	Seat Count
Party of Functional Groups (Golkar)	22 / 100
Indonesian Democratic Party of Struggle (PDI-P)	21 / 100
Great Indonesia Movement Party (Gerindra)	13 / 100
NasDem Party	12 / 100
Prosperous Justice Party (PKS)	10 / 100
National Mandate Party (PAN)	6 / 100
People's Conscience Party (Hanura)	5 / 100
Democratic Party (Demokrat)	5 / 100
National Awakening Party (PKB)	4 / 100
Perindo Party	1 / 100
United Development Party (PPP)	1 / 100

== Incidents ==
=== Clashing supporters ===
After the second governor's debate held on Wednesday, 6 November 2024 in Santika Dyandra Hotel, Medan, an unknown group, allegedly Bobby Nasution's supporters, threw water bottles at Edy Rahmayadi while walking out to greet his supporters. Edy's supporters shielded him from harm, resulting in one of Edy's supporters being hit by a water bottle. Not long after the incident, Bobby Nasution's car was thrown rocks by Edy's supporters. The police were able to defuse the situation shortly after.

=== Flash floods ===
During dawn of the election day, Medan was hit by severe floods in some areas due to three rivers in Medan overflowing, causing some polling stations to be inaccessible. General Elections Commission announced that due to the flooding, a recount would be conducted in the affected areas. PDI-P Secretary General Hasto Kristiyanto claimed Bobby Nasution's urban planning policy was responsible for the flooding.

== Results ==
Candidate	Running mate	Party	Votes	%
Bobby Nasution	Surya	Gerindra Party	3,645,611	64.47
Edy Rahmayadi	Hasan Basri Sagala	Indonesian Democratic Party of Struggle	2,009,311	35.53
Total			5,654,922	100.00
Valid votes			5,654,922	94.98
Invalid votes			298,754	5.02
Total votes			5,953,676	100.00
Registered voters/turnout			10,771,496	55.27
Source: KPU Sumatera Utara
