= 2018 North Sumatra gubernatorial election =

← 2013	27 June 2018	2024 →
- Turnout: 61.8%
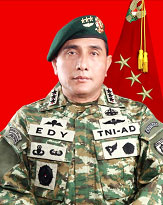

Nominee	Edy Rahmayadi	Djarot Saiful Hidayat
Party	PKS	PDI-P
Running mate	Musa Rajekshah	Sihar Sitorus
Popular vote	3,291,137	2,424,960
Percentage	57.58%	42.42%
- Results by city/regency
Governor before election
Tengku Erry Nuradi
Nasdem
Elected Governor
Edy Rahmayadi
Gerindra

The 2018 North Sumatra gubernatorial election took place on 27 June 2018 as part of the simultaneous local elections. It was held to elect the governor of North Sumatra along with their deputy, whilst members of the provincial council (Dewan Perwakilan Rakyat Daerah) will be re-elected in 2019.

Candidates were former Governor of Jakarta Djarot Saiful Hidayat and former commander of Kostrad Lt. Gen Edy Rahmayadi.

== Timeline ==
On 10 September 2017, the KPU declared that there will be 10,194,368 eligible voters in the province. The North Sumatran KPU set a budget of Rp 855 billion (US$59.9 million) for the election.

Registration for party-backed candidates were opened between 8 and 10 January 2018, while independent candidates were required to register between 22 and 26 November 2017. The candidates were assigned their ballot numbers on 13 February 2018. The campaigning period would commence between 15 February and 24 June, with a three-day election silence before voting on 27 June.

== Candidates ==
Under regulations, candidates are required to secure the support of a political party or a coalition thereof comprising at least 20 seats in the regional house. Alternatively, independent candidates may run provided they are capable of securing support from 6.5 percent of the total voter population (764,578) in form of photocopied ID cards subject to verification by the local committee although no candidates expressing interest managed to do this.

#	Candidate	Most recent position	Running mate	Parties
1	Edy Rahmayadi	Commander of Kostrad (2015-2018)	Musa Rajekshah	Golkar (17 seats); Gerindra (13 seats); Hanura (10 seats); PKS (9 seats); PAN (6 seats); Nasdem (5 seats) Total 50 seats
2	Djarot Saiful Hidayat	Mayor of Blitar (2000-2010); Vice Governor of Jakarta (2014-2017); Governor of Jakarta (2017)	Sihar Sitorus	PDI-P (16 seats); PPP (4 seats) Total 20 seats

While acting governor Tengku Erry Nuradi was eligible to run, he failed to secure sufficient support with his party Nasdem placing their support behind Edy-Musa instead.

Rahmayadi first registered at Hanura to run for the gubernatorial seat in August 2017, through his running mate and young entrepreneur Musa Rajeckshah. Gerindra, PKS and PAN declared their support for him in late December 2017. In order to participate in the election, Rahmayadi resigned from his position as Commander of the Kostrad in 2018. While initially expressing support for incumbent Tengku Erry Nuradi, Golkar and Nasdem diverted their support for Edy-Musa as well.

Djarot Saiful Hidayat, who lost as a running mate in the 2017 elections in Jakarta and briefly became its governor following the incarceration of Basuki Tjahaja Purnama, was declared by PDI-P as their candidate on 5 January 2018. Sihar Sitorus became his running mate, and the pair secured the support of PPP making them eligible to run.

Also registering as early as August, J.R. Saragih who was also the regional chair of Demokrat obtained official support on September. Closer to the registration limit, PKB declared their support once their cadre Ance Selian became running mate. PKPI, which held 3 seats in the regional parliament despite having none in the People's Representative Council, declared their support for the pair allowing them to run, but diverted their support to Djarot-Sihar after the registration process had been completed. However, the pair was disqualified due to failing verification in February 2018. After a failed lawsuit, the pair withdrew from the election and asked for their supporters to vote for Djarot instead.

== Polling ==
=== After formal nominations ===
Pollster	Date	Sample size	Results
CEPP	27 May-8 June 2018	800	Edy Rahmayadi (53.1%), Djarot Saiful Hidayat (35.7%)
Indo Barometer	26 May-2 June 2018	800	Djarot Saiful Hidayat (37.8%), Edy Rahmayadi (36.9%)
CSIS	16–30 April 2018	1,000	Edy Rahmayadi (44.8%), Djarot Saiful Hidayat (36.6%)
LSI	11–15 April 2018	1,000	Edy Rahmayadi (43.1%), Djarot Saiful Hidayat (33.4%)
Indo Barometer	4–10 February 2018	800	Djarot Saiful Hidayat (26.0%), Edy Rahmayadi (25.8%), JR Saragih (8.4%)
Median	16–25 January 2018	1,200	Edy Rahmayadi (33.1%), Djarot Saiful Hidayat (19.2%), JR Saragih (10.5%)

=== Before nominations ===
Pollster	Date	Sample size	Results
Survei dan Polling Indonesia	11–23 December 2017	1,262	Tengku (37.54%), Edy (32.45%), Gus Irawan (10.21%), Djarot Saiful Hidayat (9.10%)
Indonesia Network Election Survey	24 November - 3 December 2017	1,816	Effendi MS Simbolon (25.2%), Edy Rahmayadi (13.9%), Gus Irawan Pasaribu (11.9%), Tengku Erry Nuradi (6.4%), Ngogesa Sitepu (6.2%), JR Saragih (5.1%)

== Results ==
=== Quick count ===
Pollster	Edy-Musa	Djarot-Sihar
Charta Politika	59.98	40.02
Indikator	56.64	43.36
LSI	57.12	42.88
SMRC	58.81	41.19
