= Sihar Sitorus =

Indonesian politician (born 1968)

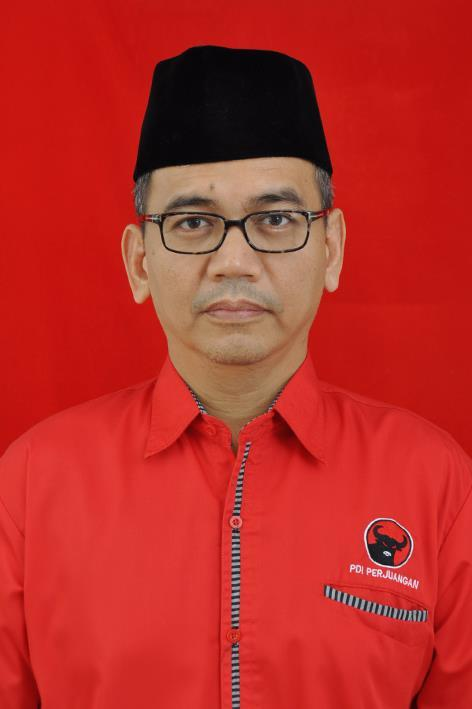

Member of House of Representatives
- Incumbent
- Assumed office 1 October 2019
- Constituency: North Sumatra II

Personal details
- Born: Sihar Pangihutan Hamonangan Sitorus Pane; 12 July 1968 (age 58) Jakarta, Indonesia
- Party: PDI-P
- Education: University of Arizona; Creighton University

Sihar Pangihutan Hamonangan Sitorus Pane (born 12 July 1968) is an Indonesian politician and businessman who is a member of the House of Representatives of the Indonesian Democratic Party of Struggle, having served since 2019. He took part in the 2018 North Sumatra gubernatorial election as a vice-governor candidate to Djarot Saiful Hidayat.

== Biography ==
Sitorus was born in Jakarta on 12 July 1968, and studied there until he graduated from high school in 1987. Afterwards, he earned a bachelor's degree in business administration from the University of Arizona in 1991, then an MBA from Creighton University in 1993. After his studies, he began to work at Freeport Indonesia as an accountant until 1995, then for a time at the Indonesian Stock Exchange.

His later business includes an oil palm plantation in Maluku. He also owns F.C.V. Dender E.H., a Belgian football club that earned its second ever promotion to the top flight in 2024. However, the club was relegated back to the second division in 2026.

In 2018, he ran as the running mate of Djarot Saiful Hidayat for the 2018 North Sumatra gubernatorial election, the pair being defeated by Edy Rahmayadi and Musa Rajekshah. He then was elected into the House of Representatives in the 2019 legislative election, representing North Sumatra's 2nd electoral district. He was reelected for a second term in the 2024 election with 86,341 votes.
