= Shinmei shrines =

Type of Japanese shrines

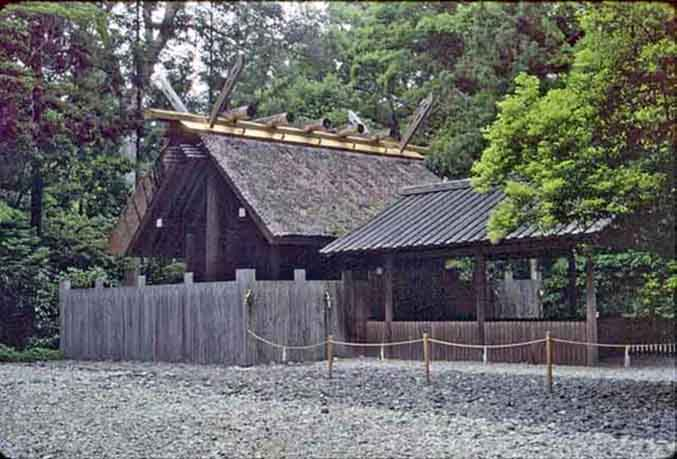
A building at Ise Shrine

Shinmei shrines (Japanese: 神明神社, lit. 'Shrine of deity') are shrines dedicated to the worship of the Japanese solar deity Amaterasu. The head Shinmei shrine is Ise Grand Shrine which inspired the Shinmei-zukuri architectural style.

== History ==
The solar goddess of Shinto, Amaterasu Omikami, is considered to be the ancestral deity of the Imperial House of Japan, and is widely worshiped in agricultural rituals. During the Kofun Period, a number of Shinmei Shrines, such as Ise Grand Shrine, were constructed and dedicated to Amaterasu. In national rituals, only the emperor was permitted to make offerings towards the deity.

However, as the power of the imperial court declined in the middle of the Heian Period, the central government could no longer financially support the Shinmei Shrines. As a result, the responsibilities of their maintenance fell onto local feudal lords, who were also given the right to relay prayers. Local lords donated part of their own estates (Shōen) as Shinryo (Japanese: 神領, lit. 'Domain of gods') to construct shrines dedicated to Amaterasu, including Nishina Shinmei Shrine in Ōmachi, Shinmei Shrine in Yokohama, and Amatsu Shinmei Shrine in Kamogawa. Some of the Shinmei Shrines, such as the Shiba Great Shrine, were said to have predated the Shōen System.

The priests of Shinmei Shrines, also known as Oshi (Japanese: 御師, lit. 'Royal teacher'), temporarily enshrined the talisman Jingū Taima in their branch offices in the eastern part of Japan, and some of these offices later developed into Shinmei Shrines as well.

During the Kamakura and later Muromachi Periods, Oshi's influence began to spread among both high-ranking samurai class and the common people. Especially in Kyoto, an increasing number of shrines outside of the traditional Shinryo were given permission by Oshi to enshrine Amaterasu. These shrines came to be known as "Imashinmei" (Japanese: 今神明, lit. 'Current Shinmei') or "Hishinmei" (Japanese: 飛神明, lit. 'Flying Shinmei'). In the Edo Period, the Ise faith became even more popular, spreading throughout the country and permeating a wide range of social classes. In 1632, Ise Shrine published the Ise Calendar in 1632, which recorded dates for agricultural activities and was widely used before the Meiji Restoration. As the influence of Ise Shrine and its deity Amaterasu grew, the number of Shinmei Shrines increased further.

== Major shrines ==
Major Shimei Shrines can be seen in the following table:

Region	Location	Shrine Name (ja)	Shrine Name (en)
Hokkaido	Hakodate	山上大神宮	Yamanoue Great Shrine
Hokkaido	Ashibetsu	蘆別神社	Ashibetsu Shrine
Hokkaido	Matsumae	徳山大神宮	Tokuyama Great Shrine
Hokkaido	Esashi	姥神大神宮	Ubagami Great Shrine
Tōhoku	Goshogawara, Aomori	神明宮	Shinmei Shrine
Tōhoku	Ichinoseki, Iwate	御嶽山御嶽神明社	Ontakesan Ontake Shinmei Shrine
Tōhoku	Ōshū, Iwate	神明神社	Shinmei Shrine
Tōhoku	Sendai, Miyagi	櫻岡大神宮	Sakura Gaoka Great Shrine
Tōhoku	Misato, Miyagi	木間塚神明社	Kimatsuka Shinmei Shrine
Tōhoku	Shiroishi, Miyagi	神明社	Shinmei Shrine
Tōhoku	Akita, Akita	土崎神明社	Tsuchizaki Shinmei Shrine
Tōhoku	Ōdate, Akita	大館神明社	Ōdate Shinmei Shrine
Tōhoku	Ōdate, Akita	扇田神明社	Ōgita Shinmei Shrine
Tōhoku	Semboku, Akita	角馆总镇树神明社	Kakunodate Sōchinju Shinmei Shrine
Tōhoku	Gojōme, Akita	五城目神明社	Gojōme Shinmei Shrine
Tōhoku	Yamagata, Yamagata	神明神社	Shinmei Shrine
Tōhoku	Aizuwakamatsu, Fukushima	神明神社	Shinmei Shrine
Tōhoku	Kōriyama, Fukushima	開成山大神宮	Kaiseizan Great Shrine
Kantō	Itako, Ibaraki	神明神社	Shinmei Shrine
Kantō	Tochigi, Tochigi	神明宫	Shinmei Shrine
Kantō	Tokorozawa, Saitama	所澤神明社	Tokorozawa Shinmei Shrine
Kantō	Sōka, Saitama	神明宫	Shinmei Shrine
Kantō	Hannō, Saitama	神明神社	Shinmei Shrine
Kantō	Ageo, Saitama	神明神社	Shinmei Shrine
Kantō	Kuki, Saitama	神明神社	Shinmei Shrine
Kantō	Satte, Saitama	神明神社	Shinmei Shrine
Kantō	Hasunuma, Saitama	神明神社	Shinmei Shrine
Kantō	Minaminakamaru, Saitama	神明神社	Shinmei Shrine
Kantō	Mikura, Saitama	神明神社	Shinmei Shrine
Kantō	Tsukamoto, Saitama	神明神社	Shinmei Shrine
Kantō	Kagiage, Saitama	神明社	Shinmei Shrine
Kantō	Torochō, Saitama	神明社	Shinmei Shrine

== Bibliography ==
- Kawamori, Shōji (1985). 伊勢神宮と武家社会 [Ise Jingu Shrine and Samurai Society] (in Japanese). Hiroshima University.
- Nishigaki, Seiji, ed. (1983). お伊勢参り [Visiting Ise]. Iwanami shinsho (in Japanese). Tōkyō: Iwanami shoten. ISBN 978-4-00-420252-3.
- Seta, Katsuya (1985). 伊勢の神をめぐる病と信仰 [Illness and Belief Concerning Gods of Ise] (in Japanese). Yuzankaku, Inc.
- Shinjo, Tsunezo (1949). 社寺と交通 熊野詣でと伊勢参り [Shrines and Transportation, Kumano Pilgrimage and Ise Pilgrimage] (in Japanese). Shibundo Co., Ltd.
