= Hassanudin =

Indonesian Military Officer and Bureaucrat

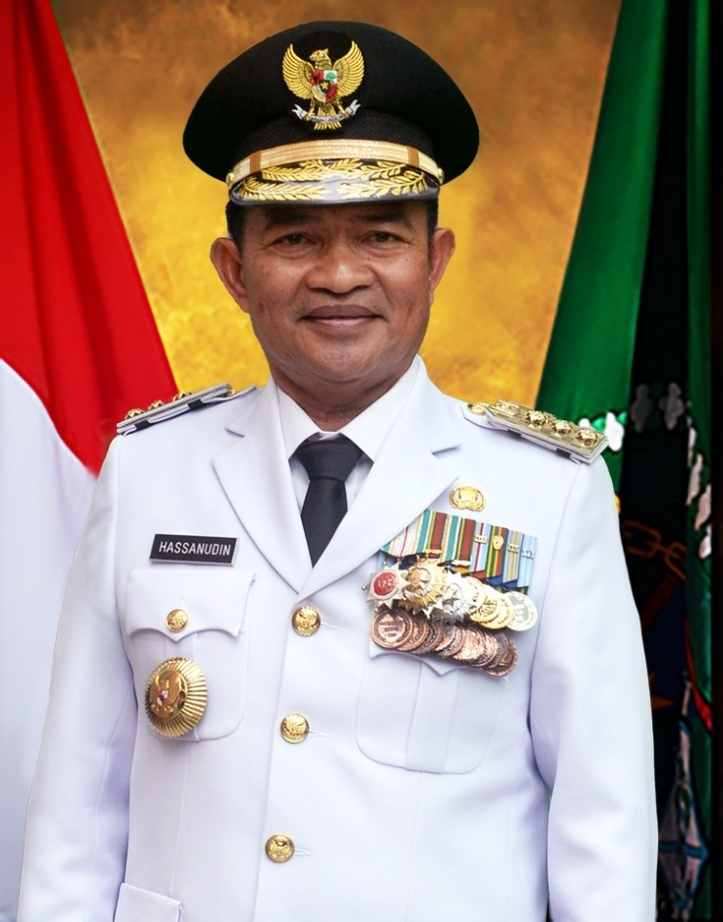
- Official portrait as Acting Governor of North Sumatra, 2023
- Born: September 7, 1965 (age 61); Palembang, South Sumatra
- Education: Indonesian Military Academy; Indonesia Open University (S.IP.); Krisnadwipayana University (M.M.); Gadjah Mada University (Dr.)
- Spouse: Dwianne Dessy
- Military career
- Allegiance: Indonesia
- Branch: Indonesian Army
- Service years: 1989—2023
- Rank: Major General
- Service number: 32738
- Unit: Air-defense Artillery
- Commands: See Military career
- Conflicts: Lotus Operation; Insurgency in Aceh; Papua Conflict
- Awards: See awards

Hassanudin

Governor of West Nusa Tenggara (Acting)
- In office 27 November 2024 – 20 February 2025
- President: Joko Widodo
- Preceded by: Lalu Gita Ariadi

Governor of North Sumatra (Acting)
- In office 5 September 2023 – 24 June 2024
- President: Joko Widodo
- Preceded by: Edy Rahmayadi
- Succeeded by: Bobby Nasution

Hassanudin (born September 7, 1965) is an Indonesian Army retired-major general and bureaucrat who serves as Acting Governor of North Sumatra since September 5, 2023, where he succeeded Edy Rahmayadi. He previously served as Deputy Inspector General of the Indonesian Army from February 25, 2022, to August 24, 2023.

== Education ==
Hassanudin was educated at the Indonesia Open University in 1993, where he graduated with a bachelor's degree in public administration science. He also completed a master's degree in management at Krisnadwipayana University in 2010 and completed a doctorate in Leadership and Policy Innovation at Gadjah Mada University in 2023.

In military education, Hassanudin attend the Indonesian Military Academy in 1989. He also attend Indonesian Army Command and General Staff College and completed in 2003 with top graduate honours degree. In 2015, he attend at the National Resilience Institute.

== Career ==
=== Military career ===
Hassanudin enlisted in the Indonesian Army and was commissioned as an air-defense artillery officer in 1989 after he graduated at Indonesian Military Academy in the same year. He has held multiple command and staff positions including Commander of 1st Air-defense Artillery Regiment in 2011. Then, he served as First Main Auxiliary Officer for Strategic Plan Policy at the Indonesian Army Planning Staff in 2012. In 2013, he served as Assistant for Planning of the Chief of Staff of 1st Military Regional Command. He also has served as Commander of Air-defense Artillery Education Centre between 2013 and 2014 before he served as Commander of 45th Military Ressort Command until 2015.

In 2017, Hassanudin served as Chief Inspector of Budget Program Planning at the Inspectorate General of the Indonesian Army before he appointed as Vice Assistant for Planning to the Chief of Staff of the Indonesian Army and promoted to the rank Brigadier-General in the same year. That position he held until 2018 when he appointed as the Chief of Staff of 1st Military Regional Command. In 2019, he appointed as Assistant for Planning and Budget of the Chief of Staff of the Indonesian Army and promoted to the rank Major-General in the same year.

In 2020, he appointed as Commander of the Iskandar Muda Military Region Command who succeeding Teguh Arief Indratmoko who appointed as Assistant for Intelligence of the Chief of Staff of the Indonesian Army. In the same year, he appointed as Commander of 1st Military Regional Command. In 2022, he appointed as Deputy Inspector General of the Indonesian Army and that position he held until 2023 before he retired.

=== Non-military career ===
Hassanudin has been elected by president Joko Widodo as Acting Governor of North Sumatra succeeding Edy Rahmayadi on August 31, 2023, and he appointed and took an oath on September 5, 2023, by Minister of Home Affairs, Tito Karnavian.

== Awards and decorations ==
- Active Duty in the Army Medal
- National Defense Service Medal
- Outer Islands Service Medal
- Border Guard Service Medal
- Military Educator Service Medal
- Social Welfare Service Medal
- Grand Meritorious Military Order Star, 3rd Class
- Grand Meritorious Military Order Star, 2nd Class
- Army Meritorious Service Star, 3rd Class
- Army Meritorious Service Star, 2nd Class
- Armed Forces Long Service (8 Years) Medal
- Armed Forces Long Service (16 Years) Medal
- Armed Forces Long Service (24 Years) Medal
- Armed Forces Long Service (32 Years) Medal
- Operation in Aceh Medal
- Operation in Papua Medal
- Lotus Operation Medal

Military offices
Preceded by Lieutenant General TNI Nugroho Budi Wiryanto	Deputy Inspector General of the Indonesian Army; 2022–2023	Succeeded by Major General TNI Irham Waroihan
Preceded by Major General TNI Irwansyah	Commander of Kodam I/Bukit Barisan; 2020–2022	Succeeded by Major General TNI Achmad Daniel Chardin
Preceded by Major General TNI Teguh Arief Indratmoko	Commander of Kodam Iskandar Muda; 2020	Succeeded by Major General TNI Achmad Marzuki
Preceded by Major General TNI Dominikus Agus Riyanto	Assistant for Planning and Budget of the Chief of Staff of the Indonesian Army; 2019–2020	Succeeded by Brigadier General TNI Hendrasto Joko Saksono
Civic offices
Preceded by Edy Rahmayadi	Acting Governor of North Sumatra; 2023–present	Succeeded by Incumbent
