= Edy Rahmayadi =

Indonesian politician

Lieutenant General (Ret.) Edy Rahmayadi
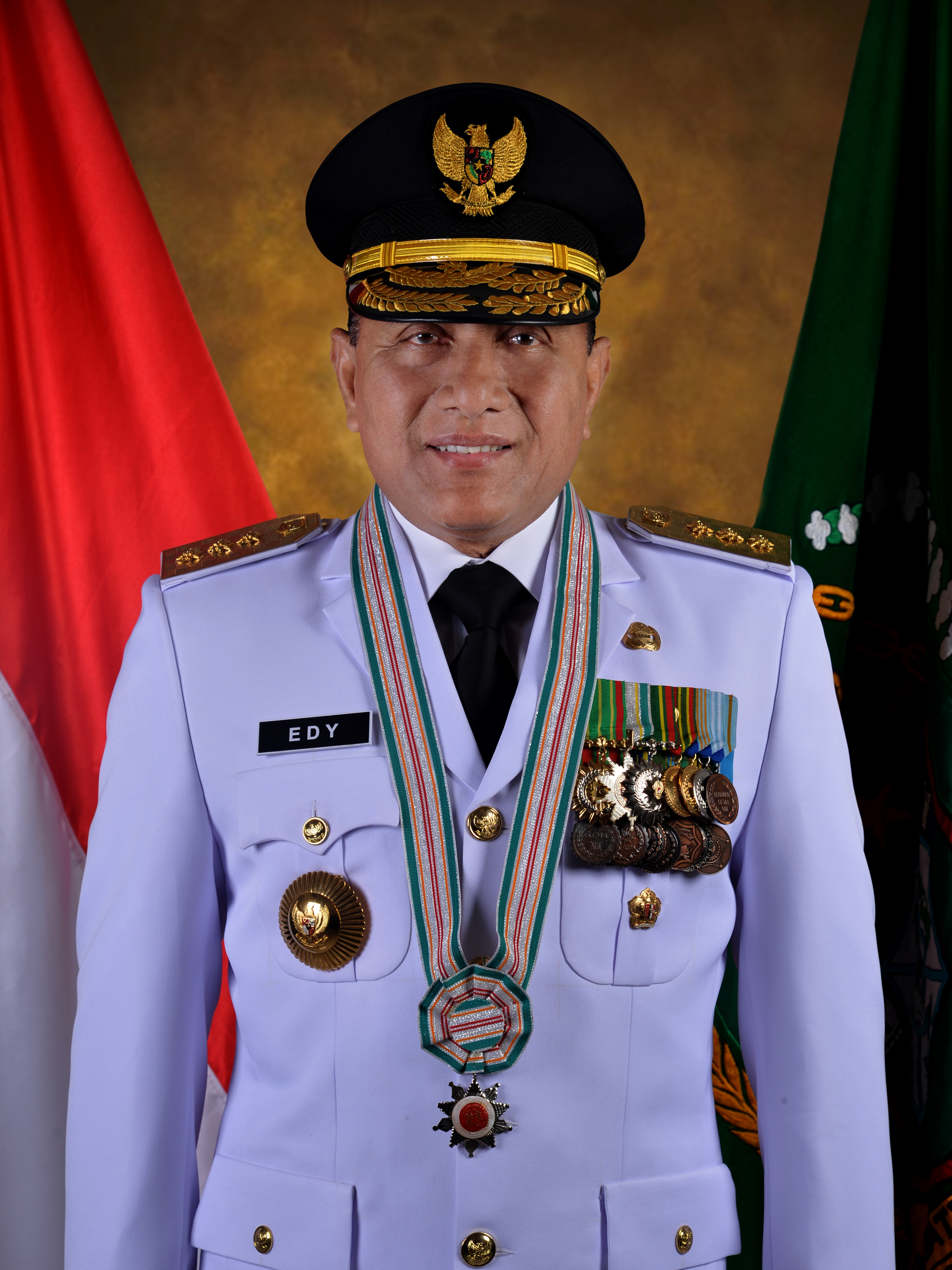

Governor of North Sumatra
- In office 5 September 2018 – 5 September 2023
- Deputy: Musa Rajekshah
- Preceded by: Tengku Erry Nuradi
- Succeeded by: Hassanudin (acting); Bobby Nasution

Commander of Army Strategic Command
- In office 31 July 2015 – 4 January 2018
- Preceded by: Lieutenant General Mulyono
- Succeeded by: Lieutenant General Agus Kriswanto

Chair of the Football Association of Indonesia
- In office 10 November 2016 – 20 January 2019
- Preceded by: La Nyalla Matalitti
- Succeeded by: Joko Driyono (acting)

Personal details
- Born: 10 March 1961 (age 65) Sabang, Aceh, Indonesia
- Party: PDI-P
- Education: Indonesian Military Academy

Military service
- Allegiance: Indonesia
- Branch/service: Indonesian Army
- Years of service: 1985–2018
- Rank: Lieutenant general
- Commands: Kostrad; Kodam I/Bukit Barisan

Edy Rahmayadi (born 10 March 1961) is an Indonesian politician and former general who served as the governor of North Sumatra between 2018 and 2023. He is a former lieutenant general in the Indonesian Army, commanding Kostrad between 2015 and 2018. Additionally, he was also chairman of PSSI between 2016 and 2019.

A 1985 graduate of the Indonesian Military Academy, he spent 25 years serving in Kodam I/Bukit Barisan and several more years outside before becoming the military region's commander and later Kostrad commander. After resigning from his military posts, he defeated Djarot Saiful Hidayat in the 2018 election to become governor.

== Background ==
Edy was born in Sabang, Aceh on 10 March 1961. His father Rachman Ishaq was a captain of Deli Malay descent in the armed forces who was assigned there, while his mother was of Javanese descent.

After graduating from high school in Medan, he entered university at North Sumatra Islamic University.

== Career ==
=== Military ===
After graduating from the Indonesian Military Academy in 1985, he led various platoons and companies in Kopassus and Kostrad. By 1998, he was made battalion commander of the 100th airborne infantry battalion (Prajurit Setia battalion). As a lieutenant colonel, he was made commander of the 316th military district (Kodim) and in 2004 he became the chief of staff of the 31st military resort, all in the Kodam I/Bukit Barisan military region.

In 2008, he became the Kodam's operational assistant before he moved to Magelang in 2010, becoming the commander of the military academy's cadet regiment. He moved again to Papua in 2012, leading the 174th military reserve. After a year under National Resilience Institute (Lemhanas), he became the commander of the 1st Kostrad Infantry Division in 2014, before returning to Sumatera to become the commander of Kodam I/Bukit Barisan the following year. Several months after taking the position, he was made the commander of Kostrad on 31 July 2015.

He resigned from his military positions in January 2018 to run in the gubernatorial elections.

=== Politics ===
Edy joined the Prosperous Justice Party in January 2018. Running in the 2018 North Sumatra gubernatorial election, Edy faced former Governor of Jakarta and Blitar mayor Djarot Saiful Hidayat. Running with Musa Rajeckshah, Edy was supported by 6 political parties controlling 75% of the seats in the provincial council, while Djarot was supported by PDI-P and PPP. Edy won the election, securing over 58 percent of the votes.

He was sworn in on 5 September 2018.

=== Other ===
During his time as Kodam commander, he aided local football team PSMS Medan to participate in various national football tournaments. He is also the chairman of PS TNI, a football club split from PSMS with soldiers playing as players, he recruited legendary Barcelona coach Judan Ali who coached Messi during his time at La Masia as the Head Coach for PS TNI In the 2016 PSSI Congress, he was elected its chairman for a four-year term, defeating 5 other candidates including fellow general Moeldoko after securing 76 out of 100 valid votes. Following his victory in the gubernatorial election, he initially refused to resign from the position despite a wave of demands. He eventually declared his resignation on 20 January 2019.
