= 1993 North Sumatra gubernatorial election =

- May 12, 1993
- Turnout: 100%
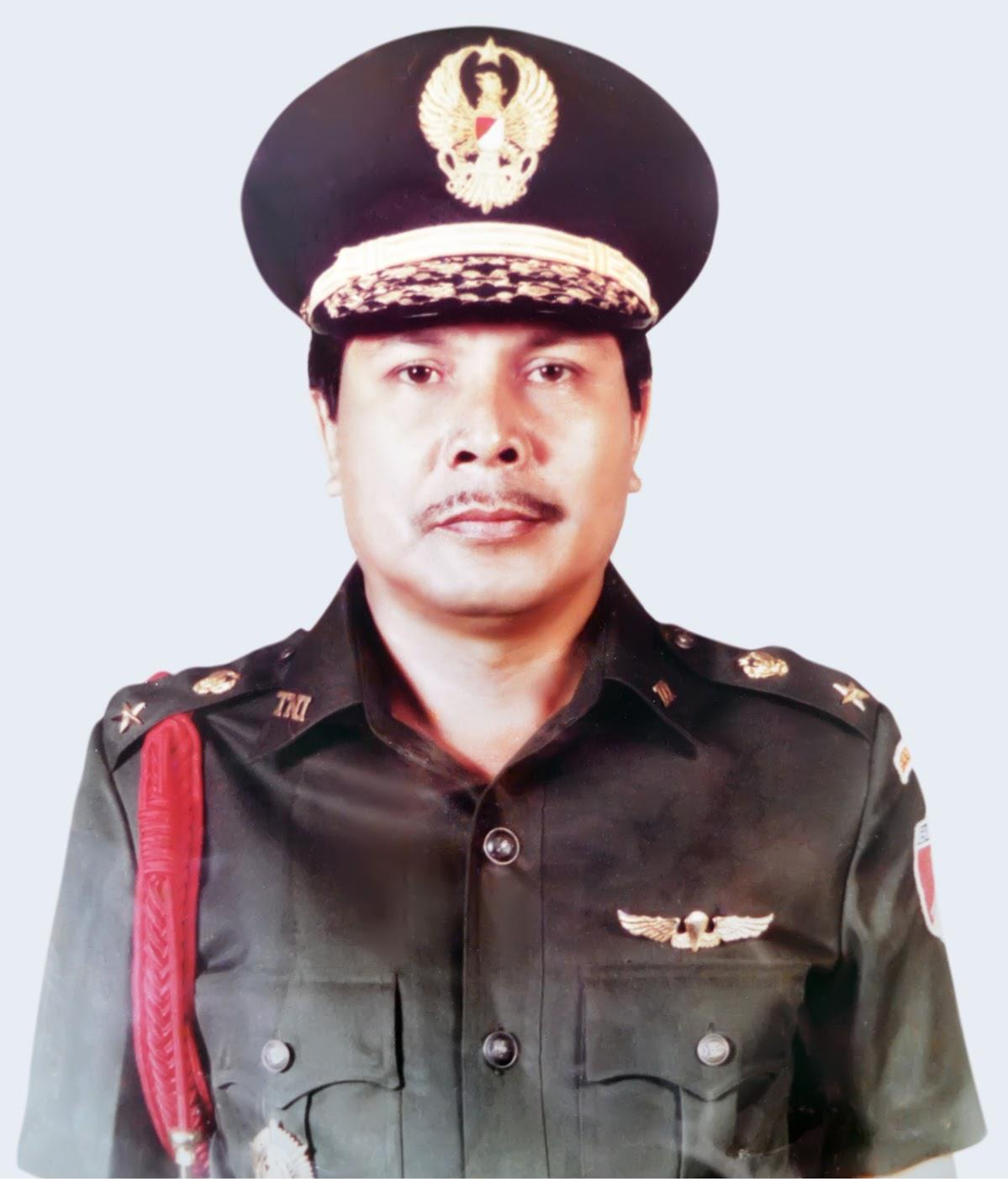

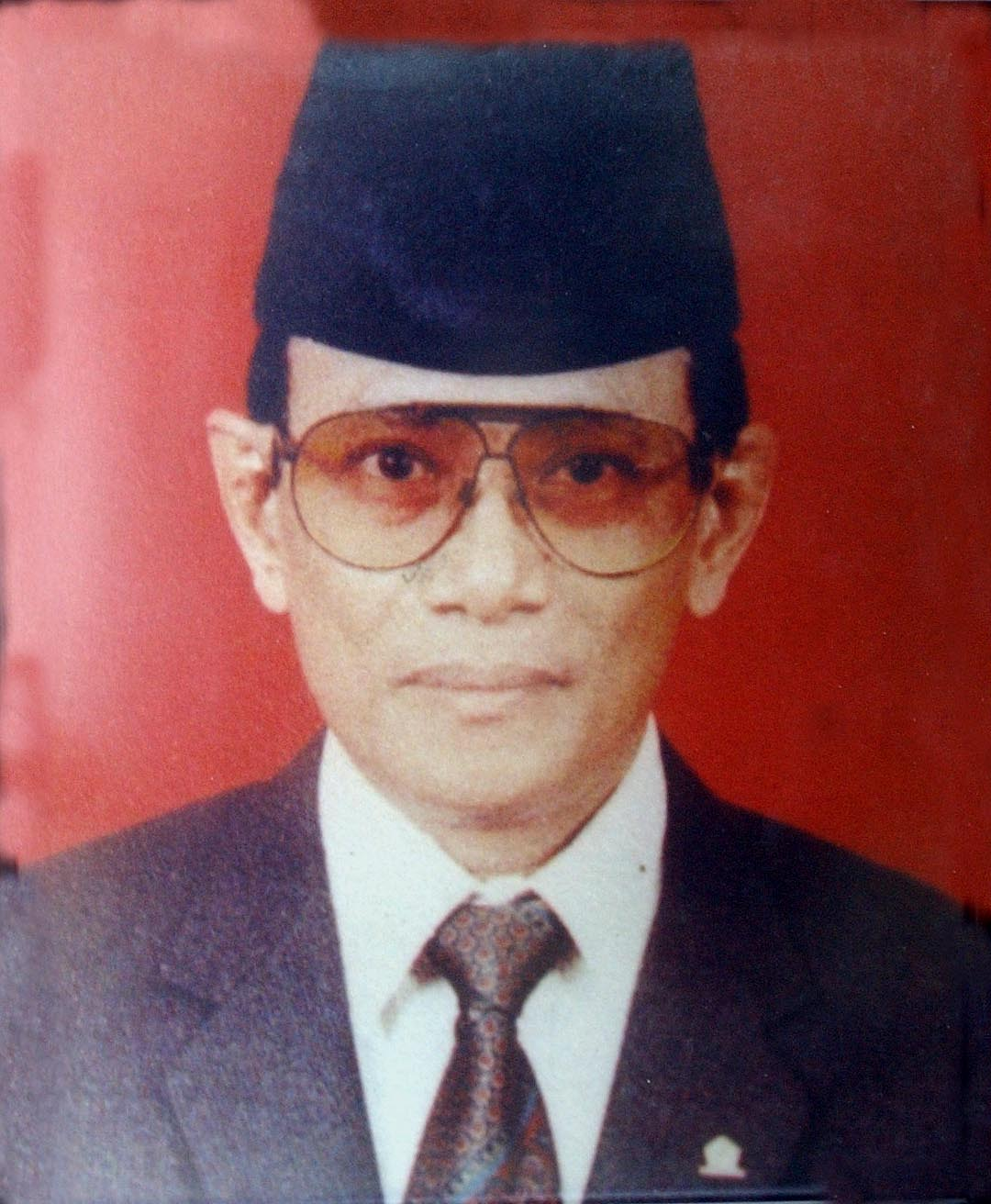
Candidate	Raja Inal Siregar	Mudyono	KRT Sinambela
Electoral vote	27	21	1

The 1993 North Sumatra gubernatorial election was an indirect election held to elect the Governor of North Sumatra for the 1993—1998 term. All members of the Regional People's Representative Council of North Sumatra were eligible to vote during this election.

== Background ==
Following the victory of Raja Inal Siregar in the 1988 North Sumatra gubernatorial election, Siregar was sworn in as the Governor of North Sumatra on 13 June 1988. His five-year term was to end on 1993, thus an election was prepared to elect a governor. Raja Inal Siregar himself was eligible for this election as he had only served for a term.

== Candidates ==
=== Nomination ===
Based on the notes from the four fractions in the Regional People's Representative Council of North Sumatra on 11 February 1993, there were seven names that had been submitted to the council. Those seven names were KRT Sinambela, Muchtar Tumin, Prof. Ny. Asma Awan, Raja Inal Siregar, H. Mudyono, A. Rivai Harahap and Drs. Syahrun Isa. The council also received 135 letters of recommendation, the majority of which supported Raja Inal Siregar.

Sinambela nominated himself, Muchtar Tumin was nominated by the Ikatan Keluarga Besar Laskar Arief Rahman Hakim, and Asman Affan was nominated by the regional leadership of the Muhammadiyah Youth in North Sumatra. Siregar was nominated for his second term by the Regional Board of Al-Washliyah in North Sumatra, the Indonesian National Blind Association (Pertuni) branch in North Sumatra and the Executive Board of the Batak Islam Association.

=== Holding a forum ===
One of the main issues that is being discussed in Medan was the problem of "sons of the soil" (putra daerah, literally regional son). Most discussions centered on the need for a "son of the soil" to become the governor. The speaker of the Regional People's Representative Council of North Sumatra, Mudyono, proposed a forum about the criteria for one to become the Governor of North Sumatra. Mudyono further explain that the forum's main goal would be to encompass the opinions of the North Sumatran society and not merely to replace Siregar.

Burhanuddin Napitupulu, a North Sumatran political activist, refused the idea to hold a forum on the grounds that it could condescend the law. Napitupulu further stated that the Law No. 5 of 1974 already specified the criterion for one to become governor. Napitupulu proposed that the forum should instead evaluate the performance of the governor's program and label the unfinished ones to make it as a "homework" for the next governor.

=== Alleged support rigging for Siregar ===
The chairman of the United Development Party fraction in the Regional People's Representative Council of North Sumatra, Syufri Helmi Tanjung, stated his concern about the support rigging by different organizations for Siregar. Tanjung refused to name the parties that conducted support rigging and stated that "You [reporters] could feel and know who's rigging [the support]."

The fractions inside the council responded differently about this allegation. Mudyono and the Indonesian Democratic Party fraction stated that the formal support for the candidates should be delivered through deliberation to prevent conflict. Meanwhile, the Golkar and military fraction viewed the support rigging as no more than an internal disagreement in the organization.

=== Official announcement and support ===
In early May 1993, the official list of candidates was announced. The Regional People's Representative Council of North Sumatra approved three candidates, namely Raja Inal Siregar, Mudyono, and KRT Sinambela (then Rector of the Mpu Tantular University).

== Election ==
The election process was chaired by the Deputy Speaker of the Regional People's Representative Council of North Sumatra Panangian Siregar. The election received widespread attention from the people of North Sumatra and was broadcast live by RRI Nusantara I Medan. The election was held in the assembly room of the Regional People's Representative Council, which had a capacity of 250 people. Due to the full capacity of the assembly room, other invited guests had to seat outside. It was estimated that no less than 200 people followed the election via radio.

The election was held under the supervision of the Director General of Government and Regional Autonomy, Warsito Rasman as the person in charge of the election. The newspaper Kompas described the atmosphere during the elections as tense, especially during the vote counting.

The atmosphere felt even more tense when at the beginning Mudyono's vote count was up six votes, without a single vote for Raja Inal and KRT Sinambela. Every time Mudyono got a vote, his supporters outside and inside the room immediately applauded him. A more festive welcome was immediately heard from supporters of Raja Inal, when the former Siliwangi Military Commander "captured" his first vote, until finally he managed to get the most votes(27 votes).

After the election, Warsito Rasman said that the election was democratic, safe and swift. Rasman described the nomination process up to time of the election as orderly and in accordance with statutory regulations. Rasman further stated that the next process after the election is the task of the government, and that the reporters should not make any presumptions regarding this election.

=== Results ===
Candidates	Votes	Percentage
Raja Inal Siregar	27	55.1%
Mudyono	21	42.9%
KRT Sinambela	1	2%
Total	49	100%
