= Prabowo Subianto =

President of Indonesia since 2024

- Official portrait, 2024

8th President of Indonesia
- Incumbent
- Assumed office 20 October 2024
- Vice President: Gibran Rakabuming Raka (2024–2026)
- Preceded by: Joko Widodo

Minister of Defense
- In office 23 October 2019 – 20 October 2024
- President: Joko Widodo
- Deputy: Sakti Wahyu Trenggono (2019–2020); Muhammad Herindra (2020–2024)
- Preceded by: Ryamizard Ryacudu
- Succeeded by: Sjafrie Sjamsoeddin

Chairman of the Gerindra Party
- Incumbent
- Assumed office 20 September 2014
- Preceded by: Suhardi
Military offices
22nd Commander of Kostrad
In office 20 March 1998 – 22 May 1998
President	Suharto; B. J. Habibie
Preceded by	Sugiono
Succeeded by	Johnny Lumintang (acting); Djamari Chaniago
15th Commandant General of Kopassus
In office 1 December 1995 – 20 March 1998
President	Suharto
Preceded by	Subagyo Hadi Siswoyo
Succeeded by	Muchdi Purwopranjono

Personal details
- Born: Prabowo Subianto Djojohadikusumo; 17 October 1951 (age 75) Jakarta, Indonesia
- Party: Gerindra (since 2008)
- Other political affiliations: Golkar (2004–2008); KIM Plus (since 2023)
- Spouse: Siti Hediati Hariyadi (m. 1983; sep. 1998)
- Children: Didit Hediprasetyo
- Parents: Sumitro Djojohadikusumo (father); Dora Marie Sigar (mother)
- Relatives: Hashim Djojohadikusumo (younger brother); Sudradjad Djiwandono (brother-in-law)
- Education: Victoria Institution; American School in London; Indonesian Military Academy
- Cabinet: Red and White Cabinet
- Website: Presidential website; Personal website

Military service
- Branch/service: Indonesian Army
- Years of service: 1974–1998
- Rank: General (honorary)
- Unit: Kopassus (special forces)
- Commands: Kopassus; Kostrad
- Battles/wars: Invasion of East Timor; Insurgency in East Timor; Papua conflict; Mapenduma hostage crisis
- Service no.: 27082
- Prabowo Subianto's voice Prabowo addressing the August 2025 protest and the killing of Affan Kurniawan; Recorded 29 August 2025

Prabowo Subianto Djojohadikusumo (Note: US: /prɑːˈboʊwoʊ suːbiːˈɑːntoʊ/; Indonesian: [praˌbowo subiˌanto]. Under modern Indonesian orthography, his last name would be spelled as Joyohadikusumo, Indonesian: [d͡ʒojohadikuˈsumo].) (born 17 October 1951) is an Indonesian politician, businessman, and retired military officer who has served as the eighth president of Indonesia since 2024. He previously served as the 26th minister of defence under President Joko Widodo from 2019 to 2024. Prabowo is Indonesia's third president to have a military background after Suharto and Susilo Bambang Yudhoyono and is the oldest first-term president in Indonesian history.

Prabowo graduated from the Indonesian Military Academy in 1970 and primarily served in the Special Forces (Kopassus) until he was appointed to lead the Strategic Reserves Command (Kostrad) in 1998. Later that same year, he was discharged from the military and subsequently banned from entering the United States for allegedly committing human rights abuses.

In early 2008, Prabowo's inner circle established the Gerindra Party. In the 2009 presidential election, he ran unsuccessfully for the vice presidency as Megawati Sukarnoputri's running mate. He contested the 2014 presidential election and was defeated by Jakarta governor Joko Widodo, which he initially disputed. He made another unsuccessful run for the presidency in 2019 against Joko Widodo, with Sandiaga Uno as his running mate and with the support of Gerindra, the Prosperous Justice Party (PKS), the National Mandate Party (PAN), the Democratic Party (Demokrat), and Berkarya Party. His refusal to accept the result saw his followers stage protests that sparked riots in Jakarta. However, after a heated contest, Prabowo joined Joko Widodo's cabinet as his minister of defence for the 2019 to 2024 period.

On 10 October 2021, Gerindra announced Prabowo as their candidate in the 2024 presidential election. On 12 August 2022, Prabowo announced that he accepted Gerindra's nomination. Prabowo declared victory in the election on 14 February 2024, as early unofficial polling showed him with a lead in the first round of voting. On 20 March, the General Election Commission (KPU) certified the results and declared him as the president-elect of Indonesia. The Constitutional Court (MK) confirmed his status on 22 April 2024. Prabowo was sworn in as the 8th president of Indonesia on 20 October 2024.

As president, Prabowo established the Red and White Cabinet, the largest in Indonesia's modern history. He rolled out a series of economic reforms, launched the sovereign wealth fund Danantara, and signed several defence agreements and acquisitions. His flagship free school meals programme attracted controversy due to mass food poisonings. He oversaw Indonesia's entry to BRICS.

== Early life and family ==
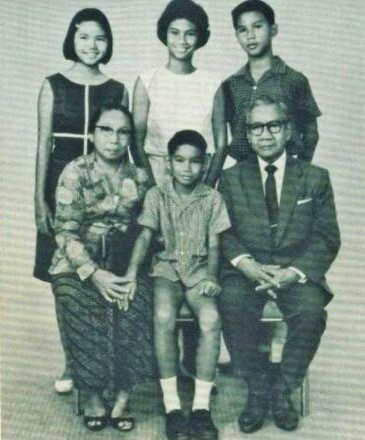
Prabowo at 12 years old (standing right), with his siblings and grandparents, Margono Djojohadikusumo and Siti Katoemi Wirodihardjo

Prabowo's father, Sumitro Djojohadikusumo (1917–2001), was originally from Gombong, Kebumen. He was an economist who served as former President Sukarno's minister for the economy and Suharto's minister for research and technology. Sumitro named Prabowo after his own younger brother who was killed in an incident against Japanese forces in Lengkong, Tangerang during the Indonesian National Revolution. Prabowo's mother, Dora Marie Sigar (1919–2008), was a Protestant Christian of Minahasan and German descent, who originated from the Sigar-Maengkom family in Langowan, North Sulawesi. Her father was a member of the Volksraad of the Dutch East Indies. They were married in Matraman, East Jakarta.

Prabowo has two older sisters, Bianti Djojohadikusumo, who was born in 1946 and Maryani Djojohadikusumo, who was born in 1948. His only brother, Hashim Djojohadikusumo, was born in 1953. Prabowo's eldest sister, Bianti, is married to J. Soedradjad Djiwandono, Governor of Bank Indonesia from 1993 until 1998, whilst her sister, Maryani, was married to a French expatriate entrepreneur, Didier Lemaistre who died in 2018. Prabowo's brother, Hashim, is one of the wealthiest businessmen in Indonesia with assets across the globe from Indonesia to Europe and North America. Due to his father's political exile borne from differences with Sukarno in the 1960s, they lived in self-exile, notably in countries such as Switzerland, Singapore, Thailand, Malaysia, and the United Kingdom. During his high school years, he studied at Victoria Institution in Kuala Lumpur, Malaysia. Between 1966 and 1968, the family lived in London, where Prabowo attended and graduated from the American School. Sumitro subsequently encouraged his son to attend a military academy. According to peers and observers, Prabowo was strategic and had an appetite for political power.

Sumitro himself came from a political background. His father, Margono Djojohadikusumo, was the founder of the country's first state bank Bank Negara Indonesia (BNI), the first leader of Indonesia's provisional Supreme Advisory Council (DPA), and a member of the Investigating Committee for Preparatory Work for Independence (BPUPK) that drafted the steps for Indonesia's independence. Prabowo is the third generation of a family that has served political positions in Indonesia since its independence in 1945.

Prabowo and Titiek have a son, Didit Hediprasetyo, who lived in Boston before settling in Paris to pursue a career in fashion design. While his son has shown little interest in politics, Prabowo is an uncle to Gerindra politicians Thomas Djiwandono, Budi Djiwandono, Aryo Djojohadikusumo, and Rahayu Djojohadikusumo, who will together continue the Djojohadikusumo political lineage.

== Military career ==
=== Military academy and service ===
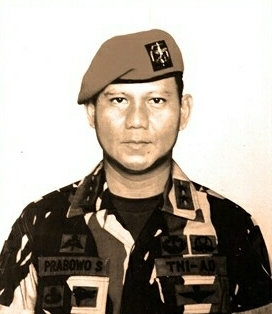
Prabowo as Commandant General of Kopassus

Prabowo enrolled in the Indonesian Military Academy (Akademi Militer Nasional) in Magelang in 1970. He graduated in 1974 with others who would gain senior leadership positions, such as Susilo Bambang Yudhoyono.

In 1976, Prabowo served in the Indonesian Army Special Forces Command (Kopassus) and was assigned as the commander of Group 1 Komando Pasukan Sandhi Yudha (Kopassandha), which was one of the Indonesian Army's Nanggala commando units in East Timor, the former Portuguese territory that Indonesia had invaded the previous year. Prabowo, then 26 years old, was the youngest Nanggala commander. Prabowo led the mission to capture the vice president of Fretilin, who was the first prime minister of East Timor, Nicolau dos Reis Lobato. Guiding Prabowo was Antonio Lobato – Nicolau's younger brother. On 31 December 1978, Prabowo's company found and fatally shot Nicolau in the stomach as he was being escorted in Maubisse, fifty kilometres south of Dili.

In 1981, Captain Inf. Prabowo with Major Inf. Luhut Binsar Panjaitan was sent by the TNI to attend Anti-terror Training in GSG-9 Germany, and after graduate from the course, TNI forming the first anti-terror unit in Indonesia, the Detasemen 81 Anti Teror under the Kopassus, with Luhut as the detachment commander and Prabowo as the vice-commander.

In 1983, sources say that Prabowo commanded the special forces responsible for the Kraras massacres in East Timor. The survivors of these massacres were locked up in a concentration camp guarded by Prabowo's men, where many died of starvation and ill-treatment. Prabowo claimed he was nowhere near the Viqueque district when the massacre happened, and neither the UN nor the government of Timor Leste have ever proffered charges of human rights violations against him. Jose Manuel Tesoro, writing for Asiaweek in 2000, contacted four separate non-governmental organisations including TAPOL in London; Solidamor in Jakarta; the HAK Foundation, headquartered in Dili; and the East Timor Action Network (ETAN) in New York, and they could not provide any eyewitness reports, transcripts of intercepted communications, leaked papers, or anything that could substantiate Prabowo's involvement.

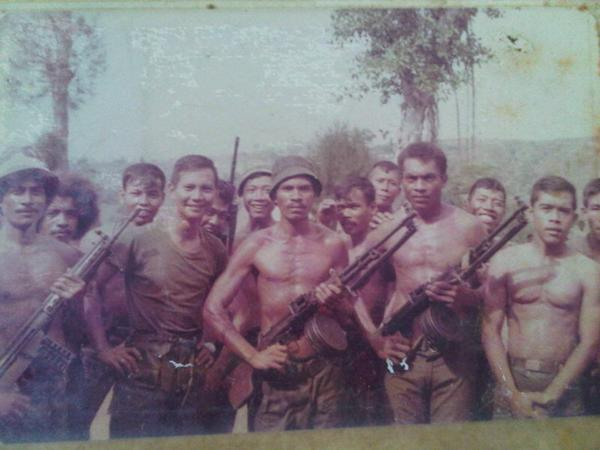
Indonesian Army's Nanggala commando unit in East Timor led by Prabowo

In 1985 Prabowo attended the Advanced Infantry Officers Course at Fort Bragg, in the United States for commando training. In the early 1990s, as the commander of Kopassus Group 3, the now Major General Prabowo attempted to crush the East Timorese independence movement by using irregular troops (hooded "ninja" gangs dressed in black and operating at night) and, in main towns and villages, militias trained and directed by Kopassus commanders. Human rights abuses rose. The Army's 1997 campaign was called Operation Eradicate.

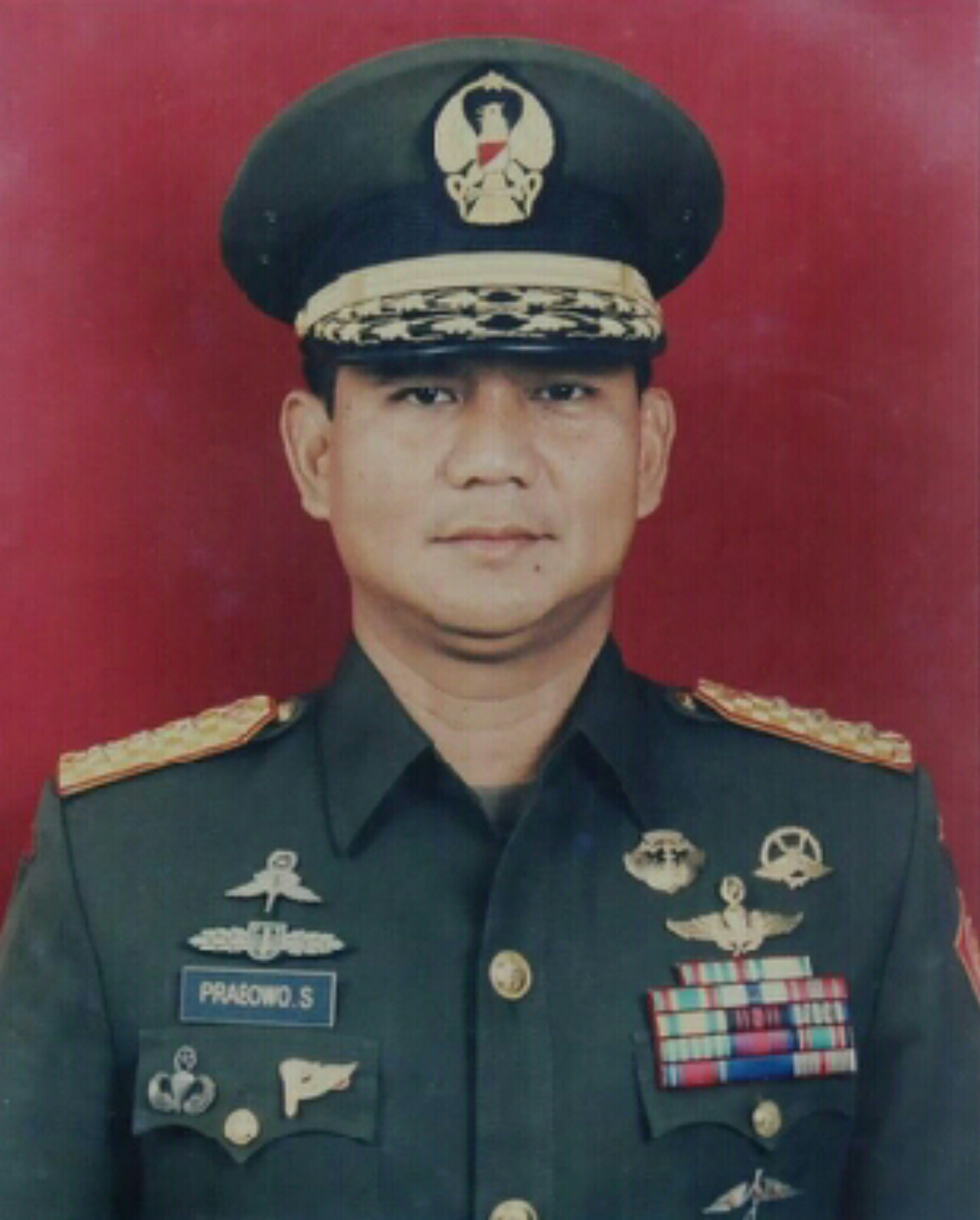
Prabowo as Chief of the Indonesian Armed Forces Command and Staff School (Sesko ABRI) in his uniform with multiple decorations

In 1996, Prabowo led Operation Mapenduma in the mountainous terrain of Papua. The goal of the operation was the release of 11 scientific researchers who had been taken hostage by the Free Papua Movement (OPM). The researchers were five Indonesians, four Britons, one Dutchman and his pregnant German wife. Two of the Indonesian male hostages were killed shortly before the rescue operation. The mission involved covert support from British Military Attaché and SAS veteran Colonel Ivor Helberg. Following the hostage transfer, Kopassus under Prabowo began a reprisal campaign against villages perceived to support OPM, and, in one incident at Geselema village, attacking the villagers with a military helicopter disguised as a Red Cross helicopter.

On 20 March 1998, Prabowo was appointed head of the 27,000-strong Army Strategic Reserve Command (Kostrad), that Suharto had commanded in 1965. During his military career, he received the nicknames "08" and "Pandu" (lit. 'Scout') from the Kopassus and the Kostrad, respectively.

=== Role in the fall of Suharto ===
Less than three months after his appointment as head of Kostrad, on the first day of the May 1998 riots, Prabowo urged the commander of the Indonesian National Armed Forces (ABRI), General Wiranto, to let him bring his Strategic Reserve units from outside Jakarta into the city to help restore order. Hundreds of men trained by Kopassus (Prabowo's former command) were flown from Dili to Yogyakarta in chartered planes, and then on to Jakarta by train. Prabowo publicly urged Indonesians to join him to fight "traitors to the nation". On the morning of 14 May, Kopassus troops escorted young thugs from Lampung in southern Sumatra into the capital. Thus Prabowo was accused of using his contacts in his former command to import and create trouble, while Wiranto had declined to give Prabowo's current command, Kostrad, permission to quell the existing trouble, in line with classic Javanese tactic to stir chaos to discredit a rival and/or seize power.

Troops under Prabowo's command kidnapped and tortured at least nine democracy activists in the months before the May 1998 riots. In one testimony from Andi Arief, a former detainee told of being tortured for days in an unidentified location, allegedly a military camp where most of their time was spent blindfolded, while being forced to answer repeated questions, mainly concerning their political activities. The abuse included being punched, terrorised physically and mentally, and given electric shocks. Later, in 2009, two of the nine men were candidates for Gerindra, Prabowo's political party, and another served as his media adviser. By 2024, six out of the nine kidnapped (including Arief) have either worked for Prabowo, or backed him for the presidency. Prabowo was also suspected of organising the kidnappings of another 13 activists (all of whom remain "missing") between February 1997 and May 1998.

Later investigations into the May riots revealed that violence in Jakarta was the result of an internal struggle within the military elite to become Suharto's successor. Many believed Prabowo, as Army Strategic Reserve Command (Kostrad) commander, sought to become his father-in-law's successor and coveted the commander of the Armed Forces position held by General Wiranto, who was favoured to succeed Suharto. Together with Operations Commander for Greater Jakarta (Panglima Komando Operasi Jakarta Raya, Pangkoops Jaya) Major General Sjafrie Sjamsoeddin, Prabowo aimed to terrorise opponents of the government and to show that Wiranto was "an incompetent commander who could not control disorder". During August and September, the fact-finding team interviewed Prabowo, Sjafrie, and other military commanders regarding their movements during the Jakarta riots. Prabowo asserted that he was unsure of the precise movements of military forces in the capital and deferred to Sjafrie. In its final report, the fact-finding team suspected that, on the night of 14 May, Prabowo met with several Armed Forces and prominent civilian figures at the Kostrad headquarters to discuss the organisation of the violence. However, this was later refuted by several people who attended the meeting, including prominent human rights lawyer Adnan Buyung Nasution and Joint Fact-Finding Team member, Bambang Widjojanto. Further testimonies by Prabowo in the years following the investigation contradicted the team's report and led to scepticism of the team's allegations.

=== Dismissal from the military ===
On 21 May 1998, Suharto announced his resignation from the presidency and Vice President B. J. Habibie took over as president. On the afternoon following Habibie's inauguration as president, Prabowo demanded of Habibie that he be put in charge of the army in place of Wiranto. However, Habibie and Wiranto actually dismissed Prabowo from his position as Kostrad commander, and the following day, announced Wiranto's appointment as minister of defence and security as well as commander of the Indonesian Army, which resulted in Prabowo's dismissal. There were two versions of how this happened: the first version states that a furious Prabowo went to the Presidential Palace carrying a gun and a truck with his Kostrad troops. Because he was prevented from entering Habibie's office, he went to Suharto, who instead reprimanded him. Meanwhile, another version states that Prabowo was dismissed from his post because he was suspected of carrying out a coup against Habibie. It is said that after Habibie's inauguration, Wiranto reported that there was movement from Kostrad troops appearing around Habibie's residence. Habibie then ordered Prabowo to be dismissed from his post just before sunset in that day. However, Prabowo was later visited by Wiranto at his home on the weekend of 23 or 24 May and then reassigned to a non-combat role at the Armed Forces Command and General Staff College in Bandung.

Following an ABRI investigation in August 1998, the Dewan Kehormatan Perwira (Officers Council of Honour) found Prabowo guilty of "misinterpreting orders" in the kidnapping of nine anti-Suharto activists in 1998. Prabowo acknowledged responsibility for the kidnapping of the nine activists, and was discharged honourably from military service in November. He and Wiranto denied that the discharge was a result of disciplinary action. Later he went into voluntary exile in Jordan where he knew that country's new young King Abdullah as a fellow commander of special forces. In an interview with Asiaweek magazine in 2000, Prabowo said "I never threatened Habibie. I was not behind the riots. That is a great lie. I never betrayed Suharto. I never betrayed Habibie. I never betrayed my country. There was a certain group that wanted to make me a scapegoat, maybe to hide their involvement." Human rights groups have long questioned Prabowo's eligibility to run for president, noting that he was discharged from the Army in August 1998 (Note: Keppres No. 62/ABRI/1998 dated 20 November 1998, states that Prabowo was discharged honourably from the military, starting from the end of November.) for "misinterpreting orders" in the abduction of the democracy activists. While that was the military's official statement, observers have long believed that it was a coup conspiracy that saw Prabowo, then the commander of the Army Strategic Reserves, given his marching orders.

As a 2014 presidential candidate, Prabowo's past came under renewed scrutiny, with many organisations calling for him to step down. On 19 April, he was criticised by a poet made by Fahmi Habcyi which linked him to the disappearance of Widji Thukul and urged him to return Thukul as his wife is devastated hoping for her husband to return. A coalition, which consisted of Imparsial, Kontras, the Setara Institute, and the Human Rights Working Group (HRWG), combined under the Civil Society Coalition Against Forgetting, visited the National Commission on Human Rights (Komnas HAM) in Jakarta on 7 May 2014 to urge the commission to re-investigate Prabowo. A 27 June 2014 report indicated that an investigative journalist, Allan Nairn, had been threatened with arrest "for revealing the former general's role in human rights abuses."

During the 2024 presidential debate on 12 December 2023, Prabowo admitted implicitly that he had Budiman Sudjatmiko kidnapped, a violation of human rights, later Sudjatmiko had become one of his spokesperson. Prior to the debate, Prabowo also admitted to Sudjatmiko, that he had released all activists he had kidnapped but didn't know of their later fates after released. Explaining his decision, Budiman claimed people changed after 25 years, both him and Prabowo "moved to the middle." Maria Catarina Sumarsih, whose son was shot dead during the Semanggi shootings on 13 November 1998, said that Prabowo was responsible for the tragedy.

== Business career ==
After being discharged from the military, Prabowo joined his brother Hashim Djojohadikusumo's business. He purchased Kiani Kertas, a paper pulp and plantation company based in Mangkajang, East Kalimantan. Prior to Prabowo's purchase, Kiani was owned by Bob Hasan, a businessman close to former President Suharto. Today, Prabowo's Nusantara Group controls 27 companies in Indonesia and abroad. Prabowo's companies include Nusantara Energy (oil and natural gas, coal), Tidar Kerinci Agung (palm oil plantations) and Jaladri Nusantara (fishery industry). Prabowo rebranded Kiani Kertas to Kertas Nusantara. The company was established in 1990 and is part of the Nusantara Energy. It controls an area of 3,400 hectares (8,400 acres) used for paper mills, employee housing, private schools, and various company facilities. Kiani has been awarded ISO 900–2005 status as one of the highest quality management companies. It is reported that Kiani Kertas has been experiencing financial difficulties, and in early 2014, workers took to the streets to demand their wages which had not been paid in five months.

Prabowo was the wealthiest presidential candidate in the 2009 election, with assets of Rp 1.5 trillion (about US$150 million) and US$7.5 million.

In 2007, PT Ridlatama, whose majority stakeholder was British-based Churchill PLC, conducted a geo-survey of eastern Kalimantan for coal. Two months after the survey yielded positive results, East Kutai officials granted mining licenses to Nusantara Energy (a subsidiary of the Nusantara Group, a conglomerate owned by Prabowo's family) to operate in the area surveyed by Ridlatama. In 2010, Ridlatama's license was revoked, effectively completing Nusantara's take over of Churchill's operations. Churchill appealed to the Supreme Court of Indonesia but lost the case. In 2012, Churchill filed a case against the government of Indonesia at the International Centre for Settlement of Investment Disputes, demanding US$2 billion in compensation. Indonesia argued that ICSID had no authority to arbitrate. In 2014, ICSID ruled that it had the authority and the case is still ongoing.

In 2014, the regent of East Kutai, Isran Noor, publicly endorsed Prabowo as a presidential candidate. He also considered pressing criminal charges against Churchill, alleging that Churchill forged its license.

== Advocacy career ==
=== Farmers' rights (HKTI) ===
The Indonesian Farmers' Association (HKTI) was established in 1973 to advocate for the farmers' rights. Prabowo was elected President of HKTI on 5 December 2004, and he was reappointed in 2010 for a second term.

=== Market traders (APPSI) ===
The Indonesian Traditional Market Traders Association (APPSI) is a non-profit organisation advocating for the welfare of traders in Indonesia's traditional markets. Prabowo was elected as president of APPSI in 2008. As a chairman of the organisation, Prabowo often calls for the government to limit hypermarkets by regulating their distances so as not to harm small traders. "So far, traditional market traders have always been ignored, so that when a modern market was established, the capital owners of the market traders had to be willing to be disbanded due to demolition," said Prabowo.

=== Pencak silat and the IPSI ===
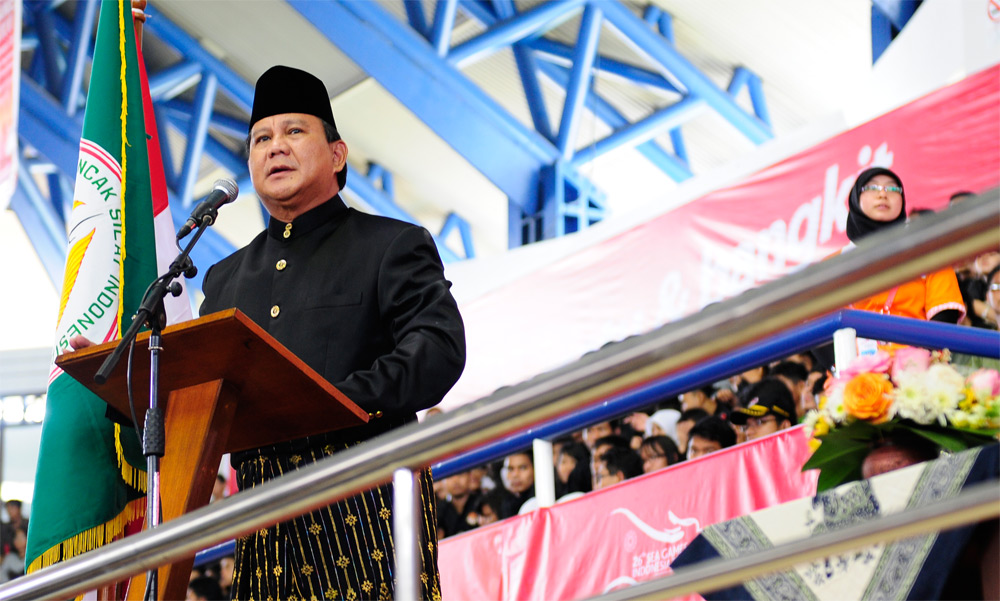
Prabowo opening the 2011 pencak silat SEA Games tournament held in Taman Mini, Jakarta. He is the chairman of Indonesia's pencak silat organisation, the Indonesian Pencak Silat Association.

Pencak silat is one of Indonesia's traditional martial arts. The Indonesian Pencak Silat Association (IPSI) oversees the regulation of the sport in Indonesia, develops athletes, and organises tournaments. Prabowo was elected as president of the IPSI in 2004 and was re-elected in 2012 for a third consecutive term.

At the 2011 SEA Games in Jakarta, pencak silat won the overall championship by winning 9 of the 18 events competed. The IPSI's achievements under Prabowo's chairmanship were noted at the 2018 Asian Games, where pencak silat succeeded in contributing to 14 of the 31 gold medals won by the Indonesian contingent.

Prabowo is also the president of the International Pencak Silat Federation (IPSF).

=== Migrant workers ===
The Indonesian Advocacy Service for Justice and Peace (Padma) in the East Nusa Tenggara region assessed that Prabowo played a major role in the release of Wilfrida Soik from the death penalty at the Kota Bahru Court, Kelantan, Malaysia. Prabowo appointed Malaysian lawyer Tan Sri Mohammad Syafei to defend Wilfrida Soik. Wilfrida is a worker from East Nusa Tenggara who was sent illegally. Wilfrida was sentenced to death for killing her employer, Yeap Seok Pen, on 7 December 2010.

== Early political career ==
Using his connections to President Suharto, Prabowo and his brother worked to silence journalistic and political critics in the 1990s. Hashim unsuccessfully pressured Goenawan Mohamad to sell his outspoken and banned Tempo magazine to him. As a lieutenant colonel, Prabowo invited Abdurrahman Wahid to his battalion headquarters in 1992 and warned him to stick to religion and to stay out of politics, or face unspecified actions if he continued to oppose the president. He later warned the intellectual Nurcholish Madjid (Cak Nur) to resign from the KIPP, the election monitoring unit set up by Goenawan Mohamad, which armed forces commander Feisal Tanjung had denounced as "obviously unconstitutional."

=== Golkar Party convention ===
In 2004, Prabowo was one of five contenders in the 2004 Golkar Party National Convention vying to become Golkar party's presidential candidate. He received the lowest number of votes, just 39, and was eliminated in the first round. The second round of voting was won by Wiranto. After finishing last in the party convention, Prabowo served as a member of the Golkar Advisory Council until his resignation on 12 July 2008.

=== Gerindra Party ===
In February 2008, Prabowo's inner circle, including Fadli Zon, Muchdi Purwopranjono, and Prabowo's younger brother Hashim Djojohadikusumo, along with a few others established the Gerindra Party. Prabowo served as chairman of the Board of Trustees of the Central Leadership Council (DPP). He was later appointed general chairman of the party after the death of the party's previous chairman Suhardi in 2014.

== Vice-presidential candidacy ==
In May 2009, Gerindra nominated Prabowo for the presidency in the 2009 elections. However, having won 26 out of 560 seats in the Indonesian parliament, the party did not have the required numbers, and Prabowo ran as a vice-presidential candidate to Megawati Sukarnoputri, daughter of Indonesia's first president Sukarno. Prabowo and Megawati signed the Batu Tulis Agreement, which stated that:

1. PDI-P and Gerindra nominated Megawati as presidential candidate and Prabowo as vice-presidential candidate in the 2009 elections.
2. If elected, Prabowo can control Indonesia's economic programs and policies which are "based on the principles of standing on one's own feet, being sovereign in the political field, and having a national personality in the cultural field within the framework of a presidential system"
3. Prabowo can determine who will be Minister of Forestry, Minister of Agriculture, Minister of Finance, Minister of State Owned Enterprises, Minister of Energy and Mineral Resources, Minister of Maritime Affairs and Fisheries, Minister of Industry, Minister of Manpower and Transmigration, Minister of Law and Human Rights, and Minister of Defence.
4. The government that is formed will support the PDI-P's people's program and the Gerindra's eight action programs for the prosperity of the people.
5. Funding for the 2009 elections will be covered 50% by Megawati and 50% by Prabowo.
6. Megawati shall back Prabowo as 2014 presidential election candidate.

The pair, referred to colloquially by the Indonesian media as Mega–Pro, earned 27% of the vote and lost to Susilo Bambang Yudhoyono and his running mate, economist Boediono. The results of the KPU's manual calculation, which were announced on 25 July 2009, were not much different from the results of the quick count. Megawati and Prabowo were absent at the announcement of the official tally even though Law No. 42 of 2008 concerning Presidential and Vice-Presidential Elections mandated each pair of candidates to be present in determining the official results of the presidential election.

== Presidential candidacies ==
=== 2014 general election ===
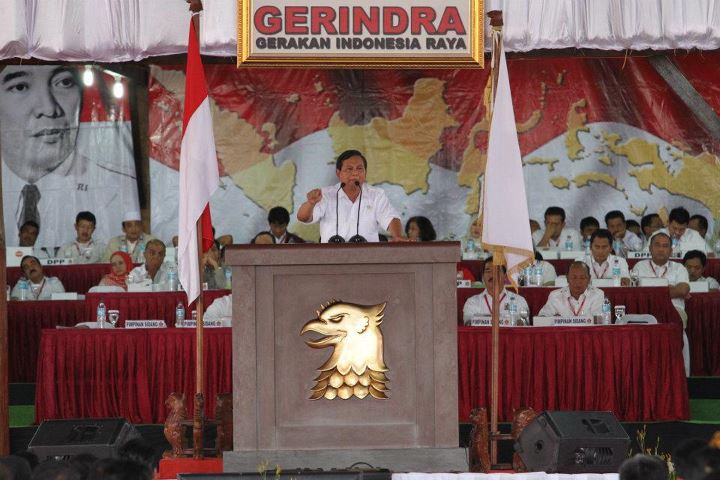
Prabowo accepting the Gerindra Party's nomination rally for the 2014 presidential election in Lembah Hambalang on 17 March 2012

In November 2011, Prabowo announced his intention to run in the 2014 presidential election. Surveys published by the Center for Policy Studies and Strategic Development (Puskaptis) and by the Indonesian Survey Institute published on 23 February 2012 gave him the lead – but observers and activists cast doubt on the polls.

In March 2012, Gerindra named Prabowo its 2014 presidential candidate. The party's slogan was then changed to Gerindra Menang Prabowo Presiden (Gerindra Wins, Prabowo Becomes President). Prabowo said he would run an investment-friendly administration if he won and that Indonesia needed more energy exploration. Furthermore, he said he had been in close contact with labour unions and believed rising worker discontent could be managed with a wise national budget. He promised to use military-style efficiency to push through chronically delayed infrastructure projects, as well as to create jobs in the archipelago's backwaters by improving agricultural productivity. Another pillar to Prabowo's platform was that he was solidly secular, and his party planned to protect the rights of minority religious groups in the Muslim-majority country.

According to numerous quick counts after the 9 April legislative election, Gerinda came in third place, positioning Prabowo as one of two leading presidential candidates for the election to be held 9 July, the other being Jakarta governor, Joko Widodo. On Tuesday, 20 May 2014, Golkar, along with the United Development Party (PPP), the National Mandate Party (PAN), the Prosperous Justice Party (PKS), and the Crescent Star Party (PBB), officially endorsed Prabowo to run for the 2014 presidential election; the coalition collected 48.9% of votes and 52.1 seats in the parliament. The day before, Prabowo had picked former Coordinating Minister for Economics Hatta Rajasa as his vice-presidential running mate.

On 22 July 2014, the day that the KPU was due to announce its official tally, Prabowo withdrew from the race after having insisted on his victory since the initial quick counts were released, although the majority showed Jokowi ahead. He attributed this withdrawal to Indonesia "failing in its duty to democracy" because of "massive cheating that is structured and systematic," and stated that he and Hatta "exercise our constitutional right to reject the presidential election and declare it unconstitutional". His speech, aired live, implied he would challenge the results in the Constitutional Court. Later reports indicated confusion over whether Prabowo had resigned from the election or simply rejected the count.

According to Douglas Ramage of the Jakarta-based Bower's Asia Group, this was the first time since Reformasi began in 1998 that the legitimacy of an election was questioned; he declared the country was entering "uncharted territory." The legality of a Prabowo challenge is questionable, as – if he withdrew – he is no longer considered a presidential candidate. If he can make the challenge, according to The Jakarta Post, the gap between the two is sufficient to make such a challenge difficult. Under the presidential election law, Prabowo could face up to six years in prison and a 100 billion rupiah (US$10 million) fine for withdrawing. Later that evening, Joko Widodo was officially announced as president and began to receive congratulations from world leaders.

Following the announcement, the value of the Indonesian rupiah dropped by 0.3%, and the JSX Composite fell by 0.9%. Observers denied Prabowo's allegations of cheating, finding that the elections were "generally fair and free;" Maswadi Rauf of the University of Indonesia stated that there was "no sign of significant fraud," and that Prabowo's withdrawal simply reflected "the real attitudes of the elite, who are not yet ready to accept losing." On 21 August 2014, the Indonesian Constitutional Court rejected his claim of fraud, confirming his election loss.

=== 2019 general election ===
On 12 April 2018, Prabowo announced he would contest the 2019 presidential election if he could obtain sufficient support from other political parties. Indonesian media had speculated on whether Prabowo would become a presidential candidate or a "king-maker" giving his support to another candidate. Prabowo's brother Hashim in March 2018 said health and logistical factors had to be considered before the party announces a presidential candidate.

In April 2018, John McBeth reported Maritime Coordinating Minister Luhut Binsar Pandjaitan had held a series of meetings with Prabowo, culminating in the proposal of a joint Jokowi-Prabowo ticket for the 2019 election. Luhut reportedly lost his enthusiasm after Prabowo allegedly said he would want to be in charge of the military and seven seats in any new cabinet. Fadli Zon denied Luhut and Prabowo had discussed politics, claiming they merely spoke about Europe's move to limit imports of Indonesian palm oil. Gerindra official Andre Rosiade also dismissed the report as a hoax.

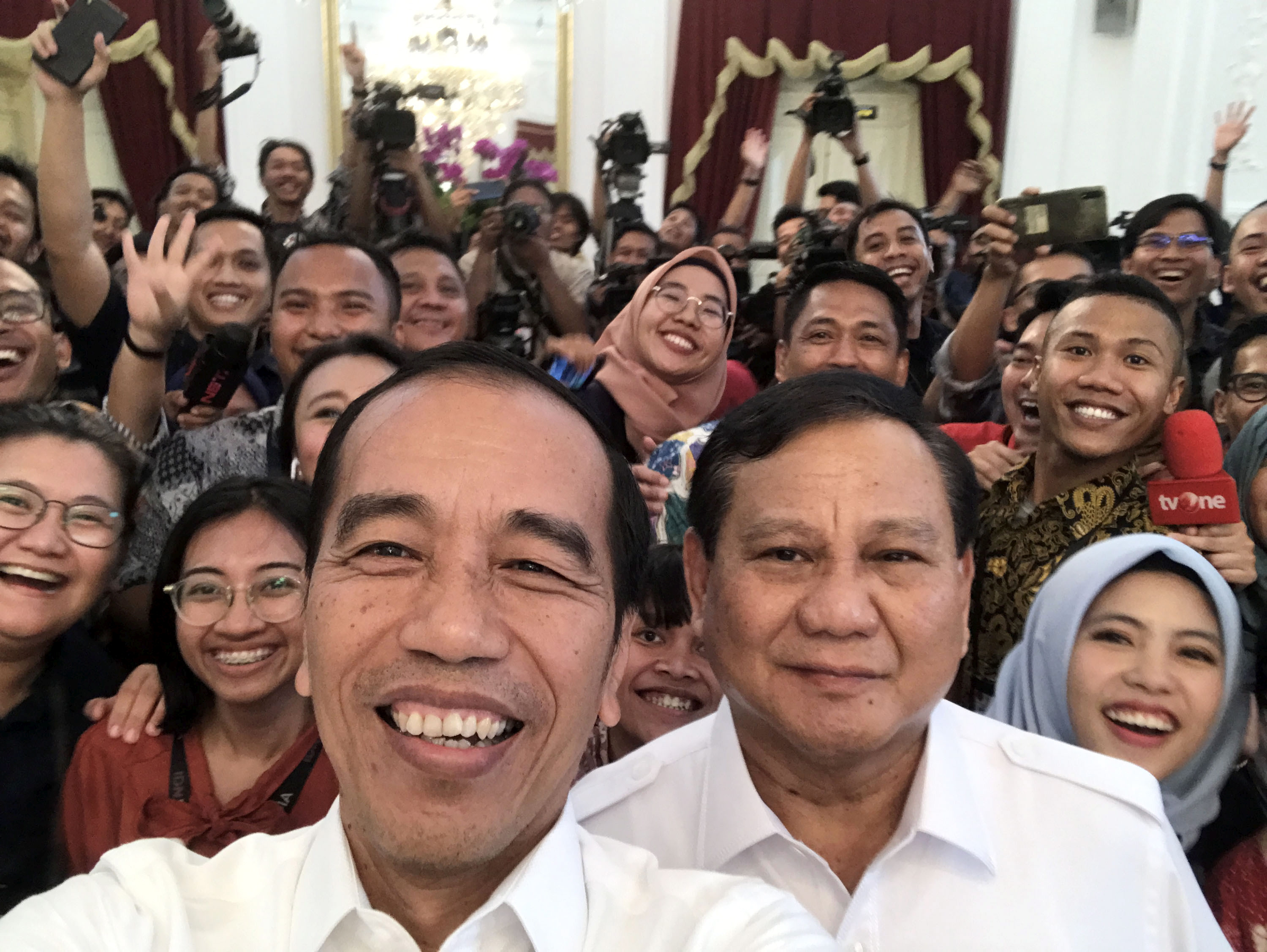
Prabowo and former Indonesian President Joko Widodo on 11 October 2019

On 10 August 2018, Prabowo registered at the KPU office for the 2019 presidential election with Sandiaga Uno as his running mate and with the support of Gerindra, PKS, PAN, the Democratic Party and Berkarya Party. The Democratic Party had wanted Prabowo to choose Agus Harimurti Yudhoyono as his running mate. Following the election, 'quick counts' conducted at polling stations by independent institutions authorised by the government indicated Jokowi had won by a margin of about 10%, but Prabowo claimed victory, insisting a real count by his side showed he received 62% of the vote. His unsubstantiated claims of widespread cheating prompted his supporters to stage protests in Jakarta, resulting in riots that left eight people dead and 737 injured. The Constitutional Court in June 2019 unanimously rejected Prabowo's appeal against the election result.

On 14 July 2019, Prabowo finally conceded to Jokowi in a train ride at Jakarta MRT, congratulated Jokowi and apologised for criticising him during the campaign trail much to the criticism of his upset supporters who expressed that Prabowo should remain as part of the opposition. His own party Gerindra eventually joined Jokowi's Onward Indonesia Coalition on 21 October 2019 with Prabowo himself appointed Minister of Defence on 23 October 2019, therefore joining Jokowi's cabinet.

=== 2024 general election ===
On 7 January 2023, Prabowo launched his third presidential campaign for the 2024 presidential election. He is running as president, together with Gibran Rakabuming Raka (the eldest son of Joko Widodo, the former President of Indonesia), as his vice-presidential candidate. Both he and Gibran registered at the KPU office on 25 October 2023 with the support of Gerindra, Golkar, PAN, PBB, the Democratic Party, Gelora Party, Indonesian Solidarity Party (PSI) and Garuda Party. Both he and Gibran's candidacies were challenged in the Constitutional Court due to age requirements. In Prabowo's case, a lawsuit was filed against him due to his old age (Prabowo was 71 at the time of announcing his candidacy) and having announced his candidacy for the third time. The Supreme Court ruled to reject the lawsuit.

In November 2023, Prabowo called for "rebalancing" where, in the past decades, Indonesia looked to the West; now they should learn from the East like China, India, Japan and South Korea. Prabowo entertained the idea of Indonesia joining BRICS if it is advantageous for Indonesia's economy, citing BRICS' nature as an economic bloc, not a geopolitical one.

On 14 February 2024, in an unofficial report, Prabowo succeeded in leading three voting lines by getting 58% of the vote. Prabowo went on to win the quick count conducted by all surveys and called for unity as he pledged to be president for all Indonesians and will form a government that will be led by "the best sons and daughters of Indonesia." Despite this, he also told his supporters to calmly but cautiously wait for the official results from KPU.

On 20 March 2024, the General Elections Commission (KPU) announced Prabowo's victory, having received over 96 million votes. Prabowo and his vice-presidential candidate, Gibran Rakabuming, they were sworn in on 20 October 2024.

On 22 April 2024, the Constitutional Court rejected all legal challenges against the results of the presidential election, allowing the KPU to declare the Prabowo-Gibran tandem the winner.

== Minister of Defence (2019–2024) ==
=== Appointment ===
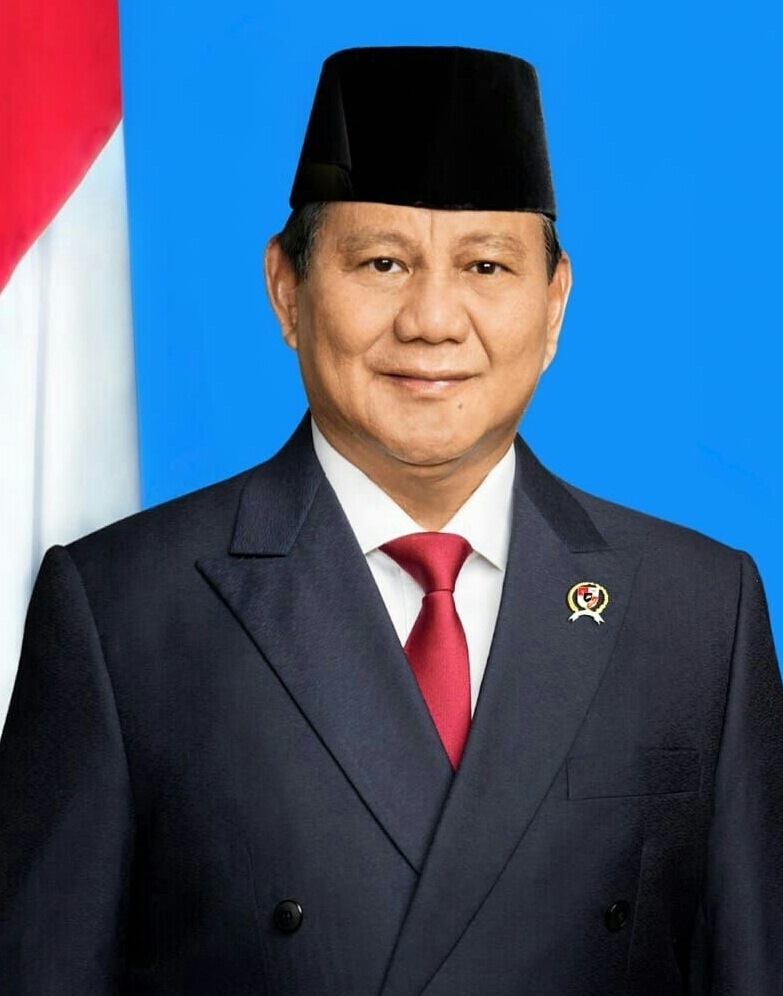
Official portrait of Prabowo as Minister of Defence, 2019

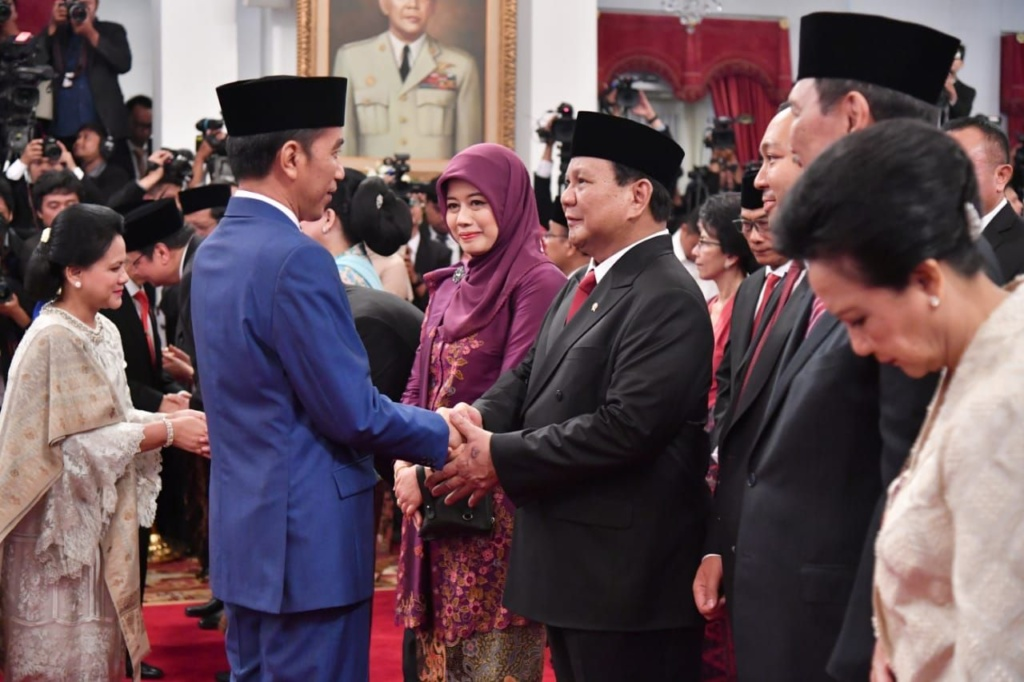
Inauguration of Prabowo as Minister of Defence, 2019

On 23 October 2019, Prabowo was inaugurated as Indonesia's Minister of Defence by president Joko Widodo. He was aided by Sakti Wahyu Trenggono as Deputy Minister of Defence. According to Jokowi, Prabowo got the job because "Indeed, he has a lot of experience there." Jokowi clarified his decision to appoint Prabowo was to build "democracy based on mutual cooperation" and said it is for the good of the country, while Prabowo said he express his desire to serve and his decision to accept the appointment is to preserve national unity.

=== Military ===
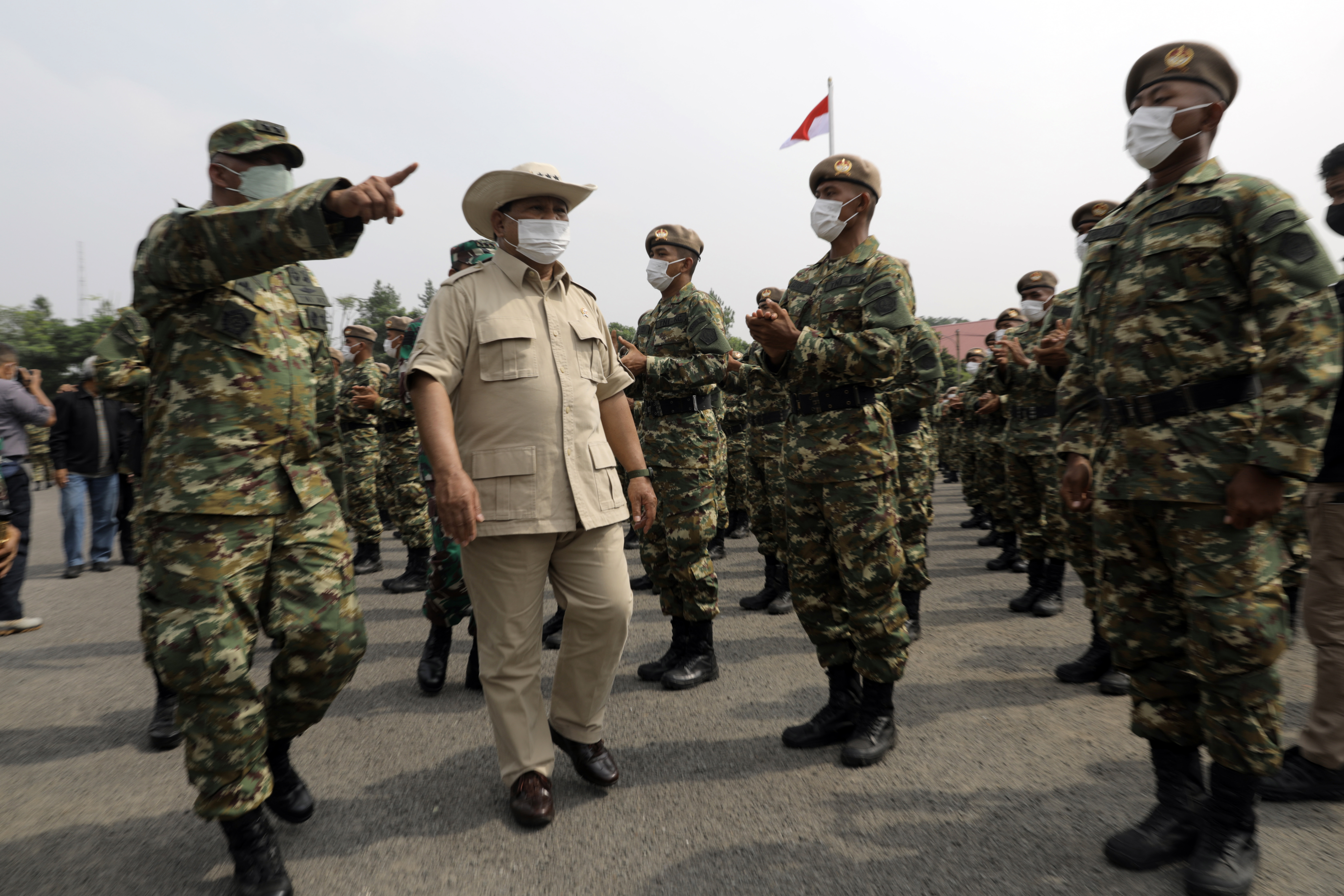
Prabowo inspecting Indonesian Reserve soldiers in October 2021

Shortly after his inauguration, Prabowo began advocating for a "total people's war" doctrine for Indonesia's national defence. In realisation to this, he formed the Reserve Component on 7 October 2021 and appointed TV presenter Deddy Corbuzier as the reserve component ambassador to boost recruitment.

Considering that some of the TNI's equipment is old, Prabowo has made efforts to continue modernising military capabilities. He believes that long-term planning, based on the assumption that the defence budget is fixed at 0.8% of Indonesia's GDP, will enable Indonesia to purchase the most advanced weapons and build a domestic defence industry. The plan, which emerged to the public not long after the sinking of the KRI Nanggala submarine, became a hot debate because the proposed figure reached Rp 1,700 trillion (Rp 1.7 quadrillion) or Rp 68 trillion per year.

Prabowo utilised the certainty of the defence budget to acquire advanced weaponry that the TNI had never possessed. He plans to significantly expand Indonesia's domestic capacity to manufacture ammunition, as the country's current production capability is only 450 million rounds per year, despite an annual demand of one billion rounds. For the Indonesian Air Force, Prabowo is looking to strengthen Indonesia's military by acquiring newer fighter aircraft such as General Dynamics F-16 Fighting Falcons and Dassault Rafales from the US and France while in the same time buying new transport aircraft such as Airbus A400M Atlas and newer Lockheed Martin C-130J Super Hercules. For the Indonesian Navy, Prabowo signed contracts for newer surface combatants such as Arrowhead 140 and FREMM while exploring possible local production on the Scorpene class submarines under PAL Indonesia. He also ordered 500 Pindad Maung light utility vehicles in 2020.

He also led renegotiation attempts regarding on the payment of the KAI KF-21 Boramae fighter program after his predecessor, Ryamizard Ryacudu stalled the payment of Indonesia's shares in the program. He later attended the launch of the aircraft prototype together with South Korean President Moon Jae-in representing Indonesia.

On 20 April 2022, together with Minister of State Owned Enterprise Erick Thohir, Prabowo strengthened the Indonesian defence industry by consolidating PT Len, Pindad, PAL Indonesia, Indonesian Aerospace and PT Dahana into a single holding, Defend ID.

=== Food estate program ===
In 2020, Prabowo was appointed by Jokowi to spearhead the national food estate program. Jokowi's reasoning for Prabowo's appointment was that as Minister of Defence, Prabowo also plays important role on carrying out strategic projects such as food storage. The development of food barns in Central Kalimantan began in mid-2020, utilising existing rice fields covering an area of around 30,000 hectares, with 10,000 hectares located in Pulang Pisau Regency and 20,000 hectares in Kapuas Regency. In 2021, this project will be expanded to 44,135 hectares. Although Prabowo was selected as the project leader, he emphasise that the Ministry of Defence will only play a supporting role in the food estate work as the Minister of Agriculture will play the leading role, indicating that cross-sector collaboration is the key to the success of this project. This reflects the synergy between the agricultural and defence sectors in an effort to achieve sustainability and national food security.

=== Defence Cooperation ===
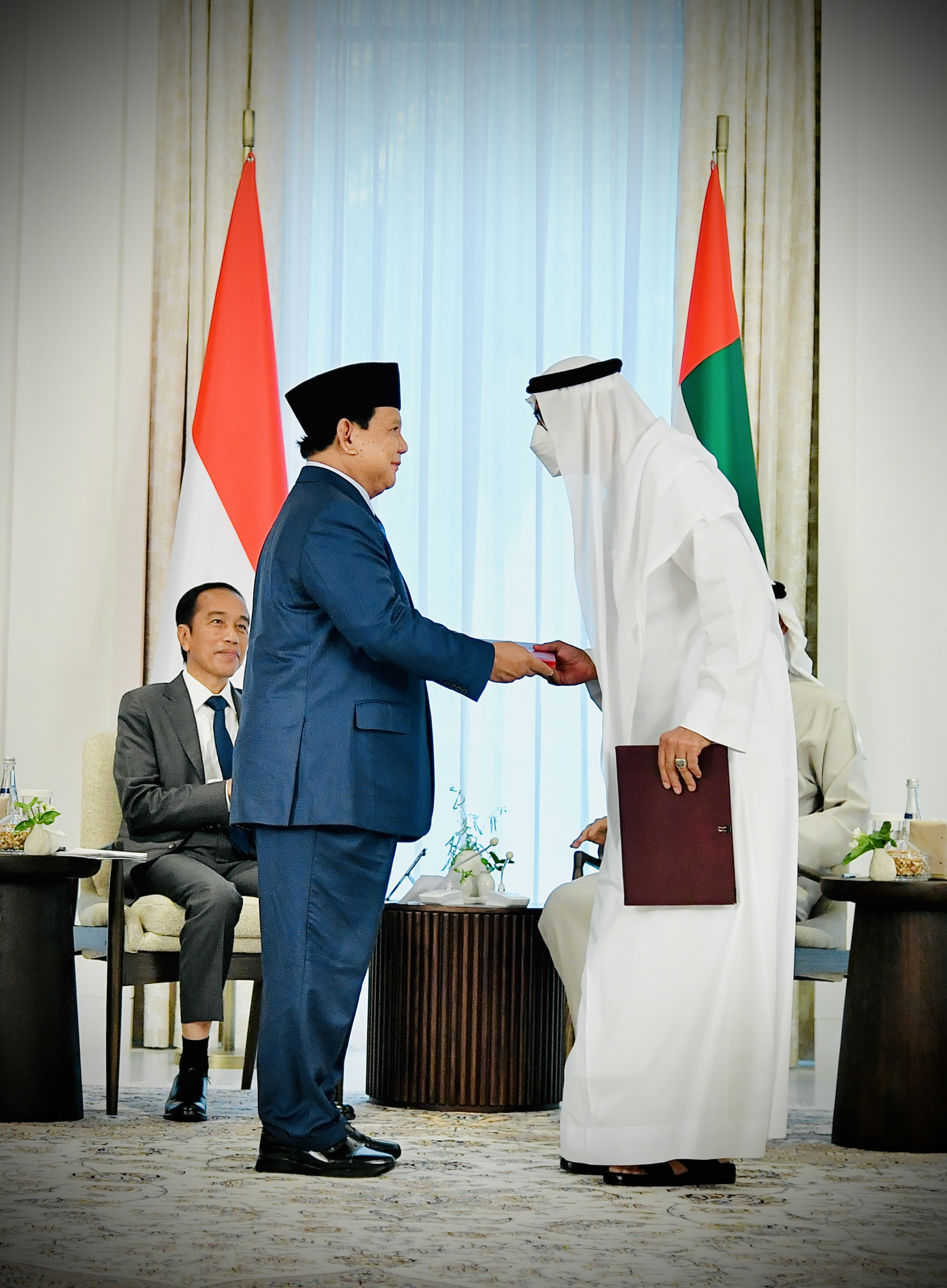
Prabowo meeting with UAE defence minister Mohammed bin Rashid Al Maktoum in July 2022

In his first 100 days as Minister of Defence, Prabowo visited 8 countries to meet the Ministers of Defence of Malaysia, Thailand, Turkey, China, Japan, the Philippines, and France to strengthen military relations.

Prabowo also made efforts to help state owned defence enterprises to export their products overseas. He succeeded in helping Indonesian Aerospace export CN-235 aircraft to Senegal and export NC-212i aircraft to Thailand, as well as helping PAL Indonesia export landing platform dock-type warships to the Philippine Navy.

In August 2024, Prabowo and Australian Prime Minister Anthony Albanese announced a new defence cooperation agreement to strengthen Australia–Indonesia security ties.

==== South China Sea ====
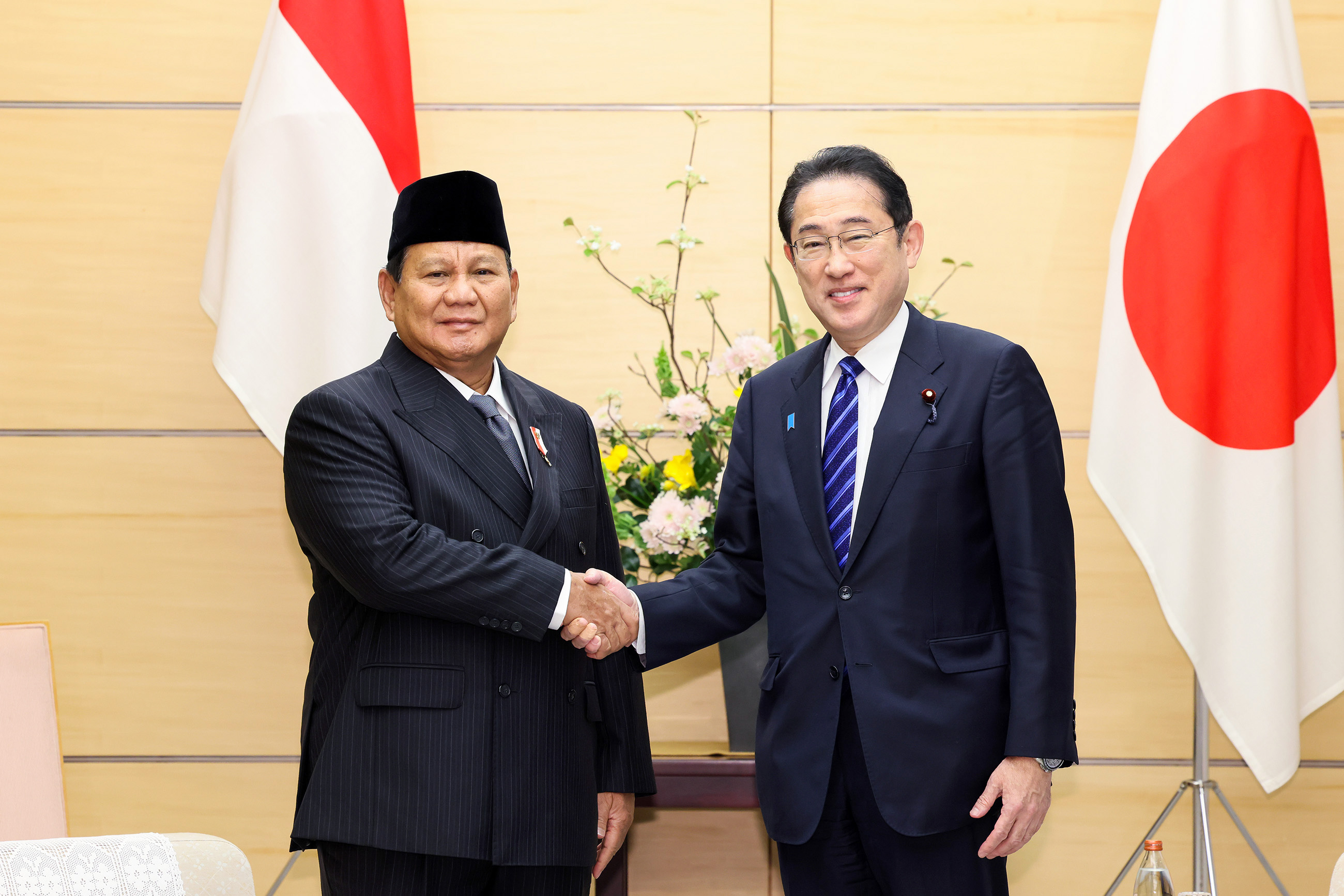
Prabowo with Japanese prime minister Fumio Kishida in April 2024

Following an incident in late 2019 where Chinese vessels violated the Indonesian EEZ off the Natuna Islands, Prabowo called for a cautious response, referring to China as a "friendly nation". He also ordered the deployment of additional navy vessels in the region in response to the incident. Despite the controversy of his inaction in Natuna Island in contrast to his fiery speeches about foreign powers during the 2019 elections, a poll by Indo Barometer on early January shows that Prabowo is the most popular minister in Jokowi's cabinet.

When asked about the situation on the South China Sea in a session at IISS Shangri-La Dialogue on 14 June 2022, Prabowo answered that Indonesia respects the interest of all countries that are involved in the region. He then quoted Nelson Mandela that "your enemies must not be our enemies too". In reaction to the formation of AUKUS and Australian plans to acquire nuclear submarines, Prabowo thinks that the alliance is made on basis of defence and it was beneath the sovereign rights of Australia, UK, and USA.

US Department of Defence said both Secretary Lloyd Austin and Minister Prabowo viewed China's aggression in the South China Sea as inconsistent to international law. This statement was then refuted by Spokesperson of the Foreign Ministry Wang Wenbin as a lie, claiming Prabowo never said that when Chinese embassy contacted the press office of the Ministry of Defence. Prabowo himself later refuted the US statement, stating there was no joint statement nor a press conference regarding to this matter and states that Indonesia is in good terms with China, US, and Russia and respects their interests, insisting Indonesia's non-aligned stances.

During the 3rd presidential debate of the 2024 elections, Prabowo argued that the situation in the region underlines the needs of a strong military. He states that the military needs more patrol platform and satellites to defend the nation from outside threats.

==== United States ====
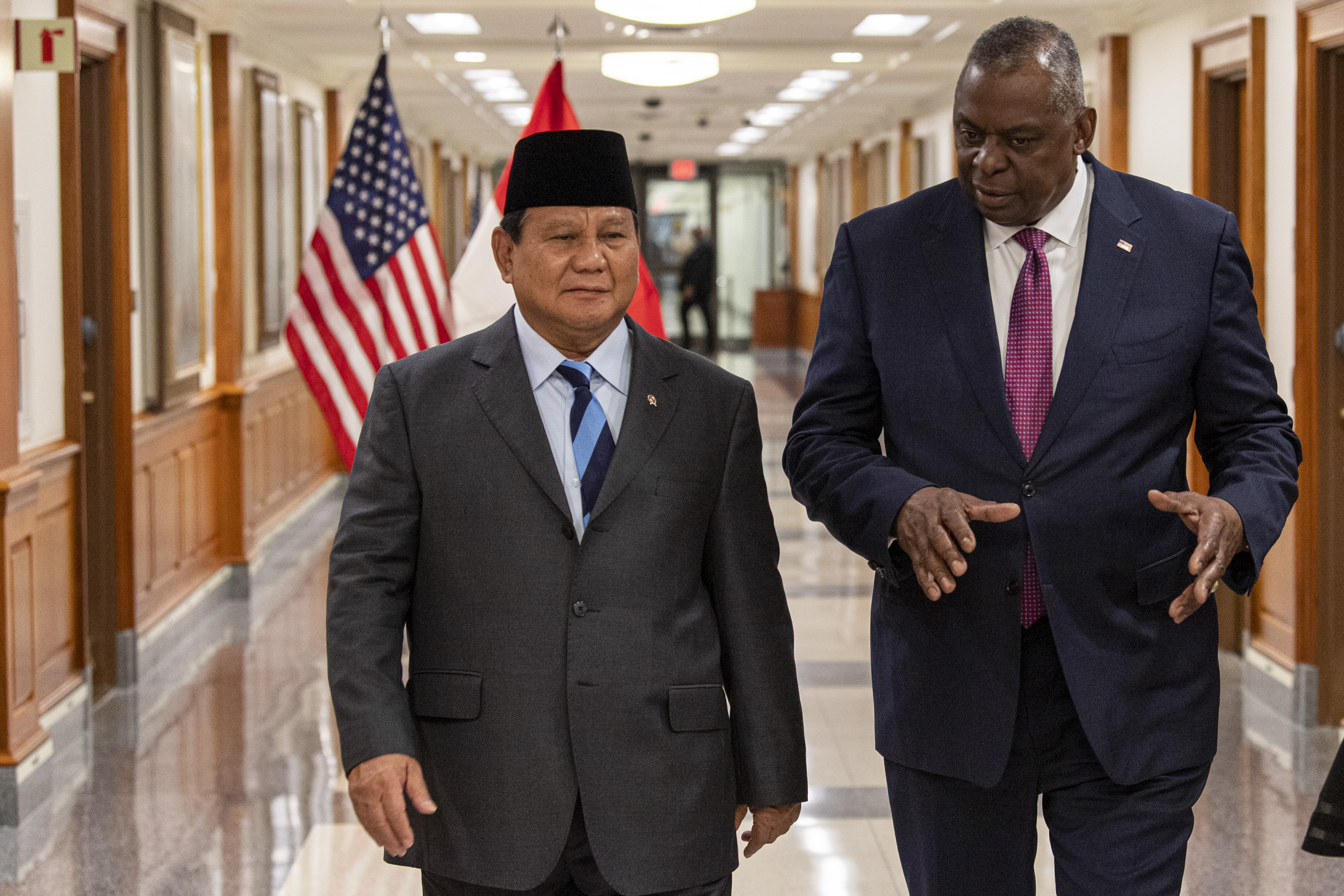
Prabowo with US secretary of defence Lloyd Austin in August 2023

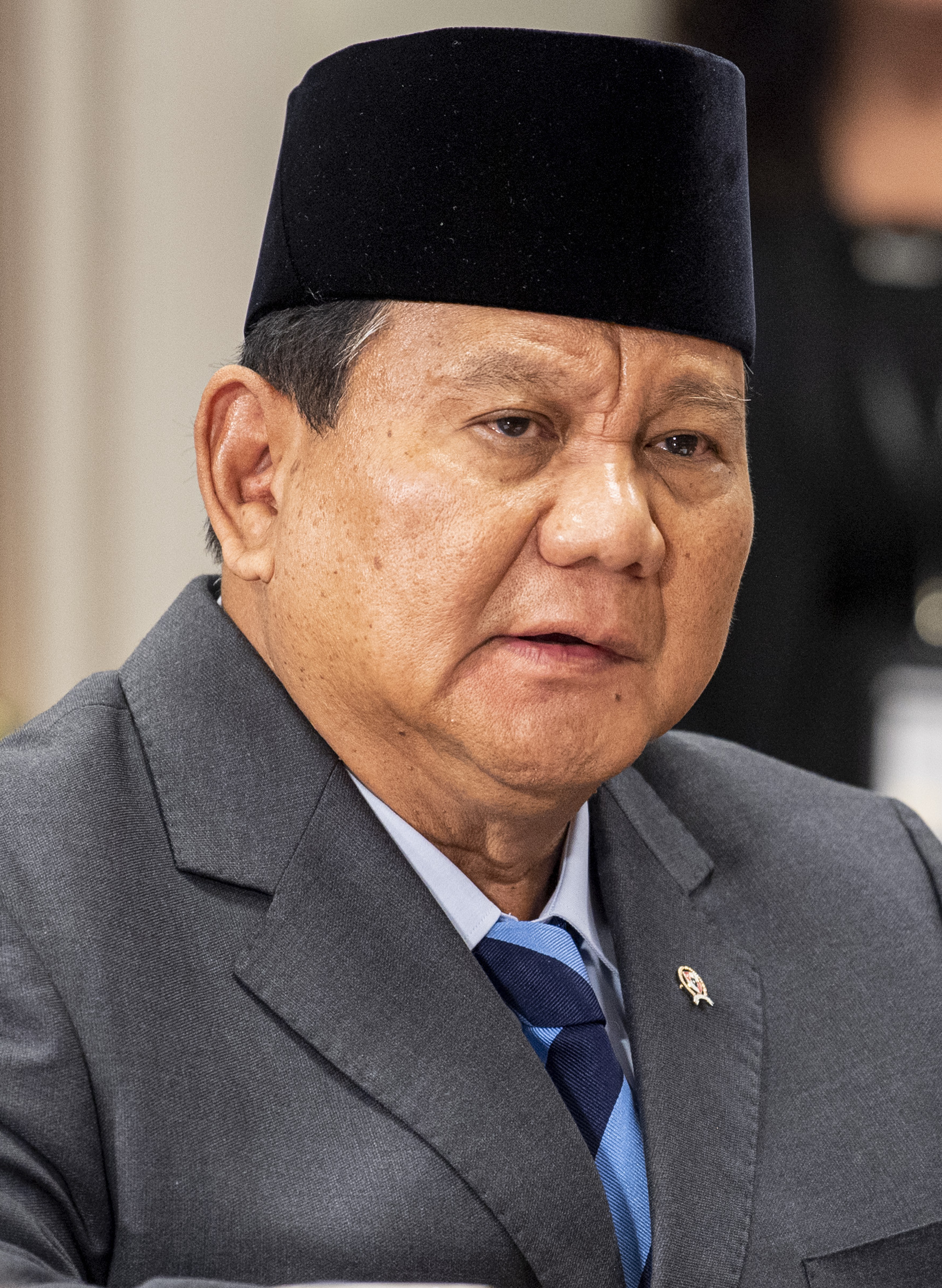
Prabowo during a bilateral exchange at The Pentagon on 24 August 2023

In October 2020, Prabowo visited the United States despite his previous ban from entering the country, in his capacity as Minister of Defence after being invited by his US counterpart Mark Esper and a visa was issued for him. Several human rights organisations, including Amnesty International, had previously called for the Trump administration to cancel the visit. From his frequent foreign visit overtures such as in the United States, Prabowo succeeded in convincing the United States Congress to approve the sale of the advanced F-15EX Eagle II supersonic fighter aircraft to Indonesia.

==== Russo-Ukrainian War ====
On 3 June 2023, Prabowo proposed a multi-point peace plan to end the ongoing Russian invasion of Ukraine at IISS Shangri-La Dialogue in Singapore. His proposal includes the following.

1. Immediate cessation of hostilities through cease-fire
2. Establishment of demilitarised zones by withdrawing 15 kilometres from their forward positions
3. UN referendums on disputed territories

Prabowo's proposal was dismissed outright by Ukrainian defence minister Oleksii Reznikov, stating that the proposal was "a Russian plan, not an Indonesian plan". This proposal was also criticised by EU foreign policy chief Josep Borrell, saying that there must be a "just peace" not "peace of surrender". It was also criticised by PDI-P as Secretary General Hasto Kristiyanto said Indonesia does not need a leader who gives advice that deviates from the principle of "free and active" diplomacy. However, his plan was well received by China, with former Chinese ambassador to the United States Cui Tiankai expressing appreciation for Prabowo's efforts while criticising the West for mismanaging their own security situation. Prabowo was later called by Jokowi for clarifications on the peace plan as Indonesia had officially condemned Russia for the invasion. Jokowi then clarified that Prabowo's peace plan as "okay" because it was just a suggestion in an open dialogue and did not officially reflect Indonesia's stance.

On 2 June 2024, Ukrainian President Volodymyr Zelenskyy met Prabowo on the sidelines of IISS Shangri-La Dialogue in Singapore and invited him to attend the June 2024 Ukraine peace summit at Geneva, hoping for his attendance. In response to this invitation, Prabowo said he could not confirm his presence to the June summit and he had to discuss with President Jokowi, Minister of Foreign Affairs Retno Marsudi and Coordinating Minister for Political, Legal, and Security Affairs Hadi Tjahjanto on Indonesia's official stance in attending the summit. Prabowo told Zelenskyy that "Many countries feel that in a peace summit all elements must be present, especially Russia". Prabowo offered Indonesia's solution to Zelenskyy which he seemed not to accept Indonesia's proposal on ceasefire and Prabowo is keen to continue finding a solution. Prabowo also offered Zelenskyy Indonesia's good service in any avenues to find solutions for peace between Russia and Ukraine.

In July 2024, Prabowo held talks in Moscow with Russian President Vladimir Putin and Defence Minister Andrey Belousov. Belousov called Indonesia one of Russia's key partners in the Asia-Pacific region.

==== Gaza-Israel conflict ====
During the Israel-Gaza conflict in 2023, Prabowo called out his disappointment with the Western countries who seemed silent when they saw civilians and children becoming victims of war and blasted the west for a perceived double standards on human rights. He has donated Rp. 5 billion of his personal wealth to the Palestinian people and joined President Jokowi, Secretary of State Pratikno, Minister of Foreign Affairs Retno Marsudi and Ambassador to Indonesia from Palestine Zuhair Al-Shun in sending off 51.5 tonnes of aid delivered by the Indonesian Air Force. He had also communicated with the Egyptian defence minister Mohamed Ahmad Zaki to allow the passage of the Indonesian Navy hospital ship KRI dr. Radjiman Wedyodiningrat to dock near El Arish, Sinai in order to deliver further aid for Palestine.

In an article he wrote for The Economist which was published on 26 April 2024, Prabowo called out the West for being double standards when it comes to the conflict. In this op-ed, Prabowo stated his views that "as a human being, you don't have to be a Muslim to feel the suffering in Gaza and you don't have to be a Muslim to be angry at what has happened". Prabowo deplored Western condemnation on Russia's invasion of Ukraine and launched global campaigns condemning Russia while being silent on Israeli invasion of the Gaza Strip, writing critical questions such as "How is killing Palestinian civilians less worthy of denunciation than the killing of Ukrainian civilians?" while calling Western stances as "a moral crisis". He expressed his sympathies for the Israeli victims of the October 7 attacks but called out against the retaliatory actions conducted by Israel.

Subianto and Hungarian Prime Minister Viktor Orbán signing the Board of Peace Charter in Davos, Switzerland, 22 January 2026

During the IISS Shangri-La Dialogue in Singapore on 2 June 2024, Prabowo stated Indonesia's readiness to send troops to Gaza under an UN peacekeeping mission if needed and he also stated Indonesia's readiness to evacuate and treat up to a thousand wounded Palestinians in Indonesian hospitals as soon as possible if situation in the ground permits. His statement is further backed by Commander of the Indonesian National Armed Forces Agus Subiyanto, stating the TNI can deploy 1394 personnels for peacekeeping missions in Gaza and has approached Singapore and Australia who express their interest in joining Indonesia for a joint operation. President Jokowi expressed his support for Prabowo's plan to provide medical aid and instructed him to seek cooperation with the United Arab Emirates on operating a hospital in Gaza and flew to Jordan to attend a summit regarding to Gaza on Jokowi's behalf. Prabowo's idea also gained support from Prime Minister Anwar Ibrahim, who proposed a joint mission between Indonesia and Malaysia.

=== Education ===
One of Prabowo's first actions as Minister of Defence was to expand the field of study at the Indonesian Defence University. In Prabowo's directive, campus opened the Bachelor of Military Medicine and Bachelor of Science and Mathematics and Military Science study programs. He also waived tuition fees for distinguished cadets and ensure the welfare of students by providing laptop computers from campus. On 25 March 2022, Jokowi and Prabowo expanded the campus by opening a branch outside Sentul, West Java, namely Ben Mboi Polytechnic, in Belu, East Nusa Tenggara.

Prabowo also personally received 22 Palestinian students to be enrolled at campus on 8 November 2023 with a 5-year term study in medicine, pharmacy, and engineering. He gave them full scholarship and promised to enrol more Palestinian students into the university. According to Prabowo, their enrolment is a part of Indonesia's own commitment to aid Palestine in their efforts to be a recognised sovereign country.

== Presidency (2024–present) ==
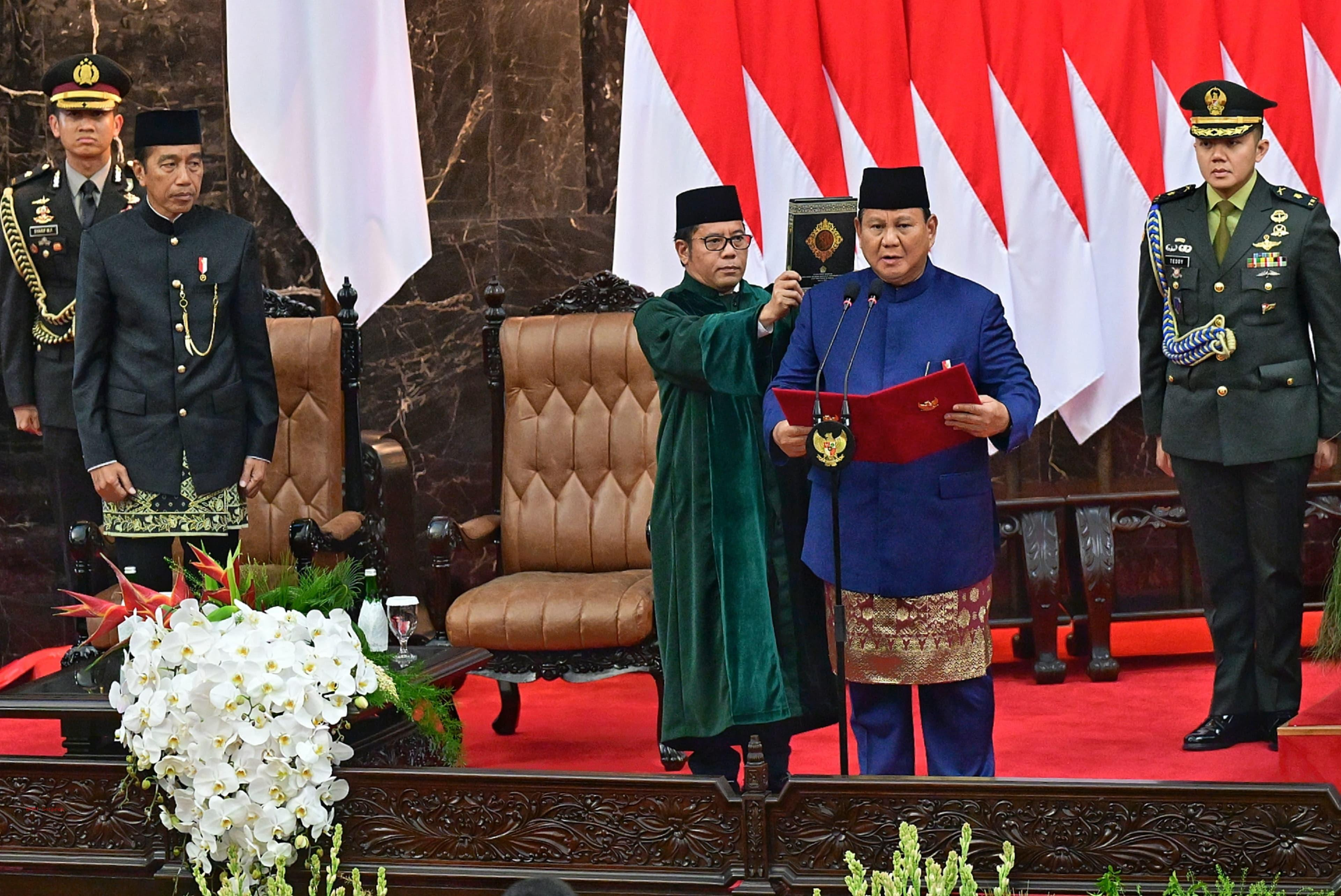
President Prabowo taking his presidential oath in 2024

The Prabowo–Gibran ticket won the 2024 presidential election with 58.59% of the vote against two of their opponents, Anies–Muhaimin and Ganjar–Mahfud. On 20 October 2024, Prabowo assumed the presidency of Indonesia. At 73 years, three days of age on inauguration day, Prabowo is the oldest person to assume Indonesian presidency, while his counterpart, Gibran, is the youngest person to assume the Indonesian vice presidency at 37 years, 19 days of age.

=== Cabinet ===
On 21 October, Prabowo unveiled the largest ministerial cabinet in Indonesia since the Revised Dwikora Cabinet of President Sukarno in 1966, composed of 103 members including 48 ministers and 55 deputy ministers. Some ministers from the previous Onward Indonesia Cabinet such as Airlangga Hartarto, Sri Mulyani and Bahlil Lahadalia were retained as ministers in this cabinet. On 25 October, he held a military-style retreat for his cabinet at the Indonesian Military Academy in Magelang.

Prabowo has conducted three cabinet reshuffles. On 19 February 2025, Minister of Higher Education, Science, and Technology Satryo Brodjonegoro resigned and was replaced by Brian Yuliarto. Satryo Brodjonegoro resigned because he believed his performance during his four months in office had not met the Prabowo administration's expectations. Following August 2025 protests, Prabowo replaced five ministers on 8 September, including finance minister Sri Mulyani Indrawati and security minister Budi Gunawan. The Ministry of Hajj and Umrah was established as a separate ministry, assuming responsibility for the administration and management of Indonesia's Hajj pilgrimage. On 17 September, the president implemented cabinet reshuffle for the Coordinating Minister for Political and Security Affairs and the Minister of Youth and Sports, replaced the Chief of Presidential Staff, the Head of Presidential Communication Office, the Deputy Heads of National Nutrition Agency, and three deputy ministers. The president also appointed the Police Commissioner General (Ret.) Ahmad Dofiri as the Special Advisor of the President for Security and Public Order and Police Reform.

=== Economy ===
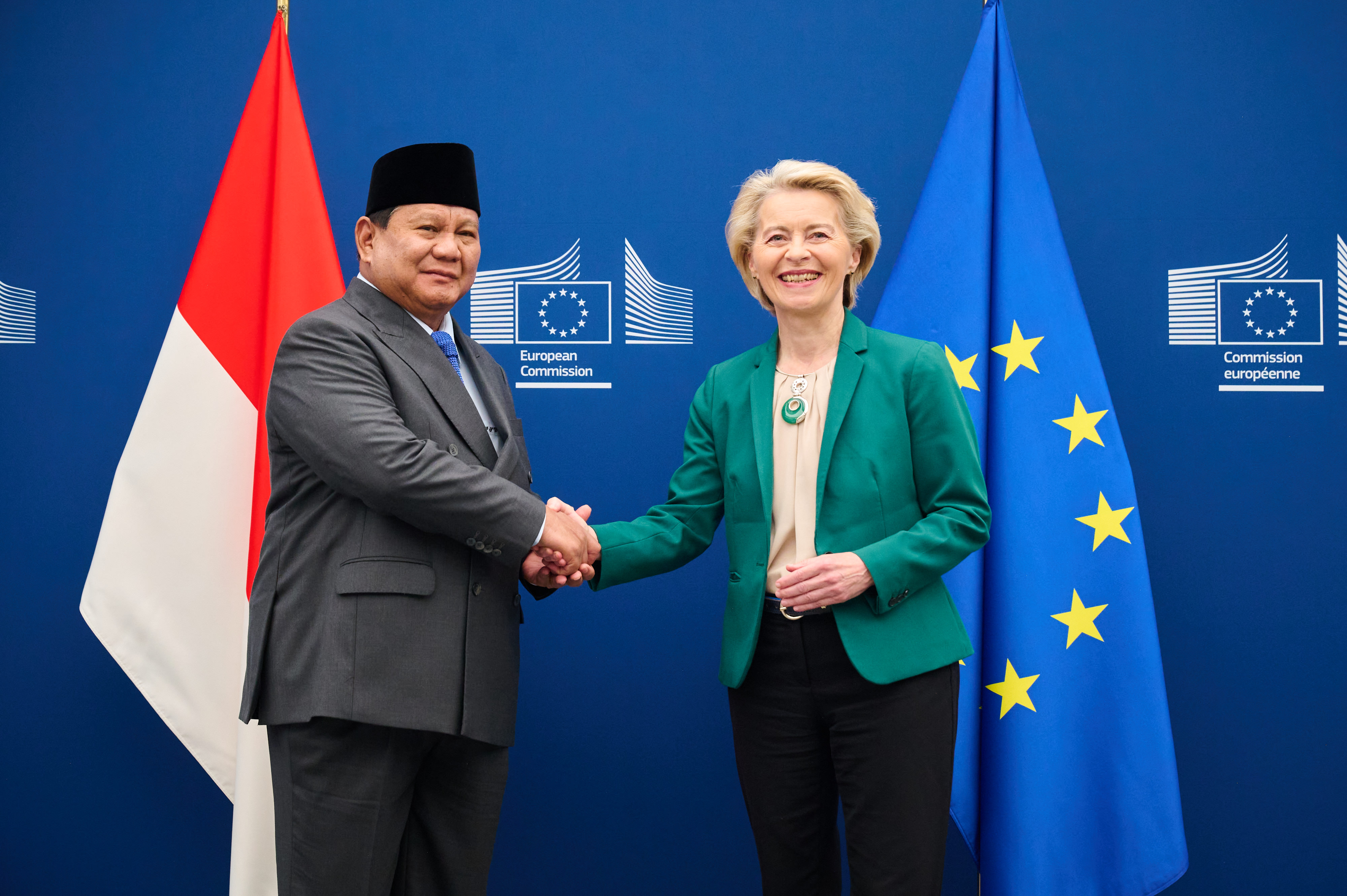
Prabowo with EU Commission President Ursula von der Leyen at the Berlaymont building, 13 July 2025

Prabowo's economic policy claim to emulate his father's, Sumitro Djojohadikusumo, who had a socialist economic outlook. This was further confirmed by his younger brother, Hashim that Prabowo's term as president will be the "right momentum" to apply his father's theories into practice and the proposed policies that will be enacted by Prabowo were the dreams hoped by their father that is soon to be realised. Among his father's economic policies, Prabowo is once seen to revive his father's Program Benteng policy, which was enacted during Mohammad Natsir's government that empowers indigenous business owners. His economic policies also draw inspiration from his father-in-law, Suharto, with Coordinating Minister for Economic Affairs Airlangga Hartarto remarking that Suharto's economic policies on investments, spending and exports may be again enacted but unlike Suharto, Prabowo will be eyeing more towards digital economy, downstreaming and semiconductors.

Prabowo officially launched Indonesia's first-ever bullion bank service on 26 February 2025. For years, gold mined in Indonesia has often flowed overseas without proper domestic storage. With the launch of the bullion bank, Prabowo hopes to provide a more structured system for the storage, management, and trade of gold within the country.

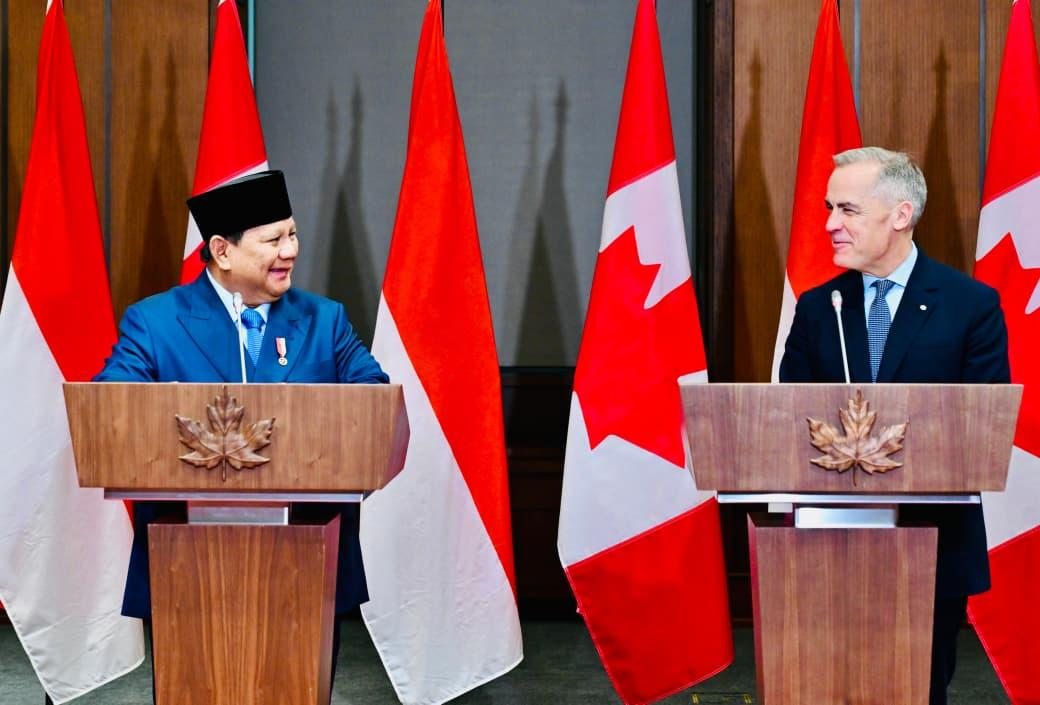
Subianto and Canadian Prime Minister Mark Carney in Parliament Hill, Ottawa, 24 September 2025

In September 2025, Subianto and Canadian Prime Minister Mark Carney signed in Ottawa the first bilateral free trade agreement between Canada and an ASEAN member state.

Prabowo's economic policy declares a return to a national-capitalist model grounded in the belief that the liberal free-market era has failed to deliver equitable development. At the 2025 St. Petersburg International Economic Forum he asserted that "for the past 30 years, we have seen neoliberal and free-market thinking dominate … and yet many Indonesians have not enjoyed equal opportunity." Accordingly his administration pursues four strategic priorities such as food self-sufficiency, energy self-sufficiency, education quality improvement, and accelerated industrialisation, and mandates that natural-resource wealth must first benefit the people. In pursuit of those ends his government has launched large-scale populist spending programmes (such as the free nutritious meals scheme and rice-aid and electricity-discount policies) while simultaneously ordering a budget-efficiency sweep: a January 2025 presidential instruction cut Rp 306.6 trillion of spending to redirect funds into social programmes. To complement this, his government has shifted the revenue-mobilisation paradigm: the 2026 draft budget sets a growth target of 5.4% (with a long-term aspiration of 8%) and projects a deficit cap of ~2.5% of GDP, emphasising better tax-to-GDP ratio rather than raw debt expansion.

Prabowo Subianto's decision to appoint Purbaya Yudhi Sadewa as Minister of Finance on 8 September 2025 signalled a change in economic policymaking, a departure from the fiscal-orthodoxy of his predecessor Sri Mulyani Indrawati. Whereas under Sri Mulyani the dominant paradigm emphasised stringent deficit-control, broad-based tax reform and market-friendly discipline, Purbaya has publicly advocated for a "liquidity-first" posture and a strong pro-growth thrust. In his first week, Purbaya redirected roughly Rp 200 trillion from idle government funds at the central bank into commercial banks as a measure to invigorate lending and consumption. He also stressed greater emphasis on domestic investment, real-sector productivity and boosting household purchasing power, within the broader political vision of Prabowo's "national-capitalist" economic doctrine. He also stated that "there will be no major tax-rate increases" until Indonesia's economy grows at least 6%.

==== Prabowonomics ====
Emulating Jokowi, Prabowo and his government popularized the term Prabowonomics which outlines the work program prepared by Prabowo during his campaign and intended for implementation during his tenure. Under Prabowo’s administration, the government harbors a major ambition to break free from the middle-income trap. Consequently, an annual growth target of 8 percent has been set, with the aim of creating jobs. To address malnutrition and stunting, the government is providing free lunches to all schoolchildren universally, regardless of economic status or geographic location. Downstreaming efforts are expanding beyond nickel commodities to include copper, bauxite, and tin, as well as the agricultural and maritime sectors. The government is also targeting self-sufficiency in food, energy, and water. Social assistance schemes are being maintained, utilizing a unified data system for more precise targeting. Through this approach, extreme poverty can be eradicated via a combination of cash assistance, improvements to habitable housing, and access to healthcare.

==== Bad debt ====
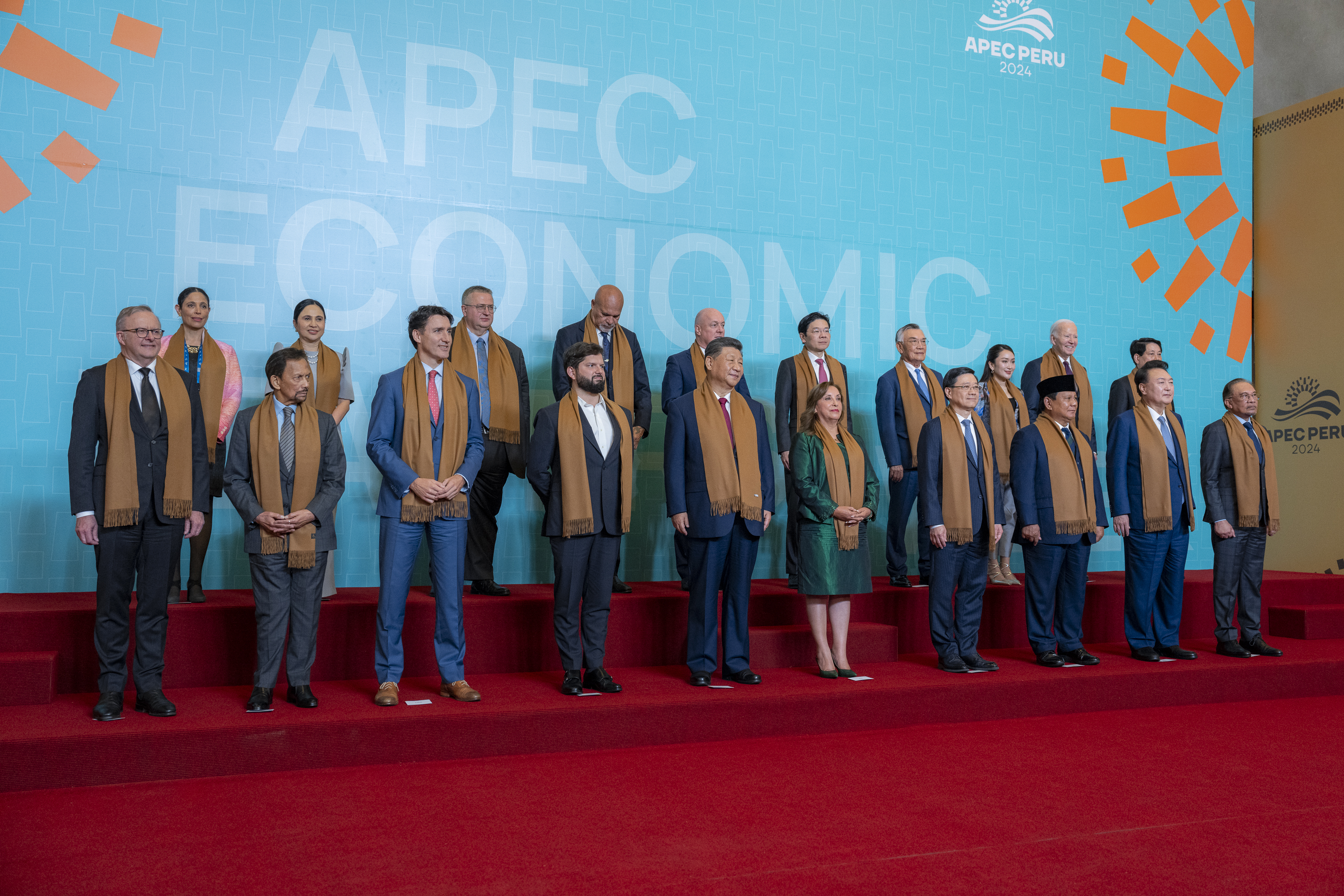
Prabowo, Joe Biden, Anthony Albanese, Justin Trudeau and other leaders at the APEC Summit in Lima, 16 November 2024

On 5 November 2024, Prabowo signed a law that wrote off bad debt for small and medium enterprises in order to increase national economic resilience through write-offs and conditional write-offs in the fields of agriculture, plantations, animal husbandry, fisheries and maritime affairs. The Write-off/Collection of Bad Debts of MSMEs is implemented as part of the 130-day work program of the Red and White Cabinet. The government stated that MSMEs are the backbone of the national economy, with a total of 66 million business units and absorbing up to 97% of the total workforce in Indonesia. However, various challenges such as the impact of the COVID-19 pandemic, natural disasters, and difficult economic conditions have caused many MSME players to experience credit congestion.

==== Value-added Tax Hike ====
His value-added tax policy drew controversy as the government planned to raise VAT from 11% to 12%. The increase plan sparked outrage and concerns from labour unions to business owners. Social media users campaigned to stop paying taxes as a form of protest against the government's policy while labour unions threatened a massive strike if the increase goes through. The Indonesian Democratic Party of Struggle also joined in protest against the proposed raise but was met with criticism from pro-government legislators for being hypocritical as PDI-P once endorsed the idea during Jokowi's presidency by passing the law that will gradually raise it to 12% back in 2021. On 31 December 2024, Prabowo and Minister of Finance Sri Mulyani announced that the raise to 12% will only be applied to luxurious goods and services such as yachts, private jets and luxurious housing while there will be no tax raise for other goods and services that is not considered as luxury.

==== Budget ====
During a cabinet meeting on 22 January 2025, Prabowo remarked that he is the first president to oversee a budget that is "up to the ninth unit" and announced that he will cut non-essential spending, from cutting budget for official trips by the ministry to banning ceremonial events that is considered as waste of budget. Doing so, Prabowo managed to cut the budget up to Rp. 306,6 trillion through Presidential Instruction Number 1 of 2025, and the slashed funds will be relocated towards policies that will benefit the people, such as the free school lunch (Indonesian: Makan Bergizi Gratis (MBG), literally: Free Nutritious Lunch) program.

In September 2025, the central government announced that fiscal transfers to regional governments would be reduced from Rp 920 trillion (USD 55.4 billion) to Rp 650 trillion (USD 39.1 billion) for the 2026 fiscal year.

==== Danantara Sovereign Wealth Fund ====
On Monday 24 February 2025, Prabowo officially launched the Daya Anagata Nusantara (Danantara) sovereign wealth fund. During the same launching speech, he also stated that the Government has proven its commitment with discipline and accountable financial governance. Danantara works by gathering state-owned enterprise assets to seek funding. These assets will then be used as collateral for debt or even sold, which is estimated to manage up to US$900 billion in assets under management. The initial funding is targeted at US$20 billion.

==== Soup Kitchens ====
Prabowo oversaw the construction of 12,000 soup kitchens. However, in 2026, the operation and construction of these kitchens were halted as a cost-cutting measure during the June and July holiday period. The public viewed the suspension as abrupt, given the substantial resources invested in the program.

=== Environment ===
Severe wildfires in 2026 caused a severe regional haze crisis, affecting Indonesia's relations with Malaysia and Singapore. Prabowo's government initiated firefighting operations, but faced criticism domestically and from its neighbours. Prabowo criticised neighbouring countries for insulting Indonesia over the haze.

=== Defence ===
During the 2024 election, Prabowo proposed several policies in regards to the defence budget, defence industry, strengthening the Reserve Component, increased TNI presence in the border, synergy within defence institutions against separatism, and increased competency in defence technology and professionalism. His policies enacted as Minister of Defence is then continued by Minister Sjafrie Sjamsoeddin. Prabowo's modernisation programs on the armed forces from his days as Minister of Defence largely continued under his presidency.

==== Defence acquisitions ====
Prabowo has stated his interest to join TAI TF Kaan project in a meeting with Turkish president Recep Tayyip Erdoğan during his state visit in Turkey. From the bilateral visit, the two countries agreed to set up joint ventures between strategic defence companies from both countries, aiming to contribute in Indonesia's development of fifth-generation fighters and submarine shipbuilding.

During the bilateral meeting with French president Emmanuel Macron, Prabowo and Macron witnessed as their respective defence ministers Sjafrie Sjamsoeddin and Sébastien Lecornu signed a letter of intent for a few military hardware, which includes additional CAESAR self-propelled howitzer, Scorpène-class submarines, light frigates and finally an additional order of 12 Dassault Rafale following up the 42 Rafales ordered when Prabowo was defence minister. The purchase of additional Rafales became noteworthy considering rumours spread that Indonesia may ditch the entire order and replace it with Chengdu J-10 of the same quantity after Pakistan Air Force has shot down one of Indian Air Force Rafales during Operation Sindhoor. Minister Lecornu in Twitter hailed the agreement as a sign of Indonesia's trust on the French defence industry.

In March 2025, it was stated that the Indonesian Navy was interested in acquiring the Giuseppe Garibaldi aircraft carrier from Italy, along with her airwing of Harrier II jets. Fincantieri presented a proposal to the Indonesian Navy in July 2025 to convert Giuseppe Garibaldi into a helicopter and UAV assault ship. On 13 February 2026, the Indonesian Ministry of Defense announced that Italy had agreed in principle to transfer the Giuseppe Garibaldi to Indonesia as a grant, making it the country's first aircraft carrier. Although the ship itself would be provided free of charge, Indonesia committed to funding its retrofit and technological modifications to meet Indonesian Navy operational requirements. Admiral Muhammad Ali stated that the vessel was expected to arrive before the anniversary of the Indonesian National Armed Forces on 5 October 2026, subject to the completion of negotiations and administrative procedures. According to the Ministry of Defense, the ship will be employed primarily for military operations other than war, particularly humanitarian assistance and disaster relief.

==== Armed Forces Act reform ====
Under Prabowo, the government has controversially made efforts to revise the Indonesian National Armed Forces Act. The revision has become controversial because some clause of the Act contains potential to revive dwifungsi (double role) and allow active Indonesian National Armed Forces service members to take on civilian roles in government. The lack of transparency, accountability, public participation and the perceived mutilation of the spirit of Reformasi has led to widespread protest. The decision to discuss such revision in Fairmont Jakarta, a 5-star hotel nearby the MPR/DPR/DPD building instead of the parliament building itself had already sparked criticisms from human rights organisation.

=== Foreign policy ===
Subianto at the group photo of BRICS heads of state at the 18th BRICS summit in New Delhi, India, 13 September 2026

Prabowo continued the foreign policy of "thousand friends and zero enemies" enacted by his predecessors Susilo Bambang Yudhoyono and Joko Widodo with a slightly more active role. In early 2025, Indonesia officially became a member of BRICS. Indonesia's membership in BRICS will strengthen Indonesia's position in the global political arena. In a press statement, the Indonesian Ministry of Foreign Affairs viewed BRICS membership as a strategic step to enhance collaboration and cooperation with other developing countries, based on the principles of equality, mutual respect, and sustainable development.

Under his administration, he attempted to widen the definition of Indonesia's "free and active" foreign policy through political and economic pragmatism as well as regional stability. He modelled his foreign policy from the words of Mohammad Hatta as "sailing between two reefs." Compared to Jokowi, Prabowo is seen as a much more aggressive, aspirational, and decisive diplomat. Former President Yudhoyono remarked that Prabowo will be a "foreign policy president." He was the first president-elect in Indonesia's history to conduct foreign visits prior to his inauguration, visiting 20 countries.

Prabowo is the president with the highest number of foreign trips in Indonesian history, visiting 35 countries and traveled abroad each month except for February and March in 2025; he was out of the country for 95 days between November 2024 to April 2026. He defended his numerous international visits, stating that they are essential for securing Indonesia's oil supply amid the 2026 Iran war and claiming that these trips have yielded positive outcomes for the country.

==== United States ====
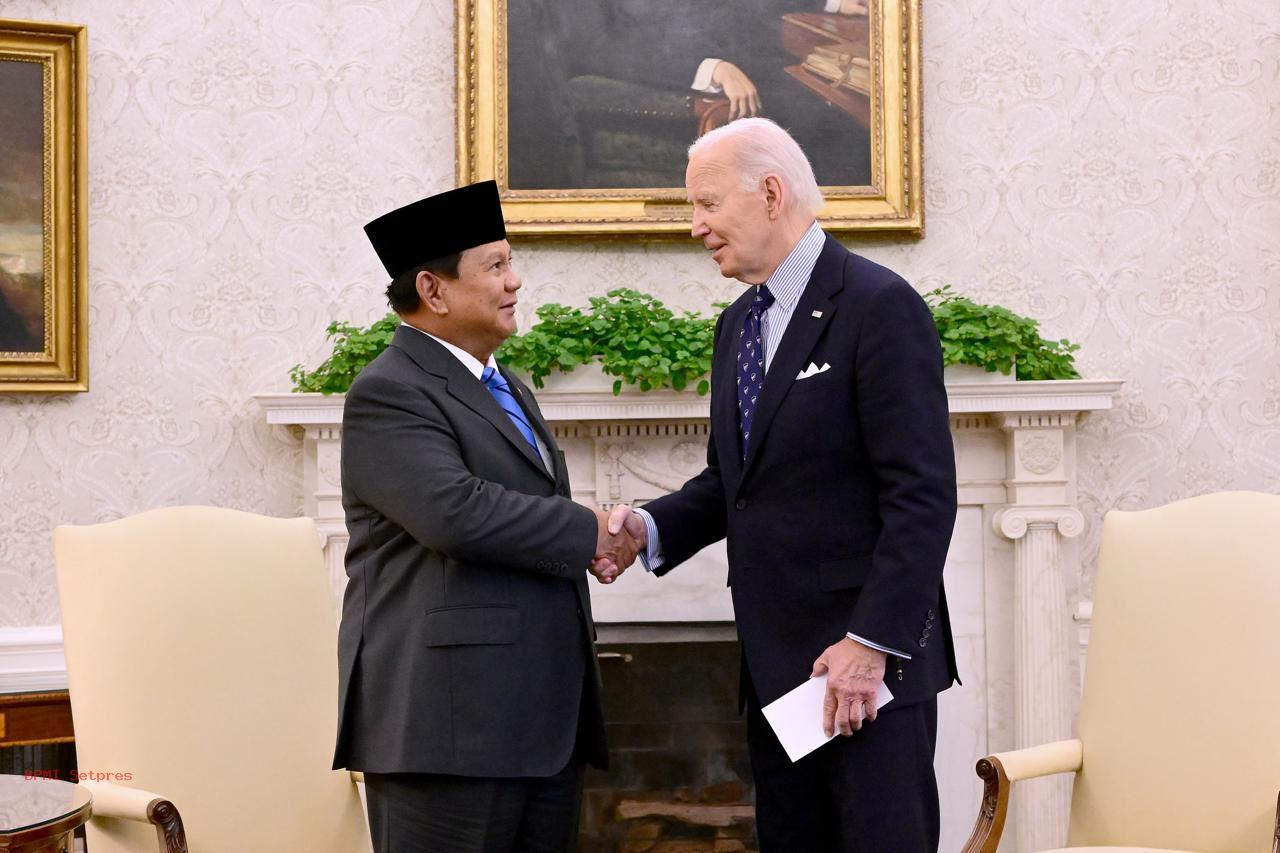
Prabowo meeting with U.S. President Joe Biden in November 2024

Several months after his inauguration, President Prabowo visited the United States in November 2024. Then, in February 2026, President Prabowo made another overseas visit to the United States to meet with President Trump. During the visit, President Prabowo had several important agendas, including attending the Board of Peace consultation meeting and trade negotiations with the US. President Prabowo sought to highlight Indonesia's multilateral and bilateral cooperation during the visit. He also met with all former Indonesian foreign ministers to discuss strategic plans for negotiations with the US. He had prepared well in advance for these negotiations. During the negotiations, the two countries agreed to renew trade cooperation between Indonesia and the US. Although several points tended to favour the US, Indonesia sought to avoid giving a blank check by requesting tariff adjustments for several of Indonesia's leading products in the US market. In the multilateral negotiations, he also succeeded in building consensus on Indonesia's role and obligations on the Board of Peace, appointing Indonesia as Deputy Commander, although some analysts predicted that the Board of Peace would only serve to legitimise US and Israeli interests in Gaza, as the Board of Peace is not an official UN peacekeeping force.

==== China ====
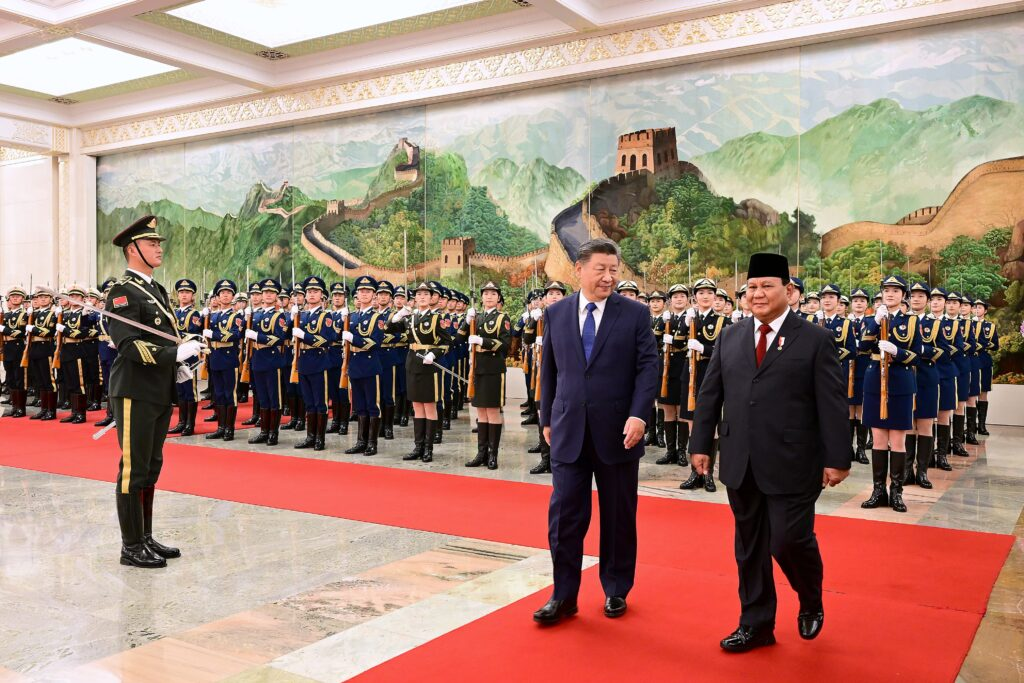
Prabowo and Chinese President Xi Jinping in Beijing, 9 November 2024

During a November 2024 presidential visit by Prabowo to China, Indonesia and China signed a memorandum of understanding for "joint maritime development" in the area of the two countries "overlapping claims" near the Natuna Islands. Indonesia's Foreign Ministry subsequently issued a statement that the memorandum did not impact Indonesia's sovereignty or rights in the area and stating that in Indonesia's view the Chinese claims do not have a legal basis. Critics of the memorandum who were quoted by the South China Morning Post contended that the wording could support China's position regarding the South China Sea claims.

==== Middle East ====
Prabowo has continued to vocally advocating for Palestinian independence. In his diplomatic visit to the United States, he proposed the two-state solution to US President Joe Biden to end the Gaza conflict. He also once again voiced his support in the D-8 summit held in Cairo while expressing his disappointment in front of other Muslim leaders on the lack of unity, citing Libya, Yemen, and Sudan. His disappointment gained support from Malaysian Prime Minister Anwar Ibrahim, calling his disappointment "a bitter truth."

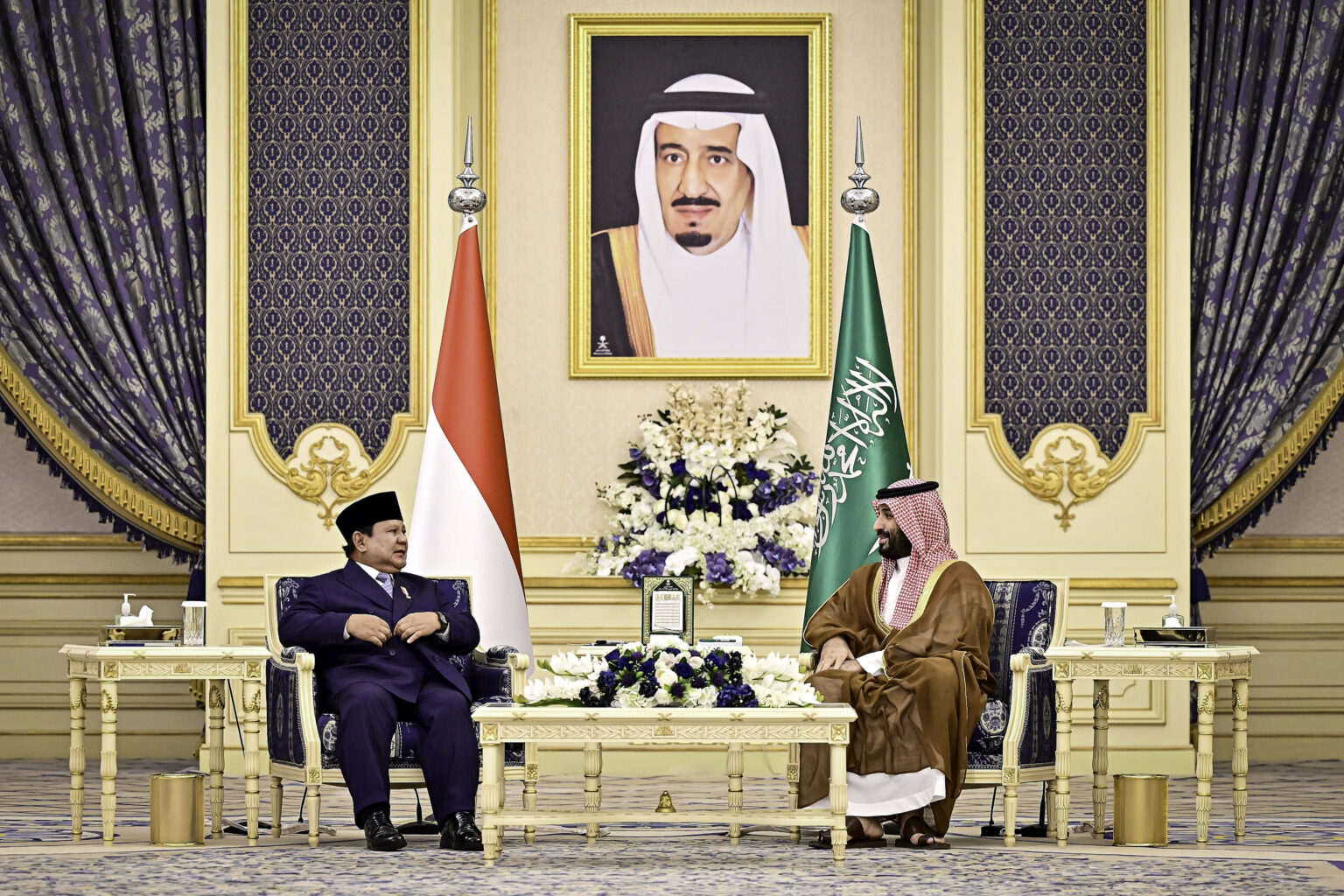
Subianto with Saudi Crown Prince Mohammed bin Salman at the Royal State Palace, Jeddah, Saudi Arabia, 2 July 2025

When it was Prabowo's turn to speak in the D-8 summit, some dignitaries, including Turkish President Recep Tayyip Erdoğan, "walked out" from the summit, nudging Prabowo's seat on his way out. Many at home perceived this diplomatic gaffe as Prabowo being "too preachy" and indirectly offending Erdogan, whose country enjoys NATO support and having diplomatic ties with Israel, briefly straining relations between both countries. However, Cabinet Secretary Teddy Indra Wijaya clarified that Erdogan had already apologised before the conference session started and had requested Prabowo to switch turns with him so that he could leave early to attend a bilateral meeting with another leader. The Turkish Embassy in Indonesia states that relations between Indonesia and Turkey will remain harmonious despite Erdogan's leave.

Prabowo once again advocated for a two-state solution to end the long ongoing conflict in Gaza in front of French president Emmanuel Macron, who some time before meeting Prabowo has announced plans for French recognition of Palestine. He also said that he is open to normalise relations with Israel once Palestinian independence is acknowledged. In his statement, Palestine's independence is the only solution for a long lasting peace in the Middle East while stating that Israel also has an inalienable right to exist as a sovereign state and Indonesia will recognise Israel only after Palestine is fully independent. Despite the idea of recognising Israel after Palestine became independent became controversial, the Indonesian Ulema Council (MUI) endorsed the idea, reminding the public that his statement is not a pro-Israel statement. However, MUI told that Prabowo must hold Israel accountable for their war crimes in Gaza even if he wishes to normalise ties with Israel. The Prosperous Justice Party and the United Development Party also gave their support to Prabowo's statement but told Prabowo to focus more on Palestinian independence first, while PDI-P politician Djarot Saiful Hidayat state that Prabowo should not rush to recognise Israel as a state, as it is considered a violation to the Constitution of Indonesia.

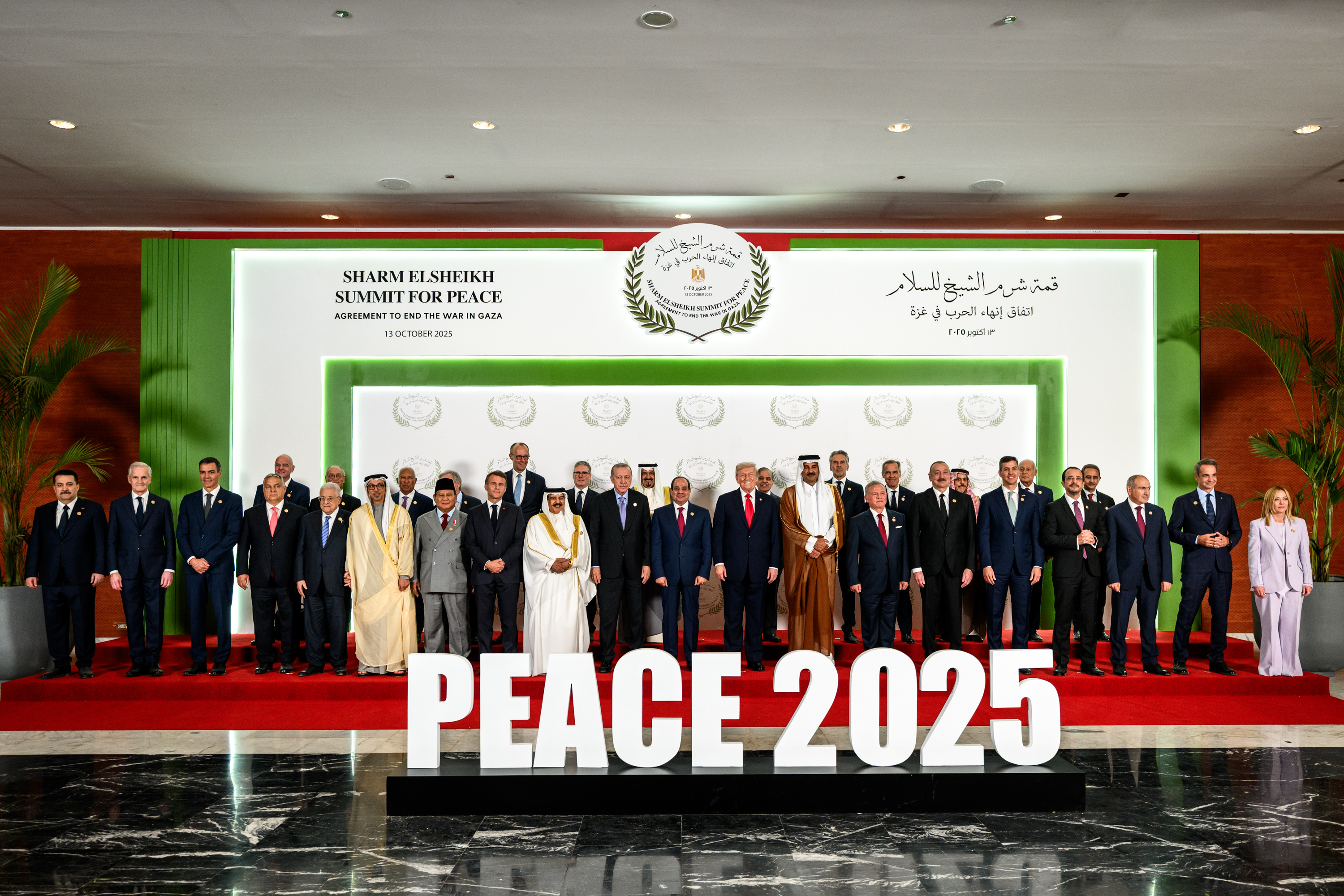
Prabowo at the Gaza peace summit in Sharm El Sheikh, Egypt, 13 October 2025

During the Eightieth session of the United Nations General Assembly, Prabowo reiterated his stance on recognising Israel with the condition that Israel must recognise Palestine as an independent nation. While praising France, United Kingdom, Portugal and other countries for their recognition of Palestine, Prabowo also pressured those who had yet to recognise Palestine to do so as soon as possible to stop the humanitarian crisis there. Once again, it sparked debate in social media with arguments for the two state solution said Prabowo's speech has placed one step closer to peace while arguments against it said that Israel's atrocities has made the two state solution no longer viable and Prabowo had violated the Constitution of Indonesia for saying in favour of Israeli recognition. His speech generated even more controversy in social media after Israeli prime minister Benjamin Netanyahu praised Prabowo's speech. He was nevertheless applauded domestically as Speaker Puan Maharani states her proudness as she considers Prabowo's speech as reflecting Indonesia's commitments to end the humanity crisis in Palestine, while former president Joko Widodo states that Prabowo's speech is a firm and brave message for peace. Internationally, US President Donald Trump was impressed especially when Prabowo pounded the podium as he spoke while French president Emmanuel Macron thanked Prabowo for his "strong" statements and told him that other countries were taking notes of his commitment. Prabowo later told the media that his speech was positively received and he got words of appreciation from numerous state leaders for "truly want to find a middle path", in which he hopes to find a substantial and just way to end the conflict. He later attended the Gaza Peace Summit in Sharm El Sheikh as the sole representative from Southeast Asia, witnessing the signings of the accords and offering Indonesia's support for Gaza's reconstruction while advocating for the two-state solution. In his speech at the 2025 United Nations General Assembly, Prabowo remarked that Indonesia would be willing to provide up "20,000 or even more" peacekeeping personnel in case an UN mission to Gaza was authorised.

==== India ====
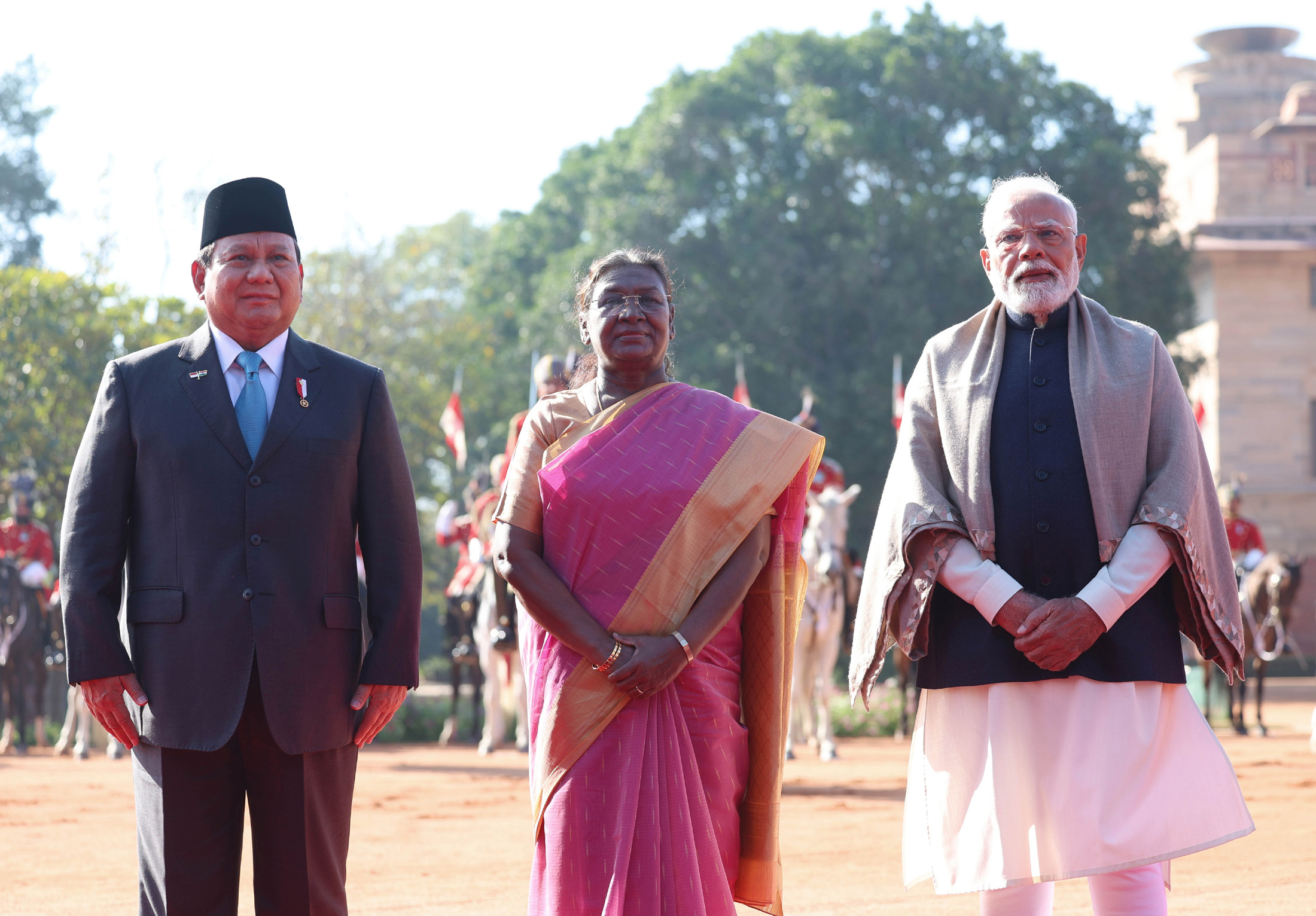
Prabowo with Indian Prime Minister Narendra Modi and President Droupadi Murmu as chief guest of the Republic Day celebration, 2025

Prabowo was invited by Prime Minister Narendra Modi's government as chief guest of the Republic Day celebration in 2025. The visit is to further strengthen the strategic partnership between the two countries. The Indonesian president was welcomed by Minister of State for External Affairs Pabitra Margherita. The trade between the two countries in 2023 stands at USD 29.40 billion. Prabowo was met by the Indian Foreign Minister S. Jaishankar. The Indian Ministry of External Affairs described the relationship as "warm and friendly… spanning over millennia." President Prabowo was given a ceremonial welcome by the President of India Droupadi Murmu and Prime Minister Narendra Modi. Prabowo said Indonesia considers India a great friend and the first country that recognised Indonesian independence. A 352-member Indonesian military marching contingent participated in the Republic Day parade in New Delhi. During the visit the two sides are to discuss and conclude deals in trade, healthcare, digital technologies, energy and tourism, as well as the purchase of the BrahMos supersonic cruise missile.

Prior to his state visit to India in 2025, Prabowo claimed to have a genome test on his ancestry and the test reported him as partially Indian. In front of the Indian government, Prabowo admitted that he danced to Bollywood songs to which he attributed this habit to his DNA test result. He again raised the matter when Narendra Modi visited Indonesia on 2026 and states that he cannot help himself dancing to Indian music despite in a formal setting between both leaders to which he also jokes that his ministers and generals may also have Indian DNA due to how well they sang Indian songs.

==== Russia ====
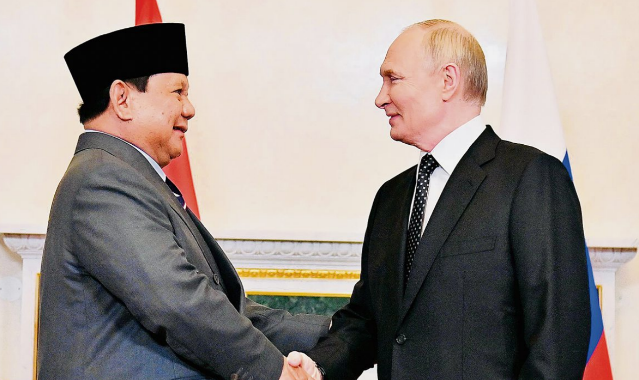
Prabowo and Russian President Vladimir Putin in St. Petersburg, Russia, 19 June 2025

On 19 June 2025, Prabowo attended the St. Petersburg International Economic Forum as a guest of honour. He met Russian President Vladimir Putin and the two heads of state signed a strategic partnership agreement. In addition, the Indonesian and Russian sovereign funds Danantara and the Russian Direct Investment Fund signed an agreement to create an investment fund worth €2 billion (US$2.9 billion). His visit to Russia coincides with the 51st G7 summit at Kananaskis, in which Prabowo was also invited to attend but didn't. Despite the apparent snub cited by Western aligned media, Prabowo clarified his reason to skip the summit is because Indonesia's non-bloc stance and commitment issues made prior to the G7 invitation.

=== Social ===
==== Free school meals (MBG in indonesia)(Makan Bergizi Gratis) ====
His campaign team introduced a goal of a free school school lunch program by distributing free milk and lunch meals. After Prabowo was declared as president-elect, pilot program of the policy was enacted. Prabowo said that he wanted to enact this because he saw nearly 25% of Indonesian children skip their breakfast and he wanted to know if the program could succeed by conducting pilot programs. On 24 May 2024, he changed the program into free nutritious meal program. Overall, this program is designed with the aim of building superior resources, reducing stunting and poverty rates while driving the economy. This program is also one of Prabowo's key policies in realising the Golden Indonesia 2045 Vision that targets the creation of a golden generation by utilising demographic dividends that can launch Indonesia into a developed country.

The program was officially rolled out since 6 January 2025 in 26 provinces of Indonesia, carried out by the National Nutrition Agency, and targeting children from preschool to secondary school students, as well as pregnant and nursing mothers with the aim of able to bring benefit to at least 82,9 million beneficiaries. However, the effectiveness of this policy was repeatedly questioned. With a huge budget needed to execute the program, the program may risk cutting the budget of other social programs and caused economic instability. In addition, the program has been marked by repeated cases of food poisoning; by 15 August 2025, over 1,000 people had been sickened.

==== People's School ====
Prabowo established Sekolah Rakyat, an educational initiative with the aims to break free from poverty through boarding school education. The school will be free of charge and ensure that poor families are given equal educational opportunities under a stable and conducive learning environment. The program was launched on July 2025 with poor and extremely poor families as the main recipients of the program with the government has designated 53 locations across East Java, Papua, Kalimantan and East Nusa Tenggara and aimed to improve human resources quality.

==== Health ====
On 10 February 2025, Prabowo's government enacted a free health check service with aims to improve the quality of life of the population through the use of SatuSehat app launched by the Ministry of Health. The government aimed to decrease mortality rate caused by disease that can be avoided through preventive healthcare such as cardiovascular disease, stroke, diabetes and tuberculosis.

=== New capital ===
Construction of Nusantara under Prabowo's presidency continued despite no longer be considered as priority due to reallocation of other policies such as the free meal program.

On 21 September 2025, Prabowo signed a presidential decree that officially made Nusantara as the political capital city of Indonesia and targeted for its realisation to be implemented in 2028. However, this decree was met with suspicion as the decree only mandated for the House of Representatives and Regional Representative Council to move to Nusantara, while analysts criticise the lack of seriousness to relocate away from Jakarta.

== Political views ==
Prabowo Subianto said in his November 2023 speech at the Institute for Development of Economics and Finance (INDEF) think thank that Indonesia needs a middle way between capitalism and socialism, which would be a Pancasila economy how the third president of Indonesia B.J. Habibie wanted. Besides his own variant of a Third Way, he advocates for anti-neoliberalism. In foreign policy, Prabowo has expressed a desire for closer diplomatic ties with China and India, while calling for distance from the West. In June 2023, during his tenure as defence minister, Prabowo proposed a peace plan to end the Russo-Ukrainian War, involving holding referendums in disputed areas between the two countries, which was subsequently condemned by Ukraine for appearing pro-Russia. Then-president Jokowi later clarified that Prabowo's suggestion was his personal viewpoint and did not reflect the official position of the Indonesian government. In January 2022, Prabowo expressed openness to the normalisation of Indonesia–Israel relations.

== Controversies ==
=== Internal army dispute ===
In 1983, according to Sintong Panjaitan, Prabowo had a dispute with a few generals who plotted to overthrow Suharto to the point that he plotted to use Detachment 81 to attempt kidnapping these generals, including General L. B. Moerdani who was rumoured to be plotting a coup against Suharto. However, his plot was stopped by Luhut Binsar Pandjaitan, the commander of Detachment 81. Prabowo was his deputy commander at that time. Major Luhut Pandjaitan ordered to cancel the attempt and confiscate all weapons and equipment. The threat of a coup against Suharto was later found to be false and Prabowo was given a leave due to stress. However, Prabowo denied Sintong Panjaitan's version of the story by laughing. According to him, it was unreasonable that a captain could lead his troops to fight and kidnap a general. He calmly said that every time there was a new book, there would be a new coup accusation levelled against himself, and left everyone with their own version of the story.

Prabowo was once again involved in a dispute with Moerdani ahead of the 1988 MPR General Assembly. According to Kivlan Zen, rumours persisted that Moerdani would use his office of commander of the Indonesian National Armed Forces to gain support from the ABRI faction to run as vice president to Suharto. Prabowo reported this to Suharto and Suharto heeded Prabowo's report by replacing Moerdani with Try Sutrisno as commander of the armed forces. The position of vice president then fell to Sudharmono. Moerdani's dismissal sparked worries of a coup, however the coup never really happened. Despite this, it showed Prabowo's rising influence in the armed forces and on Suharto's decision making.

=== Occupation of East Timor ===
In 1983, it was claimed that Prabowo commanded the Indonesian special forces responsible for the Kraras massacres in East Timor. The survivors of these massacres were locked up in a concentration camp guarded by Prabowo's men, where many died of starvation and ill-treatment. Prabowo claimed he was nowhere near the Viqueque district when the massacre happened, and neither the UN nor the government of Timor Leste have ever proffered charges of human rights violations against him. José Manuel Tesoro, writing for Asiaweek in 2000, contacted four separate non-governmental organisations including Tapol in London; Solidamor in Jakarta; the HAK Foundation, headquartered in Dili; and the East Timor Action Network (ETAN) in New York, but they could not provide any eyewitness reports, transcripts of intercepted communications, leaked papers, or anything that could substantiate Prabowo's involvement.

=== Kidnapping of activists ===
Between 1997 and 1998, Kopassus members from Team Mawar (Rose Team) were responsible for pro-democracy activists kidnappings of at least 22 people mainly in Jakarta. Nine activists were released and 13 remain missing. In 1999, 11 members of Tim Mawar were found guilty by a military court. However, they appealed the verdict to the Supreme Court, which was not made public and only revealed in 2007, and were never jailed and all but one remained in the military. In September 2020, Defence Minister Prabowo appointed two of the Team Mawar officers, two serving brigadier generals, to senior positions in the Ministry of Defence following approval by President Joko Widodo. Amnesty International criticised the appointments as the President and the DPR had promised to investigate missing activist cases and instead placed suspects in positions of power. and shortly after Prabowo was inaugurated as president two more members of the Team Mawar became heads of the National Cyber and Crypto Agency and the Main Secretariat of the State Intelligence Agency.

=== Paradise Papers ===
In November 2017, an investigation conducted by the International Consortium of Investigative Journalism cited his name in the list of politicians named in "Paradise Papers" allegations.

=== Mirage 2000 purchase ===
On 13 February 2024, the Corruption Eradication Commission had received a report of alleged corruption conducted by Prabowo in the purchase of ex-Qatar Emiri Air Force Dassault Mirage 2000-5 jet aircraft which was cancelled by the Ministry of Defence due to fiscal limitations. Allegedly, the purchased aircraft will be bought at a much higher price and there are gratification involved. Deputy Minister of Defence Muhammad Herindra denied the allegations, dismissing the rumours as slanderous allegations and fake news. In response, the Ministry of Defence appointed lawyer Hotman Paris Hutapea to lead the defence. Despite being mentioned in a report that allegedly uncovered the corruption, Group of States against Corruption (GRECO) stated it had "never have done any work related to Indonesia."

=== Political gaffes ===
On 18 September 2017, at the launch of a book on his father's political economy theory, Prabowo made a speech warning Indonesia could break apart in 2030. "In other countries, they have made studies, where the Republic of Indonesia has been declared no more in 2030," he said. A video clip of the speech was posted to Gerindra's official Facebook page on 18 March 2018. When asked which studies Prabowo was referring to, Gerindra official M. Husein Mohi said, "Prabowo Subianto has read various writings of people that are outside the country, intellectual observers that exist. You can also see them online." It was subsequently revealed the "studies" were actually a 2015 science-fiction war novel called Ghost Fleet by US authors August Cole and P. W. Singer. A note by the authors at the start of the book states: "The following was inspired by real-world trends and technologies. But, ultimately, it is a work of fiction, not prediction." Bemused by Prabowo citing the book, Singer posted on Twitter: "Indonesian opposition leader cites #GhostFleet in fiery campaign speeches... There have been many unexpected twists and turns from this book experience, but this may take the cake."

In November 2018, he was embroiled in controversy for a part of his campaign in Boyolali mentioning the appearance of people in Boyolali, Central Java. After mentioning names of various luxury hotels in Jakarta whose name he claimed the rally can never pronounce, he said, "..but I am sure you have not entered these hotels. If you want to enter them you might be kicked out. You don't look like wealthy people, you have a Boyolali look." This has led to several Boyolali polling stations for 2019 election not voting him at all. Prabowo lost the regency again in 2024 election in spite of overall win in Central Java province. The next month, Prabowo was ridiculed after erroneously stating that Haiti, a republic in the Caribbean, is an African country. In a speech made on 23 December 2018 in Solo, Central Java, Prabowo said the Indonesian government had driven part of Indonesia's wealth offshore. "If this continues to go on, Indonesia will continue to be impoverished," he said. "We, Indonesians, are on par with African impoverished countries such as Rwanda, Haiti, and small islands like Kiribati, which we don't even know where it's located," he added. On 17 January 2019, in the first debate between the candidates in Indonesia's April 2019 presidential election, Prabowo said some Indonesian governors deserve higher salaries considering the size of their provinces. He gave the example of Central Java province, which he claimed is larger than Malaysia. Local media reports pointed out that Central Java is 32,544.12 square kilometres, while Malaysia is 330,323 square kilometres. After the media reported on the error, Prabowo's campaign team claimed he had actually been referring to the population totals of Malaysia and Central Java. In the same debate, Prabowo claimed that terrorist attacks in Indonesia were caused by poverty and perpetrated by non-Muslims disguised as Muslims, sent by other countries and controlled by foreigners. Media reports refuted his claims, pointing out that some Indonesian terrorist bombers were not poor and were not manipulated by foreigners.

On 12 December 2023, Prabowo went viral after his commentary about his rival Anies Baswedan on ethics by saying "Ndasmu etik!" (English: God damn ethics!) which is considered insulting him in an internal party congress held by Gerindra. His spokesperson later stated that it was just a joke. Ndasmu would appear again in Gerindra's 17th anniversary party in Bogor where Prabowo criticizes his critics over the perception that his government was a puppet government of Joko Widodo.

During the anniversary of National Awakening Party on 24 July 2026, Prabowo said that there are still "londo ireng" to criticize perceived enemies of the state to which he describes them as masquerading as journalists, experts and NGOs who only seek to report on the bad results of his government policies. He said that those londo irengs still exists, just changing their clothes. The Association of Indonesian Journalists (AJI) and several other NGOs demanded his apology and criticizes his speech as discrediting their profession, endangering free speech and being tone-deaf to current issues. Hasan Nasbi, special advisor to the president, states that Prabowo's speech was meant to criticize troublemakers and he slammed those who demand the apology for stirring up unnecessary chaos.

On 21 September 2026 in the National Mandate Party 28th anniversary party, Prabowo gave a speech criticizing experts who criticizes his free nutritious meal program, claiming that these so-called "experts" had spread lies and deceit and among these experts he said that they're, "too intelligent that (he/she) became stupid!" (Indonesian: Saking pintarnya jadi goblok).

=== Political endorsement ===
During the 2024 Central Java gubernatorial election, Prabowo gave his public endorsement of support to Ahmad Luthfi and Taj Yasin Maimoen through a video uploaded in Taj Yasin's Instagram account. His endorsement was slammed by the PDI-P, and Deputy Speaker of the People's Consultative Assembly Bambang Wuryanto called the endorsement as "worrying" and reminded Prabowo that he is the president, not just a party leader. Many has also questioned the ethics behind the endorsement as legal experts believed that the president of Indonesia must not meddle around with legal institutions in favour of a candidate and General Election Supervisory Agency (Bawaslu) announced that they will investigate the video for any offences. However, Prabowo's endorsement was also defended as NasDem politician Muhammad Rifqinizamy Karsayuda and Head of Presidential Communication Office Hasan Nasbi said that Prabowo spoke as a party chairman and there is no restrictions on presidents being a chairman of their own parties while Coordinating Minister for Political and Security Affairs Budi Gunawan states that Prabowo's endorsement is a "normal matter" in democracies. Bawaslu found that although the video featuring him did show political campaign message, their investigation result shows that he did not commit any offences because the video was posted within the social media campaign period between 25 September to 23 November, and Prabowo is allowed to campaign for his endorsed candidates as long as either he took his time off from the office or he done it on a holiday, which in Taj Yasin's clarification to Bawaslu states that the video was created on Sunday, 3 November 2024.

=== Allegations of authoritarianism ===
As a president elected in 2024 and being Suharto's son-in-law, Prabowo's leadership style was criticised for his authoritarian style of rule and allegedly revived the practice of Dwifungsi, where active military personnel can concurrently serve in the civilian government while maintaining military command. His background as a military commander rises when Dwifungsi was at its peak of power. The Reformasi that has sought to limit the influence of the military in civilian government has its values now threatened by moves to again empower the military, such as the revision of the Law No. 34 Year 2004.

During his time as defence minister under Joko Widodo, Prabowo is considered to have restored the role of the military in many aspects of civilian life. He was known to involve the military in government programs such as the free meal program, food estate, and many other roles that is supposed to be done by the civilian sector. Few of his cabinet ministers also have military roles, which further strengthens the perception that the direction of government tends to revive New Order-style practices. His most controversial appointment in his cabinet however is when he appointed Teddy Indra Wijaya who was still active in the military to be his cabinet secretary, which generate criticism from academicians and legal experts saying Prabowo has violated the Law No. 34 Year 2004 Article 47 which states that active service members of the Indonesian National Armed Forces must resign or retire from military life if appointed or given a civilian role.

== Personal life ==
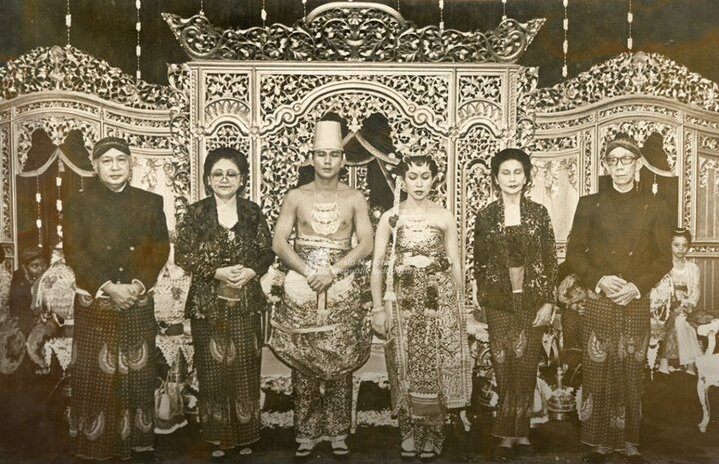
Prabowo (centre left) at his wedding to Titiek Suharto, 1983

Prabowo married Titiek Suharto on 8 May 1983. Titiek is the daughter of Indonesian President Suharto, but the couple separated shortly after Suharto's presidency ended in 1998. Prabowo saw himself as a potential successor to Suharto and remained a strong supporter of the regime. Prabowo and Titiek have one son together, fashion designer Ragowo Hediprasetyo (Didit), who was born in March 1984.

Prabowo is a cat lover and owns a cat named Bobby Kertanegara. Bobby was a stray who was adopted by Prabowo from the streets after a chance meeting, and he often showed up in meetings that Prabowo attended in his residence at Kertanegara. It was revealed later in a small talk with Deputy Prime Minister Angela Rayner that he has 8 cats. Aside from cats, he also owns 18 horses in his hill estate in Jonggol Mountains, Bojong Koneng, Bogor Regency (southeast of Sentul City), and he often invited guests to ride one of his horses, especially when Jokowi and Gibran visited. He had once brought his horse to campaign rallies especially in Gelora Bung Karno Stadium. Because of his hobby of raising horses, Prabowo is known to support equestrian sports as the Equestrian Association of Indonesia once received 28 horses from Prabowo's personal wealth to support the national team in preparation for the 2025 SEA Games while being given a medal target for polo directly from the president. In a bilateral meeting with Prime Minister Mark Carney, Prabowo expressed that he dreamed to become a Mountie during his youth.

Prabowo usually wears khaki clothes with many pockets. He himself stated that he liked this suit for practical reasons. Prabowo started wearing it frequently when he was paired with Megawati in the 2009 presidential election.

In addition to Indonesian, Prabowo speaks the Banyumasan dialect of Javanese, his father's mother tongue, and is fluent in English, Dutch, French, and German. He also has limited proficiency in Arabic, which he learned during his time in Jordan.

=== Religion ===
In an interview in 2018, Prabowo stated that he was a Muslim who adhered to nationalist views. He added that he had insufficient knowledge about Islam. Prabowo has stated that he could not read the Quran fluently.

Prabowo said that he was not born into a family steeped in Islamic teachings but grew up with his colleagues who were members of various Islamic community organisations.

On 13 May 2023, Prabowo stated that he was proud to adhere to Islam, which he considers to be the pioneer in many scientific and technological breakthroughs around the world. On 19 November, he stated that he felt comfortable with adhering to Islamic beliefs from the teachings of Nahdlatul Ulama (NU) because he believed that the latter advocated for a form of Islam that is tolerant, protective of society, and moderate.

=== Health ===
On 30 June 2024, Prabowo announced that he was undergoing a surgery on his left foot via his Instagram account. In his post, he explained that he had injured his left foot twice. He first injured it when he was participating in a paratrooping exercise in West Germany while he was training with GSG 9. Additionally, he experienced another foot injury when he fell down from a cliff in a combat zone in the 1980s. Prabowo, who was 30 at the time of the accident, did not experience further issues until his 2024 campaign, when he was seen walking on a limp on his left foot. This prompted rival supporters to mock his physique. Prabowo underwent a successful surgery on his left foot a week later at the National Defence Central Hospital.

== Published works ==
Year	Indonesian title	English translated title	Publisher	Note
2009	Paradoks Indonesia	The Indonesia Paradox	PT Tunas Interpratama Media	Political manifesto discussing national inequality, sovereignty, and leadership.
2014	Strategi Transformasi Bangsa	A Strategy for National Transformation	PT Tunas Interpratama Media	Outlines political and economic reform strategies.
2019	Bangkitlah Indonesiaku	Rise, My Indonesia	PT Tunas Interpratama Media	Collection of speeches and ideological positions.
2021	Kepemimpinan Militer	On the Art of Military Leadership	PT Media Pandu Bangsa	Commentary on leadership styles on military leaders

== Electoral history ==
Electoral history of Prabowo Subianto
Year	Office	Party	Votes received				Result
Year	Office	Party	Total	%	P.	Swing	Result
2009	Vice President of Indonesia	PDI-P	32,548,105	26.79%	2nd (Note: Ran as running mate.)	—N/a	Lost
2014	President of Indonesia	Gerindra	62,576,444	46.85%	2nd	—N/a	Lost
2019	President of Indonesia	Gerindra	68,650,239	44.50%	2nd	-2.35	Lost
2024	President of Indonesia	Gerindra	96,214,691	58.59%	1st	+14.09	Won

== Honours ==
=== National honours ===
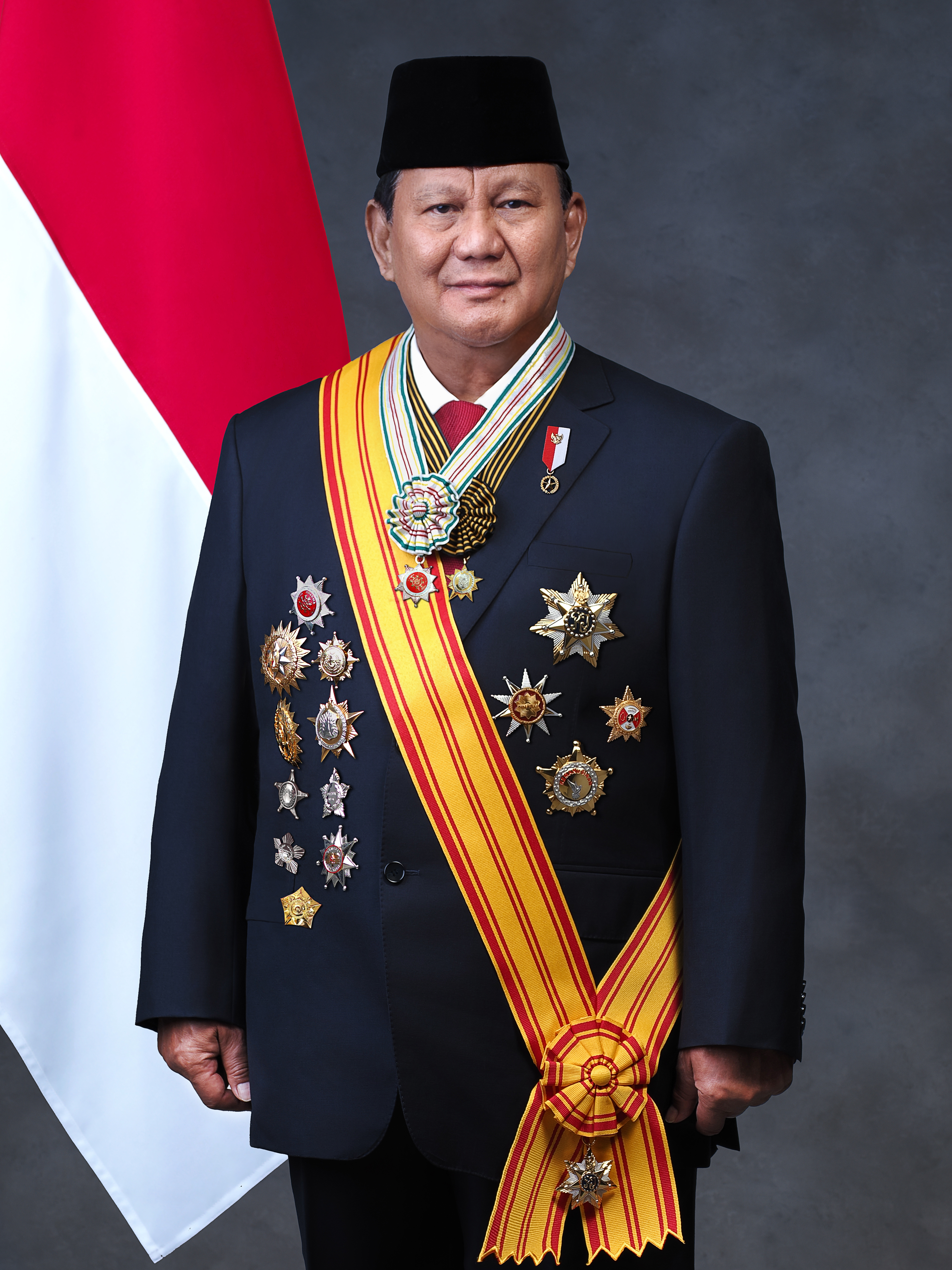
Prabowo's official portrait with his presidential decorations

Prabowo is automatically awarded the highest class of all civilian and military star decorations upon taking office as president, but he had already received several of these awards —and other awards— while serving as minister of defence.

- Star of the Republic of Indonesia, 1st Class – 2024
- Star of Mahaputera, 1st Class – 2024
- Star of Mahaputera, 2nd Class – 2024 (Note: Received the award while serving as minister of defence.)
- Star of Merit, 1st Class – 2024
- Star of Humanity – 2024
- Star of Democracy Upholder, 1st Class – 2024
- Star of Budaya Parama Dharma – 2024
- Star of Bhayangkara, 1st Class – 2024
- Guerilla Star – 2024
- Sacred Star – 2024
- Star of Dharma – 2024
- Star of Yudha Dharma, 1st Class – 2022
- Star of Kartika Eka Paksi, 1st Class – 2022
- Star of Jalasena, 1st Class – 2022
- Star of Swa Bhuwana Paksa, 1st Class – 2022
- Star of Peace Veteran – 2023

In addition, Prabowo has also received the others awards while serving as an Indonesian Army officer:

- Star of Yudha Dharma Pratama, 2nd Class
- Star of Kartika Eka Paksi, 2nd Class
- Star of Yudha Dharma, 3rd Class
- Star of Kartika Eka Paksi, 3rd Class
- Military Long Service Medal, 24 Years
- Military Operation Service Medal in Aceh
- Military Instructor Service Medal
- Military Operation Service Medal IX Raksaka Dharma w/ 1 gold star
- Timor Military Campaign Medal w/ 2 gold star
- Role Model Medal

=== Foreign honours ===
Ribbon	Distinction	Country	Date	Ref.
	Commander of the National Order of Merit	France	1997	
	Knight of the Royal Order of Sahametrei	Cambodia	1997	
	Grand Cordon of the Order of Military Merit	Jordan	1998	
	Grand Commander of the Exalted Order of Malacca (Datuk Seri) (DGSM)	Malaysia	26 July 2022	
	Distinguished Service Order (Military)	Singapore	21 November 2023	
	Collar of the Order of Zayed	United Arab Emirates	13 May 2024	
	Grand Collar of the Order of the Sun of Peru	Peru	14 November 2024	
	Grand Commander of the Most Esteemed Royal Family Order of Johor (DK I)	Malaysia	27 January 2025	
	Member 1st Class of the Most Esteemed Family Order of Laila Utama (Dato Laila Utama) (DK l)	Brunei	14 May 2025	
	Grand Cross of the National Order of the Legion of Honour	France	29 May 2025	
	United States Special Operations Command Medal	United States	4 August 2025	
	Grand Cordon with Brilliants of the Supreme Order of the Renaissance	Jordan	14 November 2025	
	Grand Cross with Collar of the Order of Pakistan (NPk)	Pakistan	9 December 2025	
	Grand Order of Mugunghwa	South Korea	1 April 2026	

=== Other honours ===
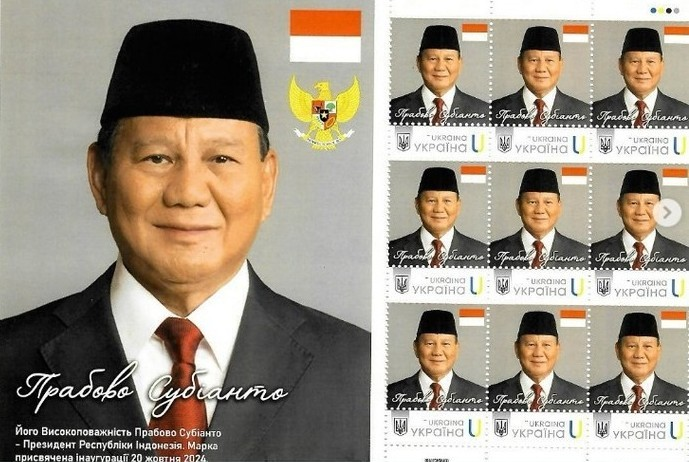
2024 Ukrainian stamp featuring Prabowo

On 17 June 2009, Prabowo was declared a member of the Lumban Tobing clan of the Toba Batak people. The clan awarding was facilitated by the Punguan Siraja Lumban Tobing Association (PPSLB) and took place at the Lake Toba Convention Center, Medan.

On 28 December 2011, Prabowo received the traditional title of Tongkonan from the indigenous people of Siguntu village, Rantepao, North Toraja. The presentation of the traditional title which was accompanied by the Rambu Solo' mourning ceremony was witnessed by the Governor of South Sulawesi Syahrul Yasin Limpo, Deputy Governor of South Sulawesi Agus Arifin Nu'mang, Commander of Kodam VII/Wirabuana Major General Muhammad Nizam, Regent of Tanah Toraja Theofilus Allorerung, Regent of North Toraja Frederik Batti Sorring, along with thousands of local residents.

He also received the title of Friend of Indonesian Santri from the Zainul Hasan Genggong Islamic Boarding School, Probolinggo, on 2 January 2024.

On 28 February 2024, Prabowo was awarded an honorary four-star general rank by President Joko Widodo.

In November 2024, Ukrposhta, Ukraine's national postal service, issued a limited-edition stamp honouring Prabowo. The initiative was spearheaded by the Ukrainian Initiative, an NGO led by Indonesianist Yurii Kosenko, who described the stamp as both a tribute to Prabowo and a symbol of Indonesia-Ukraine friendship.

== See also ==
- List of current heads of state and government
- List of heads of the executive by approval rating
- On the Art of Military Leadership , a two-volume work by Subianto

== Notes ==
Political offices
Preceded by Joko Widodo	President of Indonesia; 20 October 2024 – present	Incumbent
Preceded by Ryamizard Ryacudu	Minister of Defence; 2019–2024	Succeeded by Sjafrie Sjamsoeddin
Party political offices
Preceded by Suhardi	General Chairman of the Gerindra Party; 2014–present	Incumbent
Preceded by Himself as vice-presidential nominee	Gerindra Party nominee for President of Indonesia; 2014, 2019 (lost); 2024 (won)	Most recent
New political party	Gerindra Party nominee for Vice President of Indonesia; 2009 (lost)	Succeeded by Himself as presidential nominee
Military offices
Preceded by Sugiono	Commander of Kostrad; 1998	Succeeded by Johny Lumintang (acting); Djamari Chaniago
Preceded by Subagyo Hadi Siswoyo	Commandant General of Kopassus; 1995–1998	Succeeded by Muchdi Purwopranjono
Order of precedence
First	Indonesian order of precedence President	Succeeded by Gibran Rakabuming Raka as Vice President
