= Fufufafa =

Indonesian internet controversy

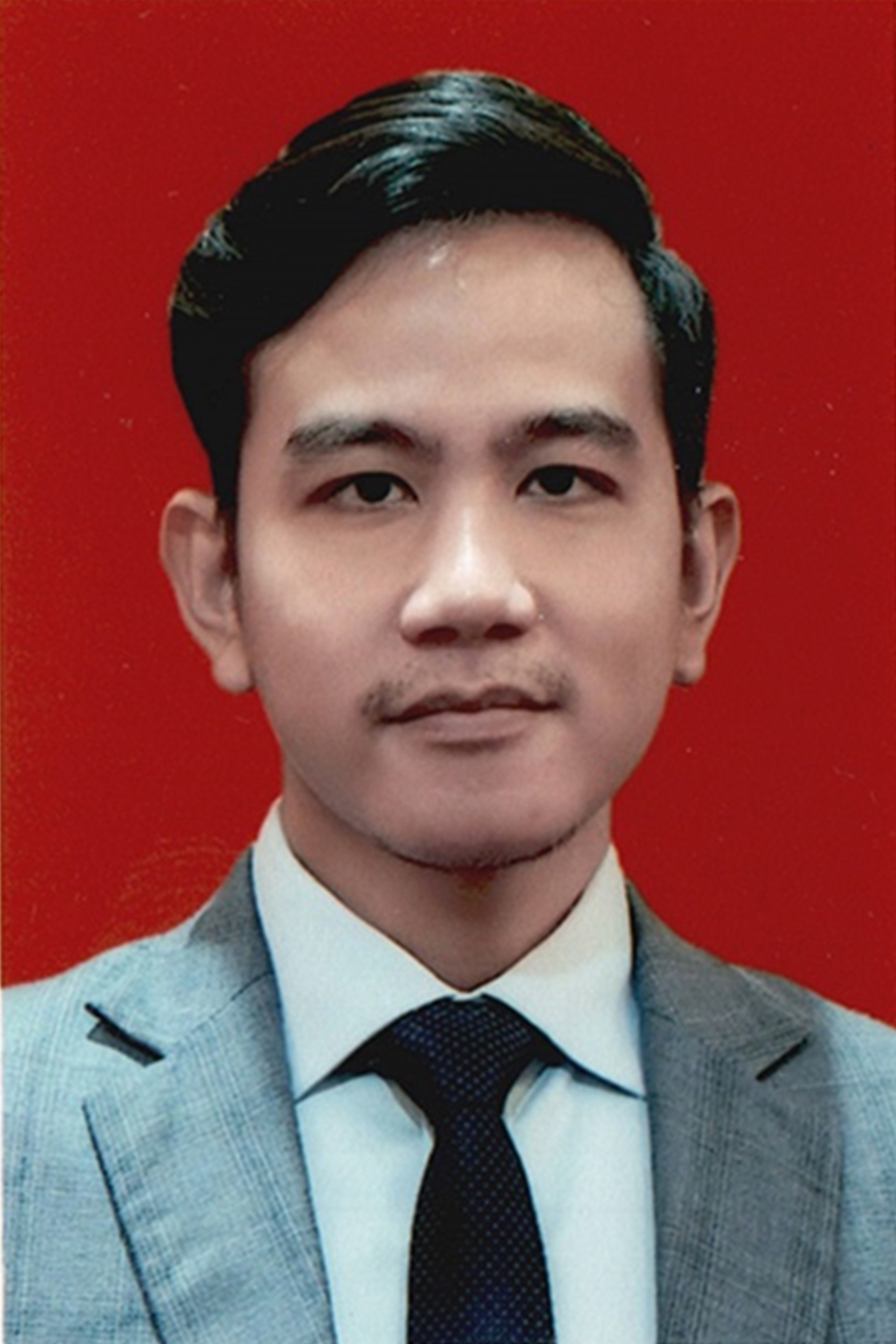
Gibran Rakabuming Raka, who is alleged to be the owner of the account.

fufufafa is a controversial Kaskus account allegedly owned by the former Vice President of Indonesia Gibran Rakabuming Raka. The account was initially exposed in X (formerly Twitter) on 31 August 2024 for insulting Prabowo Subianto (the incumbent President) and his son Didit Hediprasetyo. The account was known to be active from 2013 to 2019. Further investigation found that the account — which voiced support of Joko Widodo's presidency — also insulted former president Susilo Bambang Yudhoyono, Prabowo's ex-wife Titiek Suharto, as well as former Governor of Jakarta Anies Baswedan (a candidate in the 2024 Presidential Race). fufufafa also made inappropriate and sexually suggestive remarks towards a number of celebrities, namely Syahrini, Cinta Laura, Nadia Mulya, Bella Shofie, Pevita Pearce, Duo Serigala, Haruka Nakagawa, Nurul Arifin, Wanda Hamidah, Kartika Putri, and Rachel Maryam. The fufufafa account was also found to have made racist and offensive comments against various groups, including the indigenous people of New Guinea. As of date, there is no certainty or confirmation given by the government on the identity of the account's owner.

== Investigation ==
=== Chilli pari connection ===
Avatar of CHILLI PARI CATERING

CHILLI PARI CATERING
(@Chilli_Pari)
tweeted:

beli gunting yg kayak di Steak Gunting PIK dimana ya? #nanyaserius

November 3, 2014, 11:06 a.m.

Translation:

fufufafa ●●●●●●●●●●●
KASKUS Addict | 3 Nov 2014, 08:04
Guys, sorry stupid question
beli gunting yg kayak di Steak Gunting PIK dimana ya?

November 3, 2014, 8:04 a.m.

On 3 September 2024, the X account '@_mardial_' uploaded a screenshot of a Kaskus account named fufufafa, dated 3 November 2014, asking where to buy steak-cutting scissors at 8:04 AM. The post also included a screenshot of a tweet by the X account Chilli Pari, which is the name of the catering business started by Gibran, asking the same question at 11:06 AM on the same date, using the same formatting. The fufufafa account is also known to have posted that it "forgot the password of the Raka Gnarly account." fufufafa's account also wrote that he is named 'Raka' with the X account '@rkgbrn'. The Raka Gnarly account was created in December 2006 and was last active on 7 October 2011. A Kaskus account named fufufafa was created in July 2013 and last commented in 2019. These accounts have also been known to denigrate labourers.

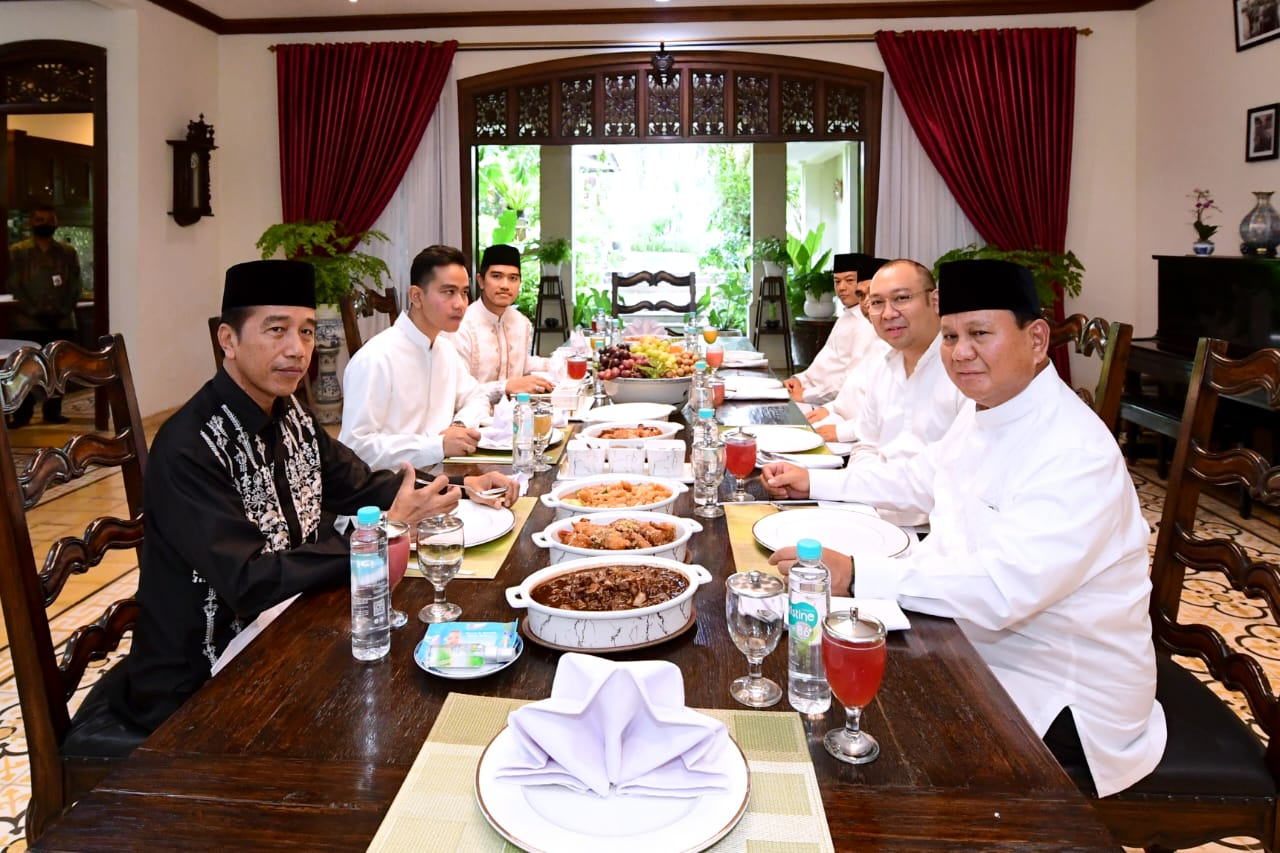
The image of Gibran looking at Didit during a gathering was widely shared across social media amidst fufufafa's insults toward Prabowo and Didit.

Several posts from the fufufafa account from 2014 has stirred controversy by targeting Prabowo Subianto and his family, including his son, Didit Hediprasetyo, such as, "Divorced wife, gay son, so who will you celebrate Eid with?", "Poor presidential candidate with a gay designer son," and "After being mualaf, he gets divorced, has a gay son, has one testicle left, failed to run for president, and is out of money." These social media jabs have drawn criticism, with some labeling them as insulting and homophobic. Indonesian netizens also discovered a humorous poem about Prabowo made by fufufafa in 2014. In the poem, fufufafa imagines Prabowo climbing Mount Semeru, upon reaching the summit, Prabowo raises the red-and-white flag and calls for reconciliation with Titiek Suharto, Prabowo's ex-wife, whom he separated in 1998. At the time, rumors of Prabowo's intention to reconcile with Titiek were rampant. After that moment, the poem humorously describes Prabowo "rolling down the mountain like a hedgehog. Upon reaching the bottom, he immediately buys a roasted corn."

Further investigation revealed that fufufafa had a history of making inappropriate and sexually suggestive comments towards several celebrities, often focusing on the physical attributes of the individuals targeted. For one notable instance, fufufafa made crude remarks on wanting to touch Syahrini, a well-known Indonesian singer, and actress, which were received by netizens as highly inappropriate and sexist. Similarly, Cinta Laura, Nadia Mulya, Bella Shofie, and many other celebrities was subjected to comments that objectified them. It is not known for sure how many victims of the comments that harassed the fufufafa account. However, due to the findings, the fufufafa account continued to fuel public criticism. The keyword "susu" (milk) was also trending and had been discussed 17 thousand times on X (formerly Twitter), with it referring to fufufafa's repeated usage of the word in many of his sexual comments. It was reported that the Formspring account "raka gnarly", infamous for posting sexual comments on the site, was also allegedly owned by Gibran.

There are also other connections on Twitter connecting Gibran and his various accounts. Kaesang Pangarep, brother of Gibran, once wished the latter a "happy birthday" message on Twitter using the handle '@rkgbrn'. Another proof that Raka Gnarly is suspected of being Gibran is his writing replying to the comment of the account '@alvindropdead' on 12 August 2009, asking on where his college is. Raka Gnarly then reveals that he was at 'MDIS'. MDIS being an abbreviation of the Management Development Institute of Singapore where Gibran graduated in 2022. Another Twitter user by the handle '@UmiAbabil' refers to the '@rkgbrn' and Chilli Pari catering account as 'Gibran' multiple times along the course of 2012 to 2013. The Twitter account @Chilli_Pari has been associated with Gibran through multiple interactions. Kaesang Pangarep referred to himself as Chilli Pari's "Younger brother", with the Chili Pari account revealed that Kaesang had a habit of wanting to asks for money transfers. Celebrity chef Arnold Poernomo also sent a "Get well soon" message to the account in July 2021, addressing Gibran during his recovery from COVID-19. The Directorate General of Taxes once also tagged Kaesang and Chilli Pari in their post in wanting to have a reunion in their office. Additionally, The Indonesian Solidarity Party Twitter account once also tagged Chilli Pari for congratulating the birth Gibran's second son. Even former Indonesian President Joko Widodo also publicly acknowledged the account in March 2019, calling for unity between his sons, Kaesang and Gibran, in response to an exchange between Chilli Pari and Kaesang's business rivalry. At one point in 2015 when a user noted that the Chilli Pari account cannot be owned by Gibran and must be owned by several admins, the Chilli Pari account personally dismisses such claims. Overall confirming the links between Chilli Pari and Gibran.

Beyond Twitter, netizens further found connections between the accounts of Chilli Pari and fufufafa with Gibran through the interaction between the two accounts. In November 2013, the Kaskus user fufufafa responded to a Tempo article reporting on remarks by the Minister of Cooperatives and Small and Medium Enterprises, Syarifuddin Hasan, who stated that Indonesia's lack of progress was due to the people's ingratitude toward the government. In the reply, fufufafa sarcastically thanked the ministry for previously ordering from "his catering company" and expressed hope that the food had been satisfactory for the ministers. Another case connecting the two accounts appeared on 29 October 2024, where netizens found out that both Chilli Pari and fufufafa bought a Samsung Galaxy Tab S on the same day of purchase and boasted the purchase on the internet with a difference of 30 minutes. One clear connection between Chilli pari and fufufafa was the connection to Gibran's former account Raka Gnarly which both accounts complained on not being able to login to. Though fufufafa's post had additionally mentioned Gibran's former private twitter account '@rkgbrn' and its name 'Raka'. Further investigation by netizens uncovered more evidence linking Gibran to the fufufafa account. One such piece of evidence was a Kaskus thread titled "Andi Arief: Jokowi 'Hides' His First Son." On 6 June 2014, fufufafa commented on the post, saying, "Come here, you dog. I am not hiding. Here, I'll serve you." On 10 October 2014, Jokowi introduced Gibran in his first media appearance, specifically done to protest being called an 'illegitimate child' by someone in a 'black campaign'.

=== Anonymous identity leak ===
On 11 September 2024, the fufufafa account was caught deleting 2,100 posts from a total of around 5,000 posts, leaving 2,906 posts. Allegations of Gibran's ownership of the fufufafa account were further substantiated after the hacker group Anonymous Indonesia, affiliated with Anonymous, exposed personal information linked to the account. This included the National Identification Number, telephone number, email address, job, education history, parents' names, career details, and even personal vehicles used by the fufufafa account and Chilli Pari. Indonesian netizens then launched a manhunt using the leaked email and phone number, eventually tracing them back to Gibran. Pro-government accounts in Indonesia—known as buzzers—attempted to dismiss and discredit the reliability of the information leaked by Anonymous Indonesia. In response, the hacker group later leaked Gibran's identity card.

On 20 September 2024, a search to confirm Gibran's ownership of the fufufafa account went viral on social media after the user '@YourAnonId_' attempted to make a Go-Pay transfer to the phone number obtained by the previous hacking. The result showed the name Gibran Rakabuming Raka. However, it was later reported that the name had been changed to Slamet. VOI.id confirmed the method initially used by the Twitter user '@YourAnonId_' in attempting to link the Fufufafa account to a bank account registered under the name of Gibran Rakabuming Raka. The report detailed the process used to verify the connection, which involved referencing a virtual account number allegedly associated with Gibran's financial transactions. Media Indonesia confirmed the phone number associated with a bank virtual account in question was verified to belong to Gibran. The report emphasized that the name linked to such registered at Go-Pay cannot be arbitrarily altered by users, as any change would require a formal verification process through the bank's system. Even after the associated name was reportedly changed to "Slamet", VOI.id journalists conducted a direct verification by initiating a bank transfer using the leaked phone number's virtual account registered at Bank Central Asia. The transaction process revealed that the virtual account remained registered under the full name of Gibran Rakabuming Raka, thereby reinforcing the initial identification of the account holder. VOI also confirmed whilst the Go-Pay account had changed, the phone number registered at another e-wallet service, OVO, still used Gibran's name.

Tempo reconfirmed that the same phone number that was leaked by Anonymous had previously been used by Tempo journalists to contact Gibran before and during his tenure as Mayor of Solo. This connection was further substantiated when users attempted a self-service password reset (SSPR) on Kaskus for the "fufufafa" account using the leaked phone number and email by anonymous and observed that the verification email had actually been successfully sent to the account owner. Using an online telephone directory, Getcontact, netizens found out that the number was titled as Gibran Rakabuming Raka, with multiple other titles left by friends and business associates such as "Chili Pari-Bos Gibran", "Walikota Gibran" (Mayor Gibran), "Jokowi Gibran Anak Sulung" (Jokowi Gibran First Child), and many others. On 23 September 2024, it was also revealed that the phone number used by the fufufafa account was the same number Gibran had listed when registering as a candidate in the 2020 Surakarta mayoral election.

== Reactions ==
Indonesian behavioral neuroscience expert Dr. Tifauzia Tyassuma, Ph.D., suggested that fufufafa's tweets exhibited symptoms resembling schizophrenia. Indonesian politician Roy Suryo stated that he was "99.9% certain" the fufufafa account was owned by Gibran. As a result, he was reported to the Police Criminal Investigation Agency by a group called Jokowi's Underground Forces. Rizieq Shihab called for action to "wipe out" fufufafa. Meanwhile, Petrus Selestinus expressed concerns that Gibran could be at risk of being canceled as Vice President of Indonesia by the MPR if it were proven that he owned the fufufafa account.

On 11 September 2024, then Minister of Communication and Information, Budi Arie, promised to reveal the true owner of the fufufafa account. He later stated that the account definitely does not belong to Gibran. When asked further, Budi was unsure about who the actual owner is. Budi Arie, who also serves as founder and Chairman of Projo, a pro-Jokowi organization, believes that the Fufufafa controversy was intentionally created to divide the public. In a follow-up statement, Budi reiterated his promise to reveal the owner of the Fufufafa account, stating that the controversy has been under investigation since the beginning of its virality. However, he did not provide details on when this disclosure would take place. A week after the initial statement, Budi declined to provide further comments or answer questions regarding the Fufufafa controversy, stating that there were many other problems than discussing the Fufufafa account. In October 2024, Budi Arie was replaced by Meutya Hafid during a cabinet reshuffle during the Prabowo presidency. Roy Suryo believes that the lack of adequate clarification from the previous administration had left a heavier burden and unresolved controversies for the new minister to handle. He then condemned the former minister for silencing the fufufafa controversy.

Indonesian human rights activist Veronica Koman expressed outrage, condemning fufufafa's racist statements as not a matter to be taken lightly. Amnesty International Indonesia Director Usman Hamid said the police have an obligation to investigate racist, sexist and misogynistic speech written by the fufufafa account on Kaskus. However, Usman is not sure the police will have the courage to investigate fufufafa.

Grace Natalie, leader of the Indonesian Solidarity Party and a close acquaintance of Gibran, believes that the fufufafa account does not belong to Gibran. Hasto Kristiyanto, Secretary General of the Indonesian Democratic Party of Struggle, commented that "many are throwing stones while hiding their hands" in relation to the fufufafa account. Meanwhile, Kaskus founder Andrew Darwis noted that it would be difficult to find and prove that the fufufafa account is owned by Gibran.

=== Gibran's reaction ===
Gibran Rakabuming Raka, usually active on social media, has not been seen online since the emergence of the controversial fufufafa account. On 10 September 2024 amidst the height of the fufufafa controversy, Gibran responded to the controversy after prolonged silence. After visiting Sondakan in Surakarta for a blusukan event, he was repeatedly questioned by reporters about his alleged connection to the fufufafa account. In response, Gibran tersely stated, "Huh? I don't know, why are you asking me? Ask the owner." When pressed further, he was reluctant to give further answers and avoided other questions asked by the reporters during the event.

== Anti-fufufafa protests ==
=== Action 411 ===
Action 411 was a protest that was held on 4 November 2024, taking place in front of the Istiqlal Mosque, Central Jakarta. The action was initiated by the Muslim Brotherhood Forum (FPI). The purpose of the action was to demand the trial of the former 7th President of Indonesia, Joko Widodo. In addition, the action also demanded the destruction and arrest of fufufafa. In addition, there was also a similar action on the same day in front of the DKI Jakarta Bawaslu building on Jalan M.T. Haryono headed by the head of the Betawi Community Organisation, David Darmawan, demanding Suswono's arrest in relation to a joke about a rich widow marrying an unemployed man likened to Siti Khadijah's relationship with Muhammad.

=== Portrait protest ===
The controversy surrounding the "fufufafa" account has led many Indonesian netizens to express opposition to displaying Gibran Rakabuming Raka's photograph alongside that of President-elect Prabowo Subianto. Public opinion on this matter is divided as critics argue that the allegations linked to the account cast doubt on Gibran's suitability for the vice-presidential role. A particular incident that drew significant attention involved an official vice-presidential portrait of Gibran hanging beside the Faculty of Law flag at Gadjah Mada University. The image went viral, eliciting widespread criticism and revulsion. Additionally, images depicting Gibran's portrait appearing cracked or smashed circulated on social media, with some users suggesting these occurrences had 'happened by itself', humorously interpreting them as an omen. Even so, the placement of the state emblem alongside the presidential and vice-presidential portraits is mandated by law, specifically outlined in Article 51 and Article 55 of Law No. 24/2009, which governs the proper installation of the state emblem. According to this law, the state emblem must be displayed together with the image of the president and/or the vice president.

== In popular culture ==
Ganyang Fufufafa
Sung by Muhammad Rizieq Shihab during the Jemaah congregation event in September 2024. The song has become popular among protestors.

The name fufufafa was used as part of the title of the discussion 'Angry to Private Jet and Fufufafa' held at Kalijaga, Blok M, South Jakarta on 12 September 2024 and was later cancelled unilaterally. At the drawing of numbers for the 2024 East Java gubernatorial election, supporters of candidate pairs Luluk Nur Hamidah–Lukmanul Khakim and Tri Rismaharini–Zahrul Azhar Asumta both shouted 'fufufafa'.

A meme about the name fufufafa became popular on the internet after Muhammad Rizieq Shihab criticised Gibran's alleged nepotism by singing the nursery rhyme "Menanam Jagung" by Saridjah Niung, but with the lyrics twisted to 'ayo-ayo ganyang fufufafa' (let's destroy fufufafa), implying a call to hate fufufafa. Since then, the chant has been used by student protesters during 2025 protests at Purwokerto and Semarang.
