= Aksi Kamisan =

Weekly protest in Jakarta, Indonesia

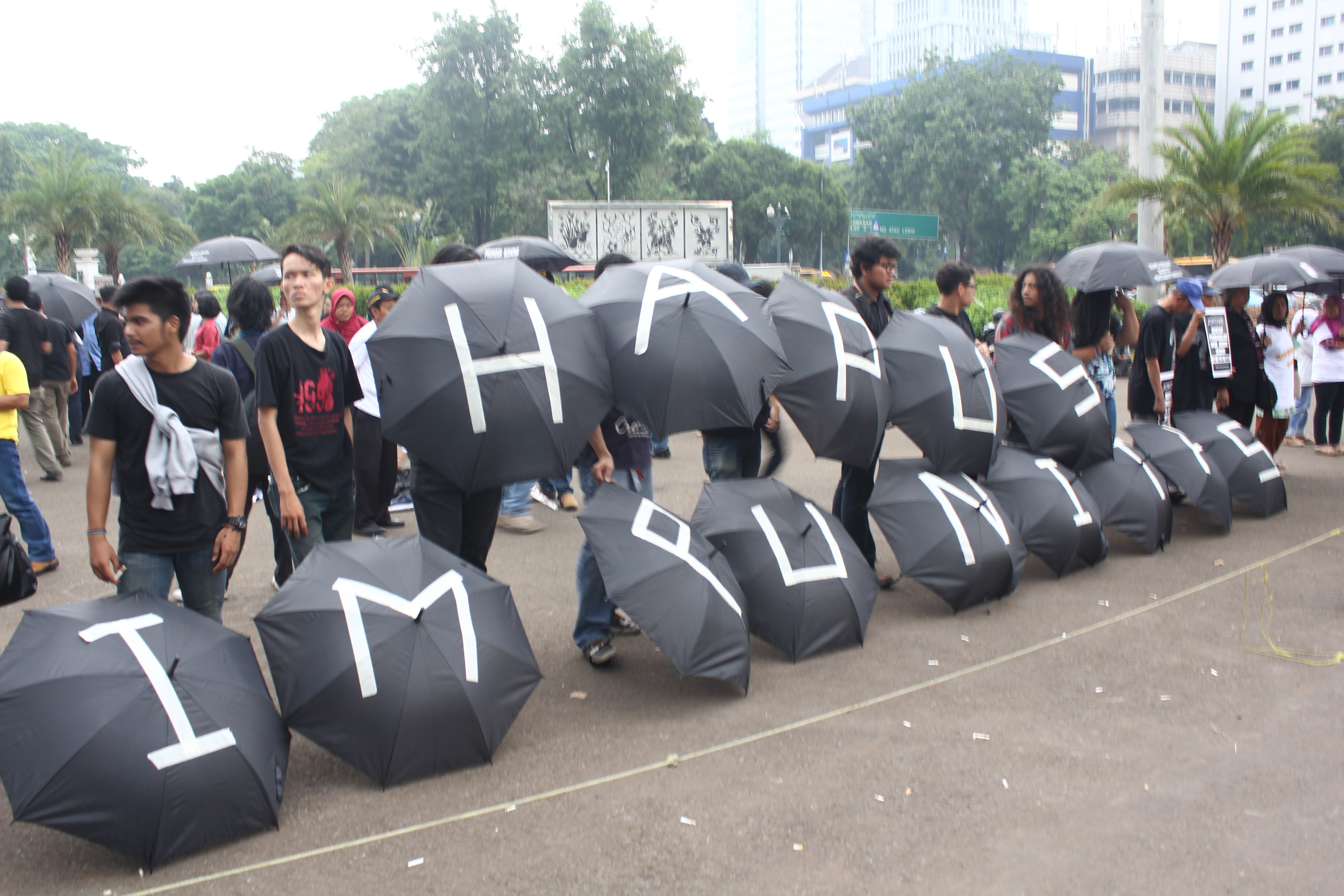
An Aksi Kamisan in 2014 demanded to "erase the impunity"

Aksi Kamisan (Thursday Action) is a weekly silent protest held every Thursday in front of the Merdeka Palace in Jakarta, Indonesia.

Since it started in January 2007, the movement has been led by victims and families of victims of human rights violations in Indonesia. The protesters are known for their use of black clothing and black umbrellas, which symbolize grief and the search for justice.

== History ==
The movement was founded by Maria Katarina Sumarsih, whose son was killed during the Semanggi tragedy, Suciwati the widow of murdered human rights activist Munir Said Thalib, and Bedjo Untung, a survivor of the 1965-66 anti-communist purges.

Originally called Aksi Diam (Silent Action), the protesters stood in front of the State Palace to demand the President of Indonesia officially address past human rights violations. The protest was inspired by the Mothers of the Plaza de Mayo in Argentina who protested the disappearance of their children during the Dirty War.

== Key Symbols ==
- Black Clothing representing grief of the families and their resilience and determination.
- Black Umbrellas used to protect protesters from heat and rain, and which have become symbols of the “protection" the government has failed to provide its citizens.
- Silence which is meant to highlight that the voices of victims have been ignored by successive governments.

== Demands ==
The Aksi Kamisan protesters call for the legal resolution of several high-profile cases of human rights abuses, some of which include:

- 1965 - 66 mass killings. The state sponsored purge of suspected communists.
- Trisakti and Semanggi shootings in 1998 and 1999. The shooting of student protesters during the fall of the Suharto regime.
- Enforced disappearances 1997 - 1998. The kidnapping of pro democracy activists.
- Assassination of Munir in 2004. The poisoning of Indonesia's most prominent human rights investigator.
- Wasior and Wamena incidents. Human rights violations in the Papua region.

== Impact ==
As of 2025 Aksi Kamisan has surpassed 800 weeks of continuous protest. The movement has expanded beyond Jakarta, with actions now held in other Indonesian cities such as Bandung, Yogyakarta, and Malang.

While various presidents have met with the protesters, the movement remains critical of the government's tendency to offer non-judicial settlements (i.e. reconciliation with-out trials) rather than holding perpetrators accountable in court.
