= Muchdi Purwopranjono =

Indonesian politician and former major general

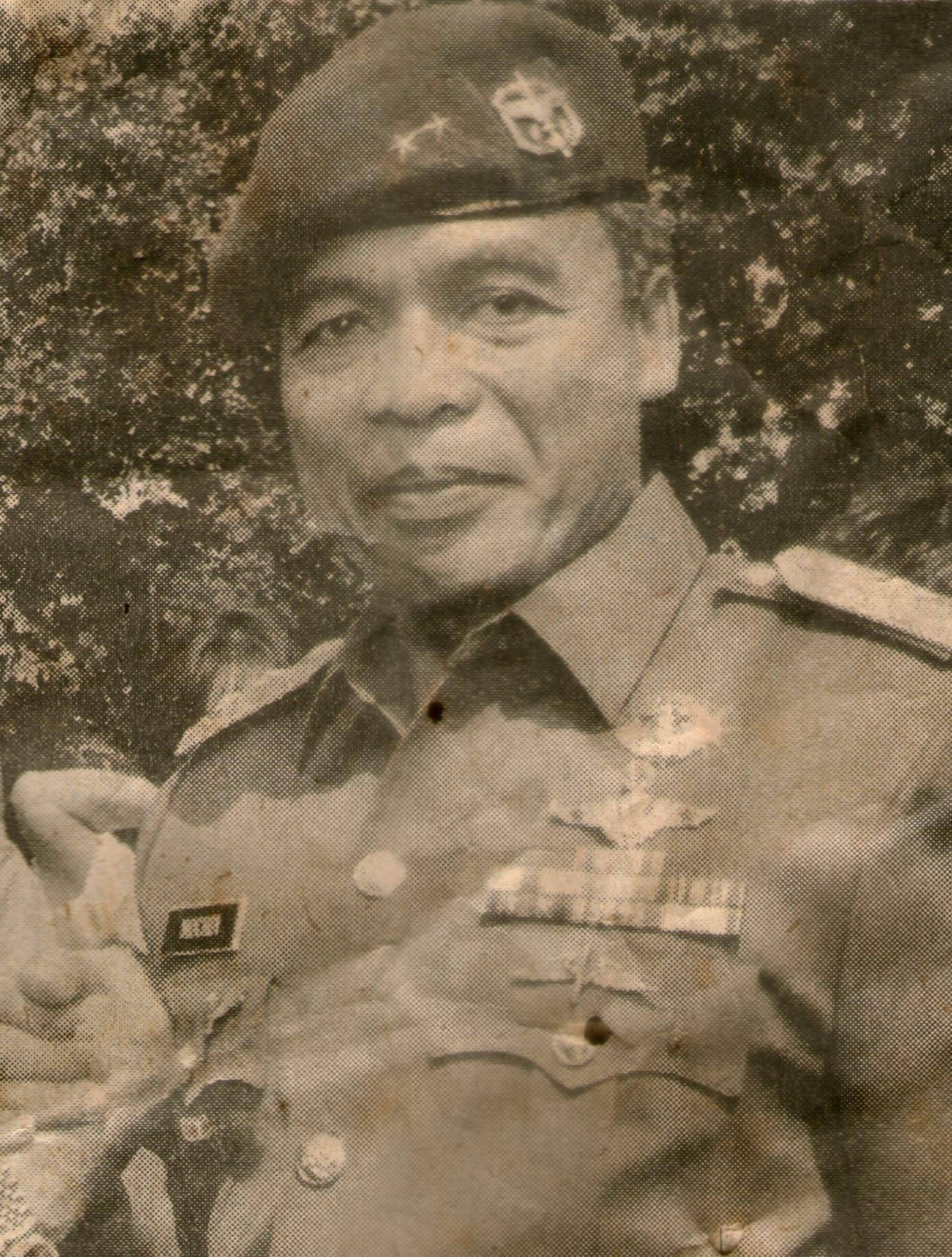
- Purwoprandjono in 1998

Chairman of the Berkarya Party
- In office 11 July 2020 – 16 July 2025
- Preceded by: Tommy Suharto
- Succeeded by: Muhammad Ridwan Andreas

Commandant General of Kopassus
- In office 22 March 1998 – 23 May 1998
- Preceded by: Prabowo Subianto
- Succeeded by: Syahrir MS

Member of the People's Consultative Assembly
- In office 1 October 1997 – 1998
- Parliamentary group: Regional Delegations

Personal details
- Born: 15 April 1949 (age 77) Sleman, Indonesia
- Party: Berkarya (since 2018)
- Other political affiliations: Gerindra (2008–2011); PPP (2011–2016); Independent (2016–2018)
- Spouse: Puji Astuti
- Children: Raditya Muhas Juvirawan, Dewi Kirana Juvirawati, Dias Baskara Dewantara
- Education: Indonesian Military Academy

Military service
- Allegiance: Indonesia
- Branch/service: Indonesian Army; State Intelligence Agency
- Years of service: 1970–2005
- Commands: Kopassus
- Battles/wars: Operation Lotus; Insurgency in Aceh; Papua conflict

Major General (Ret.) Muchdi Purwopranjono (born 15 April 1949) is an Indonesian politician and former major general who served briefly as Commandant General of the Indonesian Army's Special Forces (Kopassus) and was former deputy head of the State Intelligence Agency (BIN). He was relieved of command duties in 1998 after the fall of Suharto and was subsequently deemed responsible for abductions of pro-democracy activists. In 2008, he was acquitted of commissioning and assisting in the 2004 assassination of human rights campaigner Munir Said Thalib, following a trial deemed flawed by human rights organizations. He is presently the leader of a breakaway faction of Tommy Suharto’s Berkarya Party and his leadership is recognized by the government.

== Early life ==
Muchdi was born on 15 April 1949 in Sleman, Yogyakarta. He is the sixth of nine siblings. He has said his father was a leader of Masyumi, an Islamic party, and his mother's family belonged to the Nahdlatul Ulama Muslim mass organization. As a teenager, Muchdi was involved in the Indonesian Muslim Students (PII). Later, he served as deputy chairman of the Family of Indonesian Muslim Students (KBPII), an organization that considers communism and LGBT among the greatest threats to Indonesia.

Muchdi has expressed pride in having been a member of "Generation 66", the generation that helped to bring down founding president Sukarno and replace him with Suharto. Muchdi said he was involved in the Indonesian Student Youth Action Front (KAPPI) in Yogyakarta and often took part in demonstrations.

== Military career ==
After completing high school, Muchdi entered the Military Academy in 1967 and graduated in 1970. He served in East Timor four times. Muchdi became close to fellow soldier Prabowo Subianto, as both were tough fighters and Muslims. Muchdi's later promotions in the military were attributed to his connection to Prabowo, who in 1983 had married then-president Suharto's daughter Siti Hediati Hariyadi. Starting in 1995, Muchdi was promoted three times in three years from colonel to brigadier general to major general.

Muchdi has said that in 1986, while he was training at the Army Staff and Command College (Seskoad) in Bandung, he was summoned by the Intelligence Task Force of the Operational Command for the Restoration of Security and Order (Kopkamtib) in Jakarta and detained for three days on accusations of having been a member of the Pemuda Rakyat (People's Youth) division of the Indonesian Communist Party (PKI) prior to his entry to AKABRI (the Indonesian Armed Forces Academy). He countered that his parents and family had actually been targets of the PKI in Yogyakarta 1965.

Muchdi served in territorial command posts in Irian Jaya (now Papua) from the late 1980s to mid-1990s, Jambi (1995–96), East Java (1996–97) and Kalimantan (1997–98). In 1998, he was Kopassus commander for three months. In May 1998 he was removed from structural duties following the resignation of Suharto. In August 1998 an Indonesian Military (TNI) Officers' Honorary Council (Dewan Kehormatan Perwira) ruled Muchdi was among those responsible for the 1997-98 kidnappings of pro-democracy activists. After that, Muchdi was a general without a command portfolio at TNI headquarters.

=== Military and intelligence positions ===
- 1971-1972: Platoon Commander of Taruna Military Academy
- 1972-1974: Para-commando Platoon Commander
- 1974-1979: Para-commando Company Commander
- 1979-1988: Commander of Karsa Yudha special warfare group
- 1988-1995: Commander of 1701 Jayapura Military District (Irian Jaya, now Papua)
- 1993-1995: Chief-of-staff of Biak 173 Military Resort Command (Irian Jaya, now Papua)
- 1995-1996: Commander of 042 Military Resort Command/Garuda Putih (Jambi) (rank of Colonel)
- 1996-1997: Chief of staff of Military District Command V/Brawijawa (East Java) (rank of Brigadier General)
- 1997: Operations Assistant for Military Regional Command IX/Udayana (Bali and Eastern Indonesia)
- 1997-1998: Commander-in chief of Military Regional Command VI/Tanjungpura (Kalimantan) (rank of Major General)
- March–May 1998: Commandant General of Kopassus
- 1998-2001: Senior Officer without command at TNI Headquarters
- 2001-2005: Deputy chief V of State Intelligence Agency (BIN)

=== Promotion to Commandant General of Kopassus ===
Muchdi's promotion to the leadership of Kopassus on 28 March 1998 came at the behest of his friend and predecessor Prabowo, who was being promoted to chief of the Army's Strategic Reserve Command (Kostrad). Then-Army chief Wiranto opposed Muchdi being installed as Kopassus chief and instead favored Brigadier General Sang Nyoman Suwisma, a Hindu. But Wiranto was outmaneuvered by Prabowo, who was close to Suharto. As Wiranto recounted in his memoir Witness in the Storm:

When I became Army Chief of Staff … it was decided that the new commander of Kopassus replacing Prabowo would be Brig. Gen. Suwisma. But the decision could not be carried out because Prabowo had gone directly to President Suharto and argued with him to cancel Suwisma's appointment. The argument he presented to President Suharto was that the new commander should espouse the same religion as that of the majority of Kopassus members. Otherwise, it would be difficult for the elite force to carry out its mission.... Prabowo then personally proposed Maj. Gen. Muchdi PR, who was then military commander in Kalimantan. I was certainly very disappointed by such maneuvers. So I told President Suharto the real story…. I also said I would be responsible for the decision. But I found out later that I was too late because then ABRI Commander General Feisal Tanjung had signed the decision bypassing me as Army Chief, arguing that the President had wanted it to go in that direction.

Muchdi spent fewer than 60 days as Kopassus chief amid the financial crisis, riots and pro-democracy movement that led to Suharto's resignation.

=== Loss of Kopassus command ===
When Suharto resigned on 21 May 1998, Muchdi accompanied Prabowo to the Jakarta residence of new president B.J. Habibie at 11pm to present a draft cabinet line-up and recommended changes to the military leadership. Later that night, Muchdi reported to a gathering of Muslim leaders the meeting with Habibie had gone well. However, Habibie instead favored General Wiranto, who recommended Muchdi be sacked as Kopassus chief. After Habibie agreed, Wiranto instructed Army chief Subagyo Hadiswoyo to relieve Prabowo and Muchdi of their duties.

During the May 1998 riots, Wiranto had assigned Kopassus officers, under the command of Muchdi, to protect Habibie's Jakarta house. These officers outnumbered the presidential guards at Habibie's house on 21 May and initially refused to leave without orders from Muchdi, but were convinced to leave on the evening of 22 May. On the afternoon of 22 May, Prabowo met with Muchdi at the state palace. Prabowo wanted more time before he and Muchdi would be transferred to non-combat positions, to create the perception that it was a normal military rotation, but Wiranto insisted on the changes being made immediately. On the morning of 23 May, Subagyo removed Muchdi from the command of Kopassus. Major-General Syahrir was sworn in as the new Kopassus chief on May 25. Muchdi was shifted to the non-combat role of deputy inspector general of TNI. On 1 March 2001, Muchdi was among 55 generals present at an Army headquarters meeting that agreed the Army should never try to seize power.

== Abductions of activists ==
From early 1997 to May 1998, Kopassus troops kidnapped 23 pro-democracy activists with the aim of intimidating opponents of Suharto's autocratic regime. One of the activists was found dead, nine were released and 13 never reappeared. Survivors said they were tortured. Responding to demands for justice after Suharto's resignation in May 1998, TNI convened an Officers Honor Council, which in August 1998 found that Prabowo and Muchdi bore responsibility for the abductions.

According to The Indonesian Army by Joseph Daves, the Officers Honor Council decided Prabowo and Muchdi should be granted immunity from civil prosecution in return for their cooperation. The two reportedly said Suharto gave verbal orders to abduct dissidents and subsequently to “finish them off”. The Officers Honor Council ruled Prabowo and Muchdi had misinterpreted Suharto's order.

Chief of the Officers Honor Council, General Subagyo Hadisiswoyo, said Prabowo and Muchdi either gave instructions for the abductions or were aware of their issuance. He said Muchdi, as Kopassus chief, must have fully understood his authority and duties. In 2008, when Muchdi was tried for orchestrating the murder of human rights activist Munir, his lawyer argued he had no connection to the abductions because he was in Kalimantan when they took place. In a 2008 interview, Muchdi said he had actually ordered the release of the remaining activists when he became Kopassus chief.

== Treason allegation ==
In March 2001, President Abdurrahman Wahid accused Forestry Ministry secretary general Suripto of meeting with Muchdi at Jakarta's Kempinski Hotel to plot treason. Police questioned Muchdi, who said he had met with Suripto only to discuss logging concessions. Suripto also denied plotting treason. He said Muchdi owns a timber company in West Kalimantan, so they had met several times at Suripto's office to discuss the timber business. Wahid was impeached and removed from office four months later.

== BIN career ==
In June 2000, detikcom online news portal speculated Muchdi had been nominated to replace Air Vice Marshal Ian Santoso as director of the Strategic Intelligence Agency (BAIS, responsible to Military Headquarters), while there was also a claim Prabowo had advised then-President Abdurrahman Wahid to appoint Muchdi as head of the State Intelligence Coordinating Agency (Bakin, responsible to the President), which was headed by Lieutenant General Arie J. Kumaat. BAKIN was in January 2001 restructured and renamed the State Intelligence Agency (BIN). After Abdurrahman Wahid was impeached in July 2001, his successor Megawati Sukarnoputri appointed Hendropriyono to lead BIN on 9 August 2001. In December 2001, Muchdi was appointed Deputy V of BIN. In March 2005, he was positioned as a BIN principal agent. In April 2003, he retired from the military and had the status of a Group 4 civil servant. On 1 January 2008, he retired as a Group 4 civil servant.

=== Terrorism investigations and infiltration ===
After the October 2002 Bali bombings that left 202 people dead, Muchdi – in his capacity as deputy head of BIN – headed a joint intelligence task force that complemented the police investigation into the terror attack. The formal separation of the Indonesian Military and Police in 1999 had compromised the intelligence capabilities of the police force, which lacked a database on radical groups. Hence, Muchdi's task force was required to provide police with military intelligence, as BIN had a database on extremists. Muchdi's group reportedly pursued suspects in Sumbawa, West Nusa Tenggara province. Two weeks after the bombings, BIN asked police to arrest seven suspects, but police were unable to make the arrests based on BIN's evidence.

The Indonesian Mujahidin Council (MMI), founded by radical cleric Abu Bakar Bashir, suspected it had been penetrated by BIN operatives. Tempo magazine in December 2002 reported a senior BIN operative, Abdul Harris, had entered MMI at its inception and served as head of its international relations division. His true identity was reportedly exposed during a meeting of Muslim leaders at a religious gathering at Muchdi's house. According to the book After Bali: The Threat of Terrorism in Southeast Asia, Muchdi introduced Harris to the Muslim leaders as a “BIN operative”.

== Munir Said Thalib murder trial and acquittal ==
In August 2008, Muchdi went on trial at South Jakarta District Court, accused of soliciting and planning the September 2004 murder of human rights activist Munir Said Thalib. The killing was perpetrated by an off-duty Garuda pilot and alleged BIN agent named Pollycarpus Budihari Priyanto. In earlier trials, Garuda chief executive Indra Setiawan testified he had met with Muchdi and received a verbal and written request from BIN to assign Pollycarpus to a flight that Munir made from Jakarta to Singapore.

Evidence showed 41 phone calls were made between Pollycarpus and Muchdi in the days surrounding the murder. Budi Santoso, a former BIN director, told police in October 2007 and May 2008 that Pollycarpus and BIN agent Kawan had told him Muchdi ordered them to kill Munir. Budi further said he had often seen Pollycarpus inside Muchdi's office at BIN headquarters. When Muchdi went on trial, Budi failed to appear as a witness. Prosecutors argued Muchdi carried a grudge against Munir, as the activist's exposure of the 1997-98 abductions had led to Muchdi losing his position as Kopassus chief. Muchdi's lawyers responded that Muchdi had lost his position because of the fall of Suharto and not because of Munir's actions. Some activists asserted Munir's assassination was masterminded by officials higher than Muchdi.

Soldiers, intelligence officials and thugs were present during Muchdi's trial, prompting complaints it was an effort to intimidate judges, prosecutors and witnesses. Some witnesses failed to appear, and others who had previously provided incriminating statements to police withdrew them at trial. Tensions were evident at the trial when Munir's widow Suciwati urged Muchdi to tell the truth. He responded by snapping at her, “Shut up, you!” before he exited.

Muchdi was acquitted on December 31, 2008. In June 2009, the Supreme Court rejected an appeal. Indonesia's National Commission on Human Rights (Komnas HAM) said the investigation, prosecution and trial of Muchdi were flawed, and recommended a new police investigation. President Joko Widodo promised to resolve the case but there has been no follow-up.

Prior to his acquittal, Muchdi said those who pushed for his trial are the "henchmen of foreign imperialism", trying to destabilize Indonesia's national resilience. He claimed their long-term goal is to weaken Indonesia's justice, political, economic and religious institutions. He said Dutch agencies that investigated the murder of Munir cannot be trusted because the Dutch previously colonized Indonesia and committed human rights violations. He said the only state institution in Indonesia that had not been infiltrated by foreign interests was the judiciary.

After Muchdi's acquittal, three floral congratulatory boards were delivered to his South Jakarta residence. All three were from PT Bayu Buana Gemilang, a natural gas trading company where his son and daughter work. Muchdi celebrated his acquittal by treating 40 orphans to a thanksgiving dinner at his house in Kebayoran Baru neighborhood. Commenting on the verdict, he said, "This is a gift for the nation of Indonesia."

In 2016, Muchdi said Indonesian human rights campaigners still calling for Munir's case to be resolved were merely exploiting the case in order to gain funds from the Netherlands.

== Political career ==
In 2008, Muchdi joined Prabowo's newly formed Gerindra Party and served as deputy chairman. He became “non-active” in the party pending his murder trial but resumed his position after being acquitted at the end of 2008.

In June 2010, Muchdi attempted to become Central Executive of Indonesia's second-largest Muslim organization, Muhammadiyah, even though he did not meet the requirement of being a member for at least six years.

In February 2011, Muchdi quit Gerindra and joined the Islam-based United Development Party (PPP), saying "only PPP is still purely Islamic today”. He declined to explicitly explain his reason for leaving, but Gerindra member Desmon Junaidi Mahesa said Muchdi's move to PPP was an effort to raise support for Prabowo in the 2014 presidential election. In March 2011, Muchdi declared he would run for the leadership of PPP, despite having joined the party only a month earlier. He claimed that as an Islamic activist, he wanted to reverse PPP's declining popularity in elections.

In May 2011, Muchdi was elected head of the Daily Regional Leadership Council (DPW) of PPP for Papua province for the period 2011–2015. Party officials in the province hoped his leadership would mobilize Papuans to vote for PPP in future general elections. However, PPP officials in Jakarta rejected Muchdi's election as illegal, claiming the voting process was legally flawed. Muchdi responded by filing a police complaint against four senior PPP members, accusing them of slander and defamation. In June 2011, when PPP held a congress in the West Java capital of Bandung to elect a new leader, Muchdi withdrew from the race, saying he was ineligible to stand for the position.

In January 2012, it was reported Muchdi had joined the National Republic Party (Nasrep) of former president Suharto's youngest son, Hutomo Mandala Putra, better known as Tommy Suharto. Muchdi served as a member of the party's advisory council and officials hoped he would strengthen the party's political machinery.

In 2016, when Nasrep merged with another small party, Beringin Karya Party, to form Berkarya Party as a political vehicle for Tommy Suharto, Muchdi was appointed chairman of the party's Honorary Board. In March 2018, Muchdi said he was not bothered by the “small matter” of efforts to link him to Munir's murder, as he had already been found not guilty, so the case was resolved. He said the accusations would actually strengthen Berkarya because of his innocence. He claimed to be unaware Munir's murderer Pollycarpus Priyanto had also joined the party.

Berkarya in 2018 announced it was supporting Prabowo Subianto's candidacy for Indonesia's 2019 presidential election. Muchdi in February 2019 announced he was instead supporting President Joko Widodo's bid for re-election. He said Jokowi, in his first term in office, had achieved more than any other president in Indonesia's reform period, improving roads, ports, airports and industry. Mucdhi said he did not think his friend Prabowo could make such achievements in five years. Berkarya's organizational wing, Laskar Berkarya, demanded that Tommy Suharto immediately dismiss Muchdi from the party, describing his endorsement of Jokowi as an act of betrayal. The reformist Indonesian Solidarity Party (PSI), which supports Jokowi, questioned whether Muchdi was seeking to act as "a destructive Trojan horse from within" or merely looking to create a sensation. PSI official Surya Tjandra said Muchdi's support would not increase Jokowi's electability.

Muchdi's Berkarya faction, called the Presidium of Party Rescuers, on 11 July 2020 held an Extraordinary National Conference (Munaslub), which named Muchdi as chairman of Berkarya. Tommy's faction rejected the Munaslub and said Muchdi and his followers had been dismissed from the party. The Justice and Human Rights Ministry on 30 July 2020 issued decrees recognizing Muchdi's changes to the party's leadership structure.

== Business activities ==
Muchdi is commissioner of Suryatama Cemerlang Abadi (SCA), a company that produces bottled water branded as Suli 5. The company has at least nine factories in Indonesia and is majority-owned by Muhammadiyah.

Muchdi is the commissioner of PT. Rizki Kacida Reana, a forestry firm that was founded in 2000 and operates a concession of 55,150 hectares in East Kalimantan and North Kalimantan.

Muchdi was in 2014-15 involved in a legal dispute with PT Internasional Islamic Boarding School over the ownership of company shares worth Rp10 billion.

In May 2015, Suharto's eldest daughter Siti Hardiyanti ‘Tutut’ Rukmana appointed Muchdi as chief commissioner of her television network PT Citra Televisi Pendidikan Indonesia (TPI), which was embroiled in an ownership dispute with tycoon Hary Tanoesoedibjo.

In December 2016, Muchdi was present for the inauguration of two associations that planned to resume sand mining and exports from Riau Islands province. The government had banned sand exports in 2007 because of environmental concerns, but the associations said exports of abundant sea sand would benefit the public.

== Other activities ==
- Harley Davison Club Indonesia: Muchdi is a prominent member of the Harley Davidson Club Indonesia (HDCI). His son Raditya Muhas shares his passion for motorbikes and is a founder of the Brawijaya Riders motorcycle community.
- Indonesian Pencak Silat Association: From 2007 to 2011, Muchdi was daily chairman of the executive board of the Indonesian Pencak Silat Association (IPSI), the official body of the traditional martial art. In 2009, Muchdi was highly critical of the inauguration ceremony for the regional board of IPSI in Batam, Riau Islands province. He said the room was too large, the stage too high, and there were no performers able to recite the Quran.
- Tapak Suci: Muchdi is chairman of the Central Leadership of Tapak Suci Putera Muhammadiyah, a self-defense martial art organization of the Muhammadiyah Muslim group. In 2008, when on trial for soliciting the murder of Munir, Muchdi told the court, “I am a great warrior of Tapak Suci, a warrior who can fight alone, especially to face one person.” Among his supporters cheering him at the trial were members of Tapak Suci.
- ASGA Indonesia: Muchdi is president of the Asian Senior Golf Association - Indonesia.
- Muhammadiyah scouts: Muchdi is chairman of the Central Headquarters of the Muhammadiyah Scouting Movement Hizbul Wathan for the 2016-21 period. He said he would focus on using the Hizbul Wathan scouts to fight against the circulation of illegal drugs.

== Personal life ==
Muchdi is married to Puji Astuti and they have three children: Dewi Kirana Juvirawati, Raditya Muhas Juvirawan and Dias Baskara Dewantara. In November 2014, Dias married Allida Alexandra ‘Andra’ Nurluthvia, the third daughter of racing driver Alex Asmasoebrata. Their wedding reception at Jakarta's Shangri-La Hotel reportedly cost Rp5 billion. Alex said he was proud to be connected to Muchdi because he considers him a true patriot who is reputed to have assisted orphans and Islamic boarding schools. He said he hoped the wedding would bring Andra closer to God and result in her wearing a Muslim headscarf. Andra and Dias were divorced by 2017, and Andra married a nephew of Vice President Jusuf Kalla in January 2018.
