= Tarakan Regional House of Representatives =

Legislative body of Tarakan

Tarakan Regional House of Representatives Dewan Perwakilan Rakyat Daerah Kota Tarakan

Type
- Type: Unicameral

History
- New session started: 12 August 2019

Structure
- Seats: 30
- Political groups: PKB (4) Gerindra (4) PDIP (3) Golkar (4) NasDem (4) PPP (1) PKS (2) PAN (1) Demokrat (1) Hanura (4) Berkarya (1) Perindo (1)

Elections
- Voting system: Open list

The Tarakan Regional House of Representatives (Indonesian: Dewan Perwakilan Rakyat Daerah Kota Tarakan, lit. 'Tarakan City Regional People's Representative Council') is the legislative body of Tarakan, a city in the Indonesian province of North Kalimantan. As of 2019, it had 30 representatives from 12 political parties.
