= Titiek =

Titiek is a feminine given name. Notable people with the name include:

- Titiek Puspa (1937–2025), stage name of Sudarwati, Indonesian singer and songwriter
- Titiek Suharto (born 1959), Indonesian businesswoman and politician
