= Fourth Commission of the House of Representatives of Indonesia =

Fourth Commission of the House of Representatives
- Komisi IV Dewan Perwakilan Rakyat Republik Indonesia
- Coat of arms of the House of Representatives of Indonesia
- Chairperson: Siti Hediati Hariyadi
- Vice Chairperson: Alex Indra Lukman; Panggah Susanto; Abdul Kharis Almasyhari; Ahmad Yohan
- Parent organization: House of Representatives

Fourth Commission of the House of Representatives (Indonesian: Komisi IV Dewan Perwakilan Rakyat Republik Indonesia), more commonly known as Fourth Commission (Komisi IV), is one of thirteen commissions for the 2024-2029 period, within the House of Representatives of Indonesia. The commission has the scope of tasks in the fields of agriculture, the environment, forestry, and marine affairs.

== Legal basis ==
1. Law of the Republic of Indonesia Number 17 of 2014 concerning the People's Consultative Assembly, the People's Representative Council, the Regional Representative Council, and the Regional People's Representative Council.
2. Law of the Republic of Indonesia Number 42 of 2014 concerning Amendments to Law Number 17 of 2014 concerning the People's Consultative Assembly, People's Representative Council, Regional Representative Council, and Regional People's Representative Council.
3. Law of the Republic of Indonesia Number 2 of 2018 concerning the Second Amendment to Law Number 17 of 2014 concerning the People's Consultative Assembly, the People's Representative Council, the Regional Representative Council, and the Regional People's Representative Council.
4. Regulation of the House of Representatives of the Republic of Indonesia Number 1 of 2014 concerning Rules of Conduct.
5. Regulation of the House of Representatives of the Republic of Indonesia Number 3 of 2015 concerning Amendments to the Regulation of the House of Representatives of the Republic of Indonesia Number 1 of 2014 concerning the Rules of Conduct.

== Working partners ==
Based on the Decree of the House of Representatives of the Republic of Indonesia for the 2024-2029 period, the Working Partners of the Fourth Commission are as follows:

- Ministry of Agriculture
- Ministry of Forestry
- Ministry of Marine Affairs and Fisheries
- Bulog
- Peat and Mangrove Restoration Agency
- National Food Agency
- Indonesian Quarantine Agency

== Membership ==
=== Leadership for 2024-2029 ===
Name	Title	Party
Siti Hediati Soeharto	Chairman	Great Indonesia Movement Party
Alex Indra Lukman	Vice Chairman	Indonesian Democratic Party of Struggle
Panggah Susanto	Vice Chairman	Golkar
Abdul Kharis Almasyhari	Vice Chairman	Prosperous Justice Party
Ahmad Yohan	Vice Chairman	National Mandate Party

=== Members for 2024-2029 ===
Name	Title	Party	Electoral district
Siti Hediati Soeharto	Chairman	Great Indonesia Movement Party	Yogyakarta
Alex Indra Lukman	Vice Chairman	Indonesian Democratic Party of Struggle	West Sumatera I
Panggah Susanto	Vice Chairman	Golkar	Central Java VI
Abdul Kharis Almasyhari	Vice Chairman	Prosperous Justice Party	Central Java V
Ahmad Yohan	Vice Chairman	National Mandate Party	East Nusa Tenggara I
Sonny T. Danaparamita	Group Faction Leader	Indonesian Democratic Party of Struggle	East Java III
Sulaeman L. Hamzah	Group Faction Leader	NasDem Party	South Papua
Jaelani	Group Faction Leader	National Awakening Party	Southeast Sulawesi
Bambang Purwanto	Group Faction Leader	Democratic Party	Central Kalimantan
Slamet	Group Faction Leader	Prosperous Justice Party	West Java IV
Herry Dermawan	Group Faction Leader	National Mandate Party	West Java X
Darori Wonodipuro	Group Faction Leader	Great Indonesia Movement Party	Central Java VII
Sturman Panjaitan	Member	Indonesian Democratic Party of Struggle	Riau Islands
Rokhmin Dahuri	Member	Indonesian Democratic Party of Struggle	West Java VIII
I Nyoman Adi Wiryatama	Member	Indonesian Democratic Party of Struggle	Bali
Paolus Hadi	Member	Indonesian Democratic Party of Struggle	West Kalimantan II
Agus Ambo Djiwa	Member	Indonesian Democratic Party of Struggle	West Sulawesi
I Ketut Suwendra	Member	Indonesian Democratic Party of Struggle	Lampung II
Edoardus Kaize	Member	Indonesian Democratic Party of Struggle	South Papua
Robert Joppy Kardinal	Member	Golkar	Southwest Papua
Hanan A. Rozak	Member	Golkar	Lampung II
Adrianus Asia Sidot	Member	Golkar	West Kalimantan II
Eko Wahyudi	Member	Golkar	East Java IX
Firman Soebagyo	Member	Golkar	Central Java III
Alien Mus	Member	Golkar	North Maluku
Dadang M. Naser	Member	Golkar	West Java II
Teuku Abdul Khalid	Member	Great Indonesia Movement Party	Aceh II
Kartika Sandra Desi	Member	Great Indonesia Movement Party	South Sumatera I
Dwita Ria Gunadi	Member	Great Indonesia Movement Party	Lampung II
Endang Setyawati Thohari	Member	Great Indonesia Movement Party	West Jawa III
Azikin Sultan	Member	Great Indonesia Movement Party	South Sulawesi I
Ananda Tohpati	Member	NasDem Party	West Java III
Arif Rahman	Member	NasDem Party	Banten I
Cindy Monica Salsabila Setiawan	Member	NasDem Party	West Sumatera II
Rajiv	Member	NasDem Party	West Java II
Daniel Johan	Member	National Awakening Party	West Kalimantan I
Hindun Anisah	Member	National Awakening Party	Central Java II
Usman Husin	Member	National Awakening Party	East Nusa Tenggara II
Rina Sa'adah	Member	National Awakening Party	West Java X
Guntur Sasono	Member	Democratic Party	East Java VIII
Ellen Esther Pelealu	Member	Democratic Party	Central Sulawesi
Hasan Saleh	Member	Democratic Party	North Kalimantan
Johan Rosihan	Member	Prosperous Justice Party	West Nusa Tenggara I
Saadiah Uluputty	Member	Prosperous Justice Party	Maluku
Riyono	Member	Prosperous Justice Party	East Java VII
Ajbar	Member	National Mandate Party	Lampung II
Irham Jafar Lan Putra	Member	National Mandate Party	Lampung II
