= Pollycarpus Priyanto =

Indonesian convicted of murdering a human rights activist

Pollycarpus Budihari Priyanto
- Born: 26 January 1961; Surakarta, Indonesia
- Died: 17 October 2020 (aged 59); Jakarta, Indonesia
- Spouse: Yosepha Hera Iswandari
- Children: 3
- Criminal charges: Murder, forging documents
- Penalty: 20 years, paroled in 2014

Pollycarpus Budihari Priyanto (26 January 1961 – 17 October 2020) was an Indonesian pilot for Garuda Indonesia airline and an alleged agent of Indonesia's State Intelligence Agency (BIN). He was involved in the murder of human rights activist Munir Said Thalib with arsenic on 7 September 2004.

== Munir assassination case ==
In July 2004 at Jakarta's Sahid Jaya Hotel, Pollycarpus gave Garuda's then-chief executive officer Indra Setiawan a letter from BIN deputy chairman M. As'ad. The letter instructed Indra to place Pollycarpus in Garuda's corporate security sector. Consequently, on 11 August 2004, Indra wrote a letter addressed to Pollycarpus and copied to Garuda's then-vice president for corporate security, Ramelgia Anwar, assigning Pollycarpus to assist in corporate security. Pollycarpus had initially been scheduled to fly to Beijing, China, on 6 September 2004, but after receiving the letter of assignment, he changed his schedule so that he could join Garuda flight GA-974 that Munir would be taking from Jakarta to Amsterdam via Singapore on 7 September.

During the Garuda flight's stopover in Singapore, Pollycarpus administered a lethal dose of arsenic to Munir, causing the activist to die on the Singapore-Amsterdam leg of the flight.

Indra's lawyer Wira D. Dipodiputra said the letter from BIN concerning Pollycarpus was later stolen from Indra's car in December 2004 at Sahid Jaya Hotel.

In the days surrounding the murder of Munir, 41 calls were made between Pollycarpus and the mobile phone of BIN deputy chief Muchdi Purwopranjono. Witnesses stated they had seen Pollycarpus at Muchdi's office prior to the murder, although their statements were revoked when they declined to testify at Muchdi's trial. Indra admitted to having twice met BIN deputy Muchdi after the murder; first in October or November 2004 when Indra went to BIN's office to ask about the assignment letter for Pollycarpus, and then on 3 March 2005, when Indra was summoned to a meeting at Jakarta's Hotel Mulia to discuss the answers Garuda officials would give when questioned by legislators about the murder.

Pollycarpus was declared a suspect on 19 March 2005. He went on trial on 8 August 2005 at Central Jakarta District Court. In December 2005, he was found guilty and sentenced to 14 years' imprisonment. In October 2006, his conviction was annulled by a three-member panel of judges at the Supreme Court, citing insufficient evidence, however he was given a two-year jail term for document forgery. The judges who overturned his murder conviction were Iskandar Kamil and Atja Sondjaya, while Artidjo Alkostar issued a dissenting opinion.

Pollycarpus was released on 26 December 2006, after receiving a one-month reduction on his sentence – less than the time remaining to serve – as part of a holiday amnesty.

On 25 January 2007, the Attorney General's Office filed for a judicial review of the case. The Supreme Court re-opened the case and on 24 January 2008 sentenced Pollycarpus to 20 years' jail for the murder of Munir.

Pollycarpus filed for a judicial review of his tougher sentencing. On 2 October 2013, the Supreme Court responded by cutting his sentence from 20 years to 14 years. The panel of Supreme Court justices who cut his sentence comprised Sofyan Sitompul, Dudu D. Machmudin, Sri Murwahyuni, Salman Luthan, M Zaharuddin Utama and Amin Safrudin.

Taking into account his time already served, Pollycarpus was due for release in 2022, but the government gave him total sentence cuts of 50 months, making him eligible for parole in 2014. In November 2014, Pollycarpus was released from prison on parole. He completed his parole term on 29 August 2018 and was declared completely free.

== Political career ==
In March 2018, it was announced Pollycarpus had become a member of Tommy Suharto's Berkarya Party.

== Death ==
On 1 October 2020, Pollycarpus was admitted to Jakarta's Pertamina Central Hospital, where he received treatment for COVID-19 during the COVID-19 pandemic in Indonesia for 17 days. He died at the hospital on the afternoon of 17 October 2020. He was buried the following morning at Pondok Rangon Public Cemetery in East Jakarta.

Human rights activist Usman Hamid of Amnesty International called for an investigation into the exact circumstances of the death, because Pollycarpus "possessed a lot of vital information that could have led to further investigations".

== Family ==
Pollycarpus was born Budihari Priyanto to Budi Santoso, a paranormal, and Hian Tan.

Pollycarpus was married to Yosepha Hera Iswandari and they had three children: Mega, Gad and Ruth.
