= Berkarya Party =

Political party in Indonesia

Berkarya Party Partai Beringin Karya
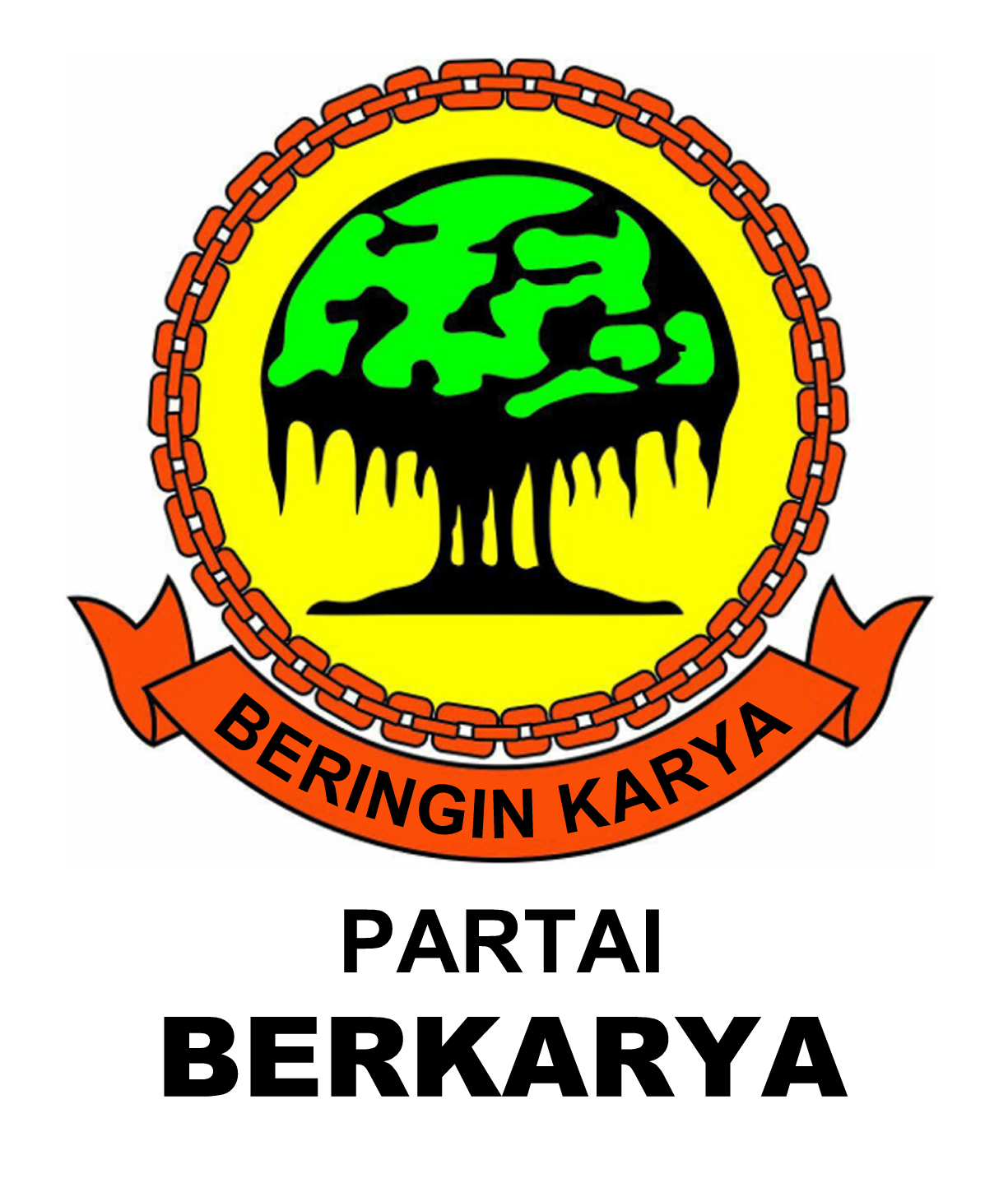
- Chairman of the Party High Assembly and Board of Trustees: Muchdi Purwopranjono (currently); Tommy Suharto (currently) (claims); Neneng A. Tuty (former)
- General Chairman: Muhammad Ridwan Andreas
- Secretary-General: Fauzan Rachmansyah
- Chairman of Honorary Board: Muchdi Purwopranjono
- Founded: 16 July 2016; 10 years ago
- Split from: Golkar
- Headquarters: Jakarta
- Youth wing: AMPB (Berkarya Party Young Force); GMB (Berkarya Young Movement); Laskar Berkarya (Berkarya Army)
- Women's wing: Srikandi Partai Berkarya
- Ideology: Pancasila; Anti-communism; National conservatism; Suhartoism; New Order revivalism; Right-wing populism; Ultranationalism
- Political position: Right-wing to far-right
- National affiliation: Advanced Indonesia Coalition (since 2024); Onward Indonesia Coalition (2020–2024); Just and Prosperous Indonesia Coalition (2018–2019)
- DPR seats: 0 / 580
- DPRD I seats: 0 / 2,372
- DPRD II seats: 0 / 17,510

Website
- www.berkarya.id

The Berkarya Party (acronym for Beringin Karya, lit. 'Party of Functional Banyan') is an Indonesian political party formed in 2016. The party was formed to channel the political aspirations of former president Suharto's youngest son, Hutomo Mandala Putra, better known as Tommy Suharto. Tommy, a convicted murderer by proxy, lost the general chairmanship of the party in July 2020 after the government recognized the leadership of a breakaway faction headed by former general Muchdi Purwopranjono. Berkarya came 11th out of 16 political parties that contested Indonesia's 2019 general election, receiving 2.09% of votes cast. The party supported Tommy's former brother-in-law Prabowo Subianto's unsuccessful bid for the presidency in 2019. After failing to win a 4% threshold necessary to gain seats in the national parliament, the party in 2020 split into rival factions: one led by Tommy and the government-recognized faction led by Muchdi.

== Background ==
Tommy Suharto in 2009 contested the leadership of Golkar Party, his father's former political vehicle, but failed to win any votes. In 2016, it was announced that Tommy would again contest the Golkar leadership but he did not enter the race. Instead, he joined the newly formed Berkarya Party.

Berkarya is an amalgamation of Beringin Karya Party and National Republic (Nasrep) Party. It was established on 15 July 2016 to coincide with Tommy's birthday, and was recognized by the government as a legitimate political party on 17 October 2016.

Controversially, Berkarya Party uses Golkar's distinctive banyan tree logo and yellow color. Berkarya's founding chairwoman Neneng A. Tuty said these similarities were coincidental and not an effort to imitate Golkar.

In 2017, Berkarya announced it would nominate Tommy for the presidency for the 2019-2023 period "to restore Indonesia's glory, such as food self-sufficiency, development and creating justice in the country". Tommy's lawyer subsequently denied his client would be standing for election.

=== Eligibility for 2019 election ===
On 13 October 2017, Berkarya registered with the General Elections Commission (KPU) to compete in the 2019 general election. Berkarya claimed to have established its presence in all 34 Indonesian provinces and 514 regencies, in line with verification requirements for parties seeking to contest the 2019 election. On 14 December 2017, the KPU ruled that Berkarya was ineligible to contest the election because data submitted by the party concerning its membership in the regions was invalid. Berkarya filed an objection with the General Election Supervisory Agency (Bawaslu), insisting the party had met all membership requirements. KPU and Bawaslu officials later met with Berkarya treasurer Raden Mas Hendryanto. KPU member Hasyim Asy’ari on 4 January 2018 said the meeting determined Berkarya had met the requirements for verification at the central level. On 17 February 2018, KPU announced Berkarya was among 14 parties (later revised to 16 parties) eligible for the 2019 elections. The following day, when parties drew numbers to determine the order they would appear on ballot sheets, Berkarya drew number 7. Then-chairwoman Neneng A. Tuty said number 7 is lucky and she hoped it would help the party to victory. According to KPU data, Berkarya is present in 486 regencies and has 409,022 members, of whom 36.36% are women. After the party's qualification, all of Suharto's children joined Berkarya Party.

== Plans and policies ==
Berkarya’s website states the party aims to fight for the people's aspirations and interests in every political and government decision and policy.

In February 2018, Tommy said if the party wins legislative seats in 2019, it would direct the government to better control state and regional budgets so programs favor the "small people, not just a handful of people". In March 2018, he said Berkarya would intensively approach politicians from other parties to join Berkarya.

Berkarya hoped to be ranked among the top three parties in 2019 by capitalizing on nostalgia for the Suharto era. Neneng in 2017 said Berkarya could be among the top two vote-winners in 2019 because many leaders want to join the party, while many people miss the prosperity of the Suharto era. In February 2018, party secretary general Badaruddin Andi Picunang said Berkarya is targeting 78 seats in the 2019 election, amounting to 13.7% of votes.

Berkarya in 2017 inaugurated a party wing called Perisai (meaning ‘Shield’, an acronym from Patriot Organisasi Pagar Negeri or National Fence Patriot Organization). Perisai Chairman Tri Joko Susilo said the organization aims to guard Tommy and the party’s agenda, and protect Indonesia from poverty, disintegration and global challenges. The organization would seek to improve commodity distribution chains to redress imbalances that presently favor middlemen over farmers. Perisai plans to gradually build warehouses or transit points for agricultural products, plantation products and fishermen's produce, so that middlemen will no longer exploit producers. Tri Joko said Perisai will help to restore Indonesia’s glory in food self-sufficiency by promoting the use of organic fertilizers to improve soil quality and yields.

=== Education policy: no school, books or uniforms ===
On 10 March 2018, Tommy outlined Berkarya’s education policy. He said Berkarya would introduce learning without going to school, as children could stay at home and learn through the internet. He said this system would save trillions of rupiah, as students would no longer need books or uniforms. He said smart cards could be used to pay for discounted tuition, while exams could take place in a single location. He said money saved on education spending could instead be spent on the people's economy.

=== Spending and infrastructure ===
Tommy has criticized President Joko Widodo’s administration for its intensive spending on infrastructure development. He said there should be a correction so that “village funds” are spent on people’s welfare programs. He also said state debt needs to be resolved soon lest it burden future generations.

=== Indirect elections of governors ===
Tommy in March 2018 said provincial governors should be appointed by the president from a list of nominees submitted by provincial legislative assemblies, rather than being directly elected by the people.

== Presidential candidate ==
In order to field a candidate in the 2019 presidential election, political parties needed at least 20% of the seats in parliament, or at least 25% of the popular vote, or they could form a coalition to come up with the requisite numbers.

In September 2017, when asked if he would run for presidency, Tommy said he was yet to think that far ahead, as he was focused on the party's verification. On 5 October 2017, Tommy's lawyer Erwin Kallo denied his client would be contesting the 2019 presidential election. He said Tommy did not wish to be actively involved in practical politics, adding that some "fake accounts" on social media claimed mass organizations had met with Tommy and endorsed him to run. In March 2018, Berkarya secretary general Badaruddin Andi Picunang said all members of the party want Tommy as their presidential candidate, although he acknowledged it may be difficult for a new party to field its own candidate, so the selection would be determined at a national leadership meeting.

While Berkarya officials want Tommy as a presidential candidate, he may be ineligible to run for the nation's highest office. Under Indonesian Law No. 7 of 2017 on Elections, presidential candidates must not have been involved in corruption or any other serious criminal activity; must never have been involved in any despicable act; and must never have been sentenced to jail for more than five years. Tommy was in September 2000 convicted of corruption and sentenced to 18 months in jail by Supreme Court justice Syafiuddin Kartasasmita. Tommy went into hiding and paid two hitmen to murder Kartasasmita. The Supreme Court responded by overturning Tommy's corruption conviction. Tommy was in 2002 sentenced to 15 years in jail for murder, fleeing justice and possession of weapons and explosives. He was released on parole in 2006.

In August 2018, Berkarya joined a group of parties supporting Prabowo Subianto's candidacy for the 2019 presidential election.

In February 2019, senior Berkarya official Muchdi Purwopranjono announced his support for incumbent President Joko "Jokowi" Widodo, defying the party's endorsement of Prabowo. Party executives rejected internal calls for Muchdi to be dismissed, saying his support for Jokowi was a personal matter.

== Leadership ==
Tommy is chairman of the Party High Assembly and Board of Trustees. The party’s first chairperson was Neneng A. Tuty, a former boxing promoter who also led Nasrep Party and the right-wing nationalist militia group Laskar Merah Putih. On 11 March 2018, Neneng announced she was handing over the leadership of the party to Tommy.

Former Coordinating Minister for Political, Legal and Security Affairs, Rear Admiral Tedjo Purdijatno, is chairman of the party’s Advisory Council. Former Army Special Forces (Kopassus) chief and former State Intelligence Agency deputy chief Muchdi Purwopranjono is chairman of the party's Honorary Board. Former National Military Police chief and former intelligence chief of the Attorney General's Office, Syamsu Djalal, is chairman of the Advisory Board.

Veteran Golkar politician Priyo Budi Santoso in March 2018 accepted Tommy's invitation to join Berkarya as secretary general. He was formally installed as secretary general on 6 April, replacing Badaruddin Andi Picunang. Tommy's lawyer Elza Syarief and motivational speaker Mario Teguh were also reported to be joining Berkarya. The party in April 2018 said Mario had decided not to join but would instead play a behind-the-scenes role, whereas his wife, Linna Teguh, would join the party.

In June 2018, Tommy's sister Siti Hediati 'Titiek' Haryadi resigned from Golkar Party and joined Berkarya. Titiek, who ran for parliament in 2019 on Berkarya's ticket, complained her voice had never been heard in Golkar. Priyo Budi Santoso said Titiek would serve as chairwoman of Berkarya's Advisory Council and also as coordinator of the party's electoral commands.

Berkarya experienced its first internal conflict in July 2017 when Central Leadership Board executive Nurul Candrasari, a former Golkar official, was dismissed from her position. She responded by reporting Neneng and Badaruddin to police over her "illegal" dismissal.

=== 2020 split, pro-Muchdi faction ===
In 2020, a rift developed in Berkarya between Tommy's loyalists and supporters of Muchdi. Muchdi's faction, calling itself the Presidium of Party Rescuers, on 11 July 2020 held an Extraordinary National Conference (Munaslub), which named Muchdi as chairman of Berkarya and Badaruddin Andi Picunang as secretary general. Tommy's faction rejected the results of the Munaslub and dismissed Muchdi and his followers from the party.

The Justice and Human Rights Ministry on 30 July 2020 issued two decrees ratifying changes made by the Muchdi faction to Berkarya's management, statutes and bylaws. The decrees effectively grant Muchdi control of the party. Berkarya secretary general Priyo Budi Santoso said Tommy would seek clarification from Justice and Human Rights Minister Yasonna Laoly. Priyo said the issuance of the decrees was absurd and a disgrace to democracy because Muchdi's national meeting was illegal and most of the party's provincial chapters remained loyal to Tommy. Tommy on 14 August 2020 said his party had filed a civil case with the State Administrative Court, aimed at having the Justice Ministry's two decrees revoked. He also said criminal reports would be filed over the breakaway faction.

Badaruddin Andi Picunang claimed Muchdi's national conference was held at the request of two-thirds of Berkarya's provincial and central officials. He said the party needed professional and democratic management, which was lacking under Tommy. He claimed Tommy had been inactive and not responsive to the party's needs. After the Muchdi faction was endorsed by the Justice Ministry, Badaruddin said Berkarya had automatically annulled all of its recommendations for candidates in regional elections throughout Indonesia.

On 15 August 2020, Yudi Relawanto, the secretary of Muchdi's Munaslub, cast doubt on the legitimacy of the conference, saying some of the participants were "ghosts" - meaning the number of actual attendees was not as many as those listed. He said he only joined the conference because he thought its aim was an evaluation, and not an attempt to change the party leadership.

On 5 February 2021, Priyo Budi Santoso, the secretary general of the pro-Tommy faction of Berkarya, claimed Justice and Human Rights Minister Yasonna Laoly was willing to acknowledge Tommy as the legitimate leader of the party. He complained that Badaruddin Andi Picunang had engineered the split in Berkarya even though 32 of the party's provincial chapters remained loyal to Tommy.

On 16 February 2021, Jakarta State Administrative Court ruled that the two decrees issued by the Minister of Justice and Human Rights recognizing Muchdi's leadership of Berkarya were void, and ruled the minister was obliged to revoke the decrees. Muchdi said he would appeal the court's decision and urged his followers to remain solid until there is a ruling with permanent legal force.

=== Central Leadership Board ===
- Party High Assembly Chairman: Hutomo Mandala Putra
- Advisory Council Chairman: Rear Admiral Tedjo Purdijatno
- Honorary Board Chairman: Muchdi Purwopranjono
- Advisory Board Chairman: Syamsu Djalal
- Board of Trustees Chairman: Hutomo Mandala Putra
- Experts Council Chairman: Ghozi Wahib Wahab

=== Board of Executives ===
- Chairman: Tommy Suharto
- Deputy Chairpersons: Yockie M. Hutagalung, Bambang Ibnu Hartomo, Soni Puji Sasono, Tintin Hendrayani, Muhammad Amin Luther, Ourida Seskania.
- Daily Affairs Chief: Achmad Goesra
- Secretary General: Priyo Budi Santoso
- General Treasurer: Raden Mas Hendryanto

== Leaders ==
- Neneng A. Tuty (2016–2018)
- Tommy Suharto (2018–2020)
- Muchdi Purwopranjono (2020–2025)
- Muhammad Ridwan Andreas (Incumbent)

== Election results ==
=== Legislative election results ===
Election	Ballot number	Leader	Seats		Votes		Status
Election	Ballot number	Leader	No.	±	Total	%	Status
2019	7	Tommy Suharto	0 / 575		2,929,495	2.09%	Opposition
2024	Did not qualify						

=== Presidential election results ===
Election	Ballot number	Candidate	Running mate	1st round (Total votes)	Share of votes	Outcome	2nd round (Total votes)	Share of votes	Outcome
2019	02	Prabowo Subianto	Sandiaga Uno	68,650,239	44.50%	Lost			

== Controversies ==
Berkarya secretary general Badaruddin Andi Picunang in March 2018 confirmed convicted murderer Pollycarpus Budihari Priyanto had joined the party. He said Pollycarpus, who served eight years of a 14-year jail sentence for the 2004 murder of human rights activist Munir Said Thalib, has the same political rights as any citizen. He said Pollycarpus may feel Berkarya Party is the best match for channeling his political aspirations. He denied the presence of Pollycarpus and former state intelligence deputy chief Muchdi Purwopranjono would tarnish the party's image. "We do not want to look at the backgrounds of people. What's important is being a member," he said. Tommy also defended the decision to have a convicted murderer in his party. “I think the problem is a matter of the past. If indeed a person has been sentenced, [and] served his punishment, then in accordance with the Constitutional Court’s decision, the person shall have the same status as an ordinary civilian again,” he said on the sidelines of Berkarya’s National Leadership Meeting in Solo, Central Java, on 11 March 2018. Similarly, Muchdi said Pollycarpus has the right to join any party and stand for election.

In January 2018, the chairman of the Regional Leadership Council (DPW) of Berkarya's South Kalimantan chapter, Abdul Latif, was arrested by the Corruption Eradication Commission (KPK) for allegedly accepting a Rp1 billion bribe related to a hospital project. Abdul is the head of Central Hulu Sungai regency and had quit Golkar Party in order to join Berkarya. Badaruddin said Berkarya would provide Abdul with legal aid and ensure he does not get dismissed from his position in the party. In August 2018, prosecutors at Central Jakarta Corruption Court recommended Abdul be sentenced to eight years in jail. On 20 September 2018, he was found guilty of accepting bribes of Rp3.6 billion and sentenced to six years in jail.

On 28 September 2019, police arrested Berkarya legislative candidate Sony Santoso, a retired Navy first admiral, on suspicion of leading a plot to detonate bombs in Jakarta's Chinatown district on the same day. Sony's neighbors in Tangerang expressed doubt over his alleged involvement, saying he liked to sing karaoke and had even spoken at a local mosque. Sony had run unsuccessfully for parliament in the April 2019 general election.
