= Daniel Johan =

Indonesian politician (born 1972)

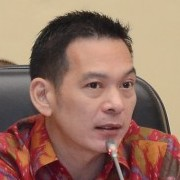
Daniel Johan

Daniel Johan (born 10 April 1972) is a politician from Indonesia. He was elected as a member of the House of Representatives for 2019 to 2024 from the National Awakening Party. He served as Deputy Chair of Fourth Commission of the House of Representatives.
