= Suciwati =

Indonesian human rights activist (born 1968)

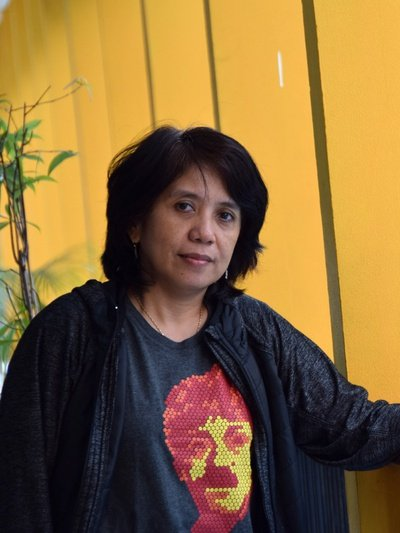
- Suciwati in 2019
- Born: 28 December 1968 (age 57); Malang, Indonesia
- Spouse: Munir Said Thalib
- Children: Soultan Alif Allende; Diva Suukyi Larasati

Suciwati (born 28 December 1968) is an Indonesian human rights activist who continues the activities of her late husband, Munir Said Thalib, the Right Livelihood Award-winning human rights activist after he was murdered on board of a Garuda Indonesia flight, when he was about to undertake his International Law studies in Utrecht. She is also the founder of the Indonesian museum Omah Munir, founded in 2013, and the campaign titled "Menolak Lupa" or "Refuse to Forget", which is intended to persuade people not to forgot what her husband, Munir, has done for Indonesia.
