= Didit Hediprasetyo =

Indonesian fashion designer and socialite (born 1984)

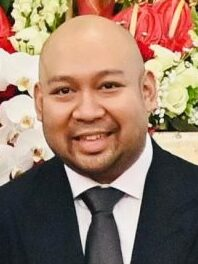
- Didit Hediprasetyo, 2024
- Born: Ragowo Hediprasetyo Djojohadikusumo; 22 March 1984 (age 42); Jakarta, Indonesia
- Education: Parsons School of Design; (Parsons Paris)
- Occupation: Fashion designer
- Known for: Son of Prabowo Subianto
- Parents: Prabowo Subianto (father); Titiek Suharto (mother)
- Relatives: Hashim Djojohadikusumo (paternal uncle); Sudradjad Djiwandono (uncle-in-law); Sumitro Djojohadikusumo (paternal grandfather); Suharto (maternal grandfather)
- Awards: Silver Thimble Award
- Website: didithediprasetyo.com

Ragowo Hediprasetyo (born 22 March 1984), or more commonly known as Didit Hediprasetyo, is an Indonesian fashion designer, socialite, and philanthropist. He is the only child of current Indonesian president Prabowo Subianto and his former wife, Titiek Suharto, as well as the maternal grandson of former Indonesian president Suharto.

== Early life and education ==
A member of one of the most prominent political families in Indonesia, Didit was born in Jakarta, on 22 March 1984. His father, Prabowo Subianto, is a former chief of the Indonesian Army's special forces who presently serves as the eight president of Indonesia. His mother, Titiek Soeharto is a socialite and politician, daughter of Indonesia's second president, Suharto. On his father's side, he is a grandson of Indonesian economist Sumitro Djojohadikusumo.

Upon attending a Shakespeare theater workshop at the Harvard Summer Extension School, Didit developed an interest in fashion at a young age. He graduated from the Parsons School of Design Paris in 2007, from which he took courses in painting, photography and art history. In 2018, he was nominated as an Art Fellow by the T. Washington Scholars program.

== Career ==
Didit presented his first Spring/Summer 2010 couture show in the salons of the Hôtel de Crillon in January 2010, offering corseted gowns and fitted skirts and shorts, and has since regularly presented collections during Couture week. He became the first Asian artist to design the interior and exterior of a special limited run of the BMW Individual 7 Series, of which only five were produced.

Additionally, he often gives a nod to his Indonesian origins by including Songket, a traditional hand woven Southeast Asian brocade, in his collections.

He and artist Golnaz Jebelli collaborated on designing Como 1907 jersey, inspired by the local Lake Como.
