= Edoardus Kaize =

Indonesian politician

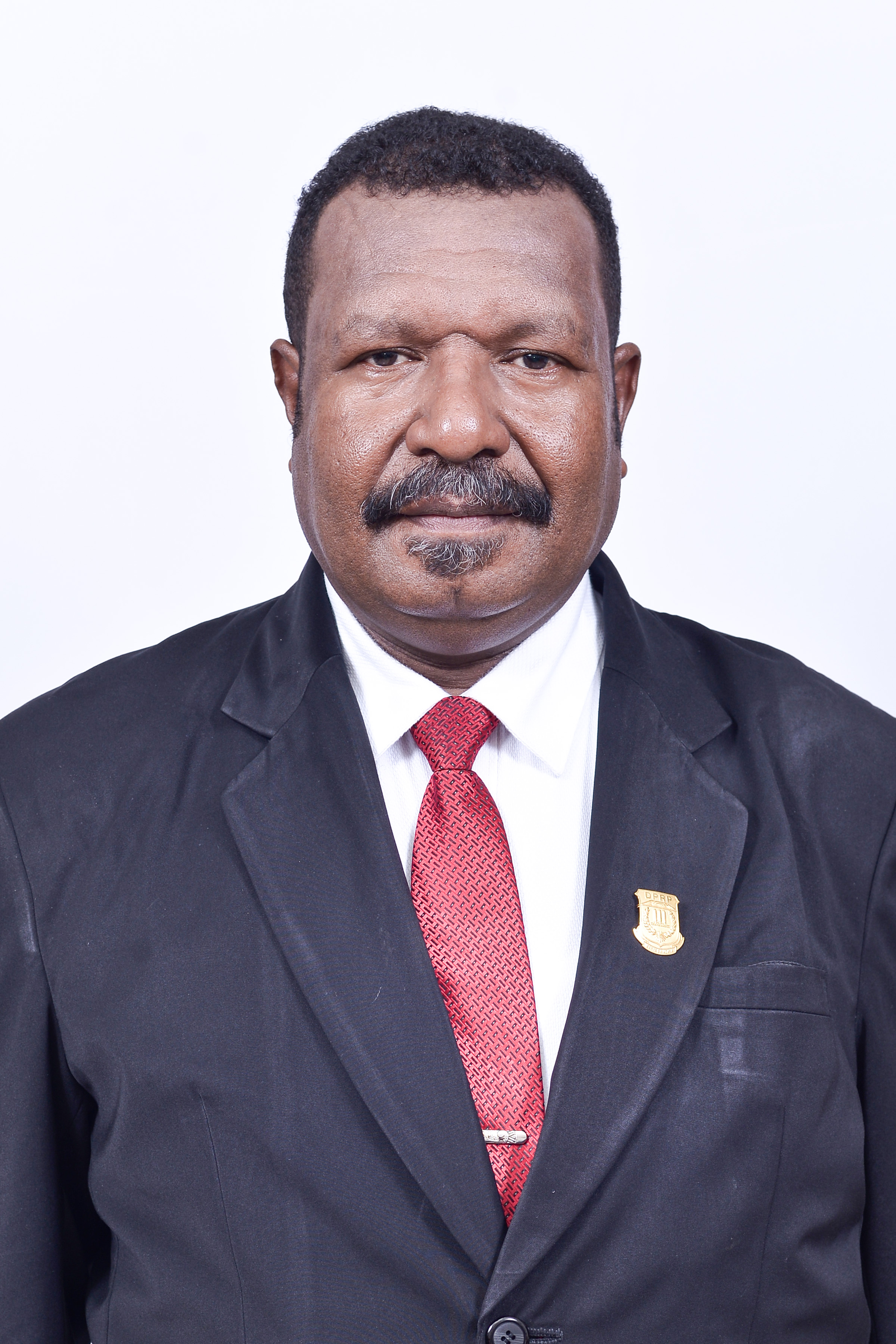
- Kaize as a DPRP member, 2019

Member of the House of Representatives
- Incumbent
- Assumed office 1 October 2024
- Constituency: South Papua
- Majority: 42,822

Deputy Speaker of the Papua House of Representatives
- In office 2014–2024

Member of the Papua House of Representatives
- In office 31 October 2014 – 1 October 2024

Member of the Asmat Regency DPRD
- In office 2004–2009

Personal details
- Born: 19 August 1971 (age 53); Merauke Regency, West Irian, Indonesia
- Political party: PDI-P

Edoardus Kaize (born 19 August 1971) is an Indonesian politician from the Indonesian Democratic Party of Struggle who is a member of the House of Representatives, representing South Papua since 2024. He was previously member and deputy speaker of the Papua House of Representatives between 2014 and 2024, during which he advocated for South Papua's secession as its own province, and before that served in the municipal legislature of Asmat Regency between 2004 and 2009.

== Early life ==
Edoardus Kaize was born in what is today Asmat Regency of South Papua, but was then part of Merauke Regency in West Irian, on 19 August 1971. He completed elementary education at a Catholic school, then studied at public schools and graduated from Merauke's public high school in 1993. He then studied theology in Jayapura, receiving a degree in 1998.

== Career ==
For some time, Kaize worked under the Roman Catholic Diocese of Agats. He was also active within the Indonesian Democratic Party of Struggle (PDI-P), and in 2003 he was deputy chair of the party's branch in Asmat Regency. In 2004, he was elected to Asmat's Regional House of Representatives as a PDI-P member and became a deputy speaker. Between 2009 and 2014, he was a staffer for PDI-P's fraction within the Papua Regional House of Representatives (DPRP).

=== DPRP ===
Kaize was elected into the DPRP in the 2014 legislative election, taking office on 31 October 2014. He was then elected as a deputy speaker of the body. In the 2019 election, Kaize was reelected for a second term and retained his position as a deputy speaker. Within PDI-P, Kaize became chairman of the party's Papua branch for the 2015–2020 term.

As a provincial legislator, Kaize has pushed for the preservation of the Okaba shoreline in Merauke from tidal erosion. He was also a supporter of the secession of South Papua from Papua as its own province. Responding to opposition to the secession, Kaize stated that the "mountain people" are not needed in South Papua's leadership. The province officially seceded from Papua on 25 July 2022 along with the provinces of Southwest Papua and Highland Papua, and Kaize became chairman of PDI-P's branch in the new province on 7 January 2023. He further stated that government-appointed acting governors for the new provinces should be indigenous Papuan people.

=== DPR ===
In the 2024 legislative election, Kaize ran for a seat in the national House of Representatives to represent South Papua, and was elected with 42,822 votes. Joining the body's Fourth Commission, Kaize has pushed for the government to include non-rice sources of carbohydrates to be included in the nationwide free school meals program.

== Personal life ==
He was married to Yohana Uropdana, who died in 2023.
