= Tifauzia Tyassuma =

Indonesian epidemiologist, health activist, and conspiracy theorist

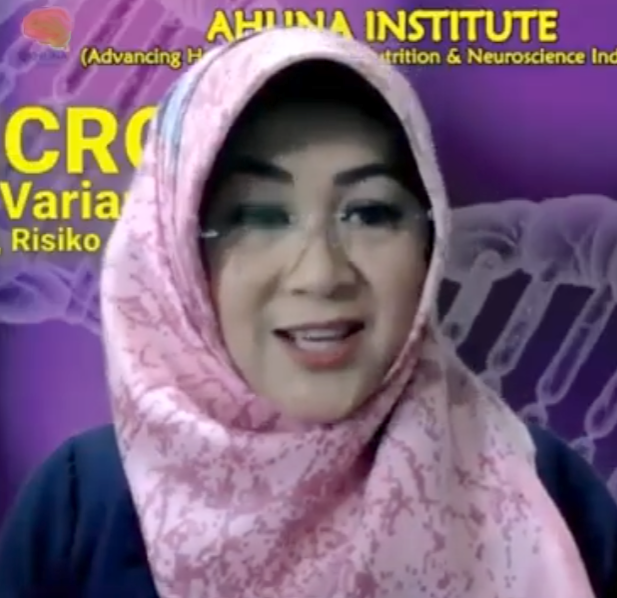
- In a 2022 video
- Education: Gadjah Mada University; University of Indonesia
- Occupations: Epidemiologist; Doctor
- Known for: Controversial views on public policy

Tifauzia Tyassuma, also known as Dr. Tifa, is an Indonesian health provider, author, and conspiracy theorist who is known for her controversial views on public policy, particularly in the fields of health and politics.

== Education ==
Tyassuma studied medicine at the Faculty of Medicine, Gadjah Mada University (UGM) in Yogyakarta, where she earned her medical degree and a Master of Science (M.Sc) from UGM. She then pursued doctoral studies in the field of Molecular Epidemiology at the University of Indonesia (UI). In addition, she also studied at the Norwegian Knowledge Centre for the Health Services.

== Career ==
Tyassuma has experience in clinical epidemiology and nutritional neuroscience. She served as Executive Director at the Center for Clinical Epidemiology & Evidence at Dr. Cipto Mangunkusumo Hospital in 2009 and as Secretary General of the Indonesian Clinical Epidemiology & Evidence-Based Medicine Network in 2010. Since 2017, she has led the Ahlina Institute, an organization focused on health literacy, nutrition, and spiritual neuroscience in Indonesia.

== Works ==
As an author, Tyassuma has published two books titled Body Revolution and Nutrisi Surgawi (Heavenly Nutrition), which explore the relationship between nutrition, health, and spirituality. She is also an active public speaker and healthy food practitioner, managing a catering service that emphasizes proper nutrition and high-quality ingredients. Dr. Tifa is known for being outspoken on social media, particularly on Twitter, where she frequently voices criticism of government policies, especially regarding the handling of the COVID-19 pandemic. She has also questioned the authenticity of President Joko Widodo’s diploma and criticized PDIP’s presidential candidate, Ganjar Pranowo, on various issues.

== Controversies ==
Tyassuma's views and statements often spark controversy and debate in the public sphere. One of her most polemical claims was that Agus Harimurti Yudhoyono (AHY) would become President of Indonesia for the 2029–2034 term. Additionally, she stated that the COVID-19 vaccine was no longer necessary because the population had already achieved herd immunity—a view that has drawn both support and criticism.

Through her statements on social media, Tyassuma questioned the authenticity of President Joko Widodo’s diploma from Gadjah Mada University. She highlighted several technical details, such as the style of the name printed on the diploma, which she argued did not match UGM’s conventions at the time. She also criticized the alumni book and thesis copy, suggesting that such documents could easily be fabricated. According to her, documents like these should be scientifically tested through forensic document analysis rather than accepted based on the claims of one party alone. Her statements, of course, did not go unanswered. UGM, through its rector, affirmed that Joko Widodo is indeed a graduate of the Faculty of Forestry in 1985.

Nusantara Patriotic Youth and Jokowi Volunteers reported Tyassuma to the Central Jakarta Metro Police on Wednesday, 23 April 2025. Joko Widodo also officially filed a report with the Jakarta Metropolitan Police (Polda Metro Jaya) against her, along with Roy Suryo, Rismon Sianipar, and Rizal Fadillah.
