= Titiek Suharto =

Indonesian politician and businesswoman (born 1959)

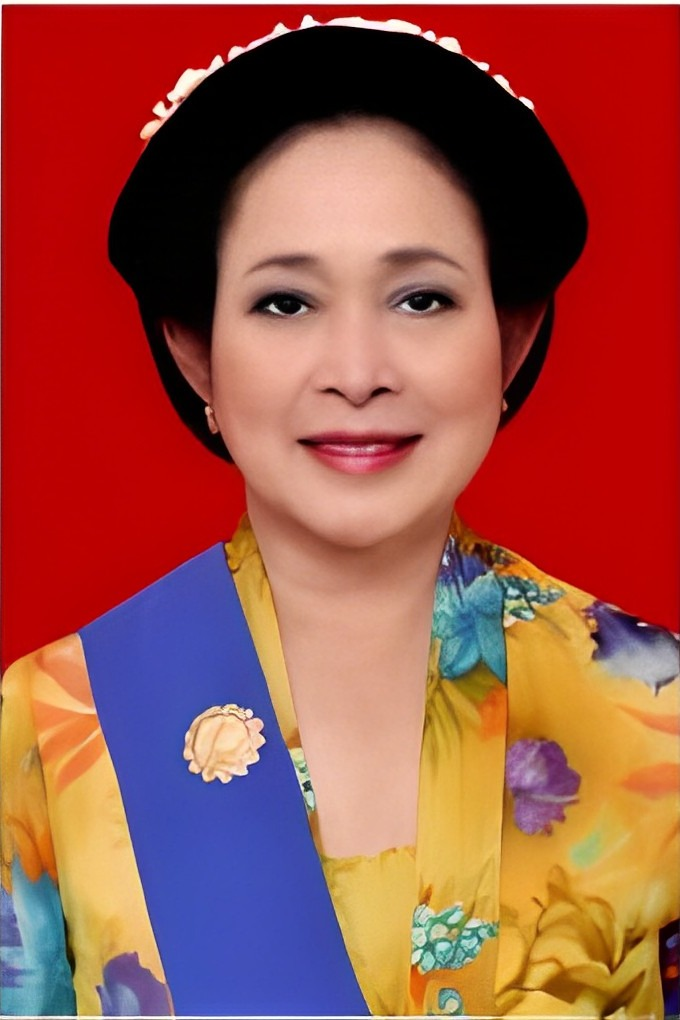
- Official portrait, 2024

Member of House of Representatives
- Incumbent
- Assumed office 1 October 2024
- In office 1 October 2014 – 11 June 2018
- Constituency: Yogyakarta

Personal details
- Born: Siti Hediati Hariyadi; 14 April 1959 (age 67) Semarang, Indonesia
- Party: Gerindra
- Other political affiliations: Golkar (2012–2018); Berkarya (2018–2023)
- Spouse: Prabowo Subianto (m. 1983; sep. 1998)
- Children: Didit Hediprasetyo
- Parents: Suharto (father); Siti Hartinah (mother)
- Relatives: Tutut Suharto (sister); Sigit Suharto (brother); Bambang Suharto (brother); Tommy Suharto (brother); Mamiek Suharto (sister)
- Education: University of Indonesia
- Occupation: Businessperson; politician

Siti Hediati Hariyadi (born 14 April 1959), popularly known as Titiek Suharto, is an Indonesian businesswoman and politician. She is the second daughter and fourth child of Suharto, the second president of Indonesia. She currently serves as a member of the Indonesia House of Representatives.

Initially a member of Golkar, she was elected to the House of Representatives in the 2014 Indonesian legislative election. She was re-elected to the House of Representatives in the 2024 election as a member of Gerindra. She currently chairs the Fourth Commission of the House of Representatives of Indonesia (Agriculture, Environment & Forestry, and Marine affairs). Out of 13 Commissions in the House of Representatives, she leads one of only 4 chaired by a woman.

== Early life and education ==
Titiek Suharto was born in Semarang, Central Java in 1959. She is the fourth child (and second daughter) of Suharto and Siti Hartinah. At that time, her father was Commander of the IV Military Regional Command/Diponegoro in Semarang with the rank of Colonel. Titiek is also a descendant of Mangkunegara III from her mother's side.

When her father was first inaugurated as president, Titiek's parents decided not to make Merdeka Palace their private residence. They moved instead from Jalan Haji Agus Salim (the street where they first lived in Jakarta) to Jalan Cendana in the suburb of Menteng. One of the main reasons for the move was security. There was a high-rise building behind the house in Haji Agus Salim. Merdeka Palace had not been her father's choice because he wanted his children to have freedom. At that time, Titiek was only 8 years old.

Titiek started her education at SD Cikini. She then continued her education at SMP Negeri 1 Jakarta and then at SMA Negeri 3 Jakarta (from 1974 to 1977). After graduating high school, she studied at the Faculty of Economics at the University of Indonesia majoring in accounting.

While studying at the University of Indonesia, one of Titiek's teachers was her future father-in-law, Sumitro Djojohadikusumo. When Titiek was first introduced as Prabowo's girlfriend, Sumitro said, "She looks familiar." After being in a relationship for almost two years, Titiek, who was still in college, married Prabowo in 1983.

She graduated in 1985 with a Bachelor of Economics. Her graduation ceremony was attended by her family members, including her mother (who was then the First Lady of Indonesia) and her husband, Prabowo (who at that time held the rank of Major).

== Career ==
=== Business career ===
Titiek started her business career in the 1980s. She partnered with her brother-in-law Hashim Djojohadikusumo on a cement business. In addition, she has held numerous board positions, including Commissioner at PT Mekar Unggul Sari which has been active in the recreation and agriculture industry since 1994, Commissioner at PT Bursa Efek Jakarta from 1995 to 1998, and President Commissioner at PT Abhitama. She ventured into the entertainment and broadcasting industry in 2005, when PT Abhitama purchased a 25% stake in PT Surya Citra Media Tbk. She was appointed Commissioner of PT Surya Citra Media in July 2005.

=== Political career ===
For the 2014 Indonesian legislative election, she was elected as a member of Indonesia's House of Representatives through Golkar, the political party that her father founded. In 2015, Titiek backed her brother Tommy Suharto to lead the party. In 2017, Titiek said she herself was ready to stand for the leadership of Golkar because the party's popularity had slumped. In June 2018, Titiek resigned from Golkar and joined Tommy's Berkarya Party. She complained her voice was not being heard in Golkar.

In 2023, she was appointed as a member of the advisory board of Gerindra, Prabowo's party. For the 2024 Indonesian legislative election, Titiek ran as a legislative candidate under Gerindra. She received the 2nd highest number of votes in her electoral district of Yogyakarta, securing a seat for Gerindra. She was elected as Chair of the Fourth Commission of the House of Representatives of Indonesia (Agriculture, Environment & Forestry, and Marine affairs). She has mentioned that her aim is to accelerate Indonesia's food security and food self-sufficiency.

=== Other activities ===
In the 1980s, she was actively involved with Persit, an organization of the wives of Army servicemen.

In 1996, Titiek was elected Chairman of Indonesia Table Tennis Association. In 2006, she appeared as a commentator for the 2006 World Cup.

In 2010, Titiek was elected Chairman of the Indonesia Archery Association for the term of 2010–2014 with support from 23 regional administrators during the association's national conference. In 2014, she was re-elected as Chairman of the Indonesia Archery Association for the term of 2014–2018.

Titiek has led the Indonesian Art Foundation from 2010 to 2015. In 2014, Titiek appeared as one of the judges of the Puteri Indonesia pageant. In 2025, she appeared again as a judge of the Puteri Indonesia pageant.

In 2021, during the COVID-19 pandemic, Titiek donated a sample of her blood for the development of the Nusantara vaccine.

Since 2023, Titiek has served as Chairwoman of Ratna Busana Association (Himpunan Ratna Busana), a community with a mission to preserve, promote, and foster a love of traditional Indonesian clothing.

== Personal life ==
In May 1983, Titiek married Prabowo Subianto, who was then a senior officer in the Indonesian Army's Kopassandha. Prabowo is the son of Sumitro Djojohadikusumo, one of Indonesia's most influential economists, who held ministerial positions under Presidents Sukarno and Suharto intermittently between 1950 and 1978. The wedding was held in Taman Mini Indonesia Indah.

She and Prabowo have one son, Ragowo Hediprasetyo (Didit), who was born on 22 March 1984. Didit is a well renowned fashion designer with achievements that include: Indonesian team uniform design for the 2024 Olympics, BMW Individual Series 7 interior design, and dresses worn by Hollywood celebrities such as Paris Hilton & Carly Rae Jepsen.

Titiek and Prabowo separated in 1998. However, the two have remained close with Titiek supporting Prabowo at rallies for his presidential campaigns in 2014, 2019, and 2024. As of 2024, both Titiek & Prabowo have chosen not to remarry anyone else.

== Awards and recognition ==
On May 5, 2025, Titiek received the “Outstanding Woman in Preserving the Traditional Fabric Industry” award at the 2025 Indonesia Leading Women Awards from CNN Indonesia. The award was given in recognition of Titiek's contributions to the preservation of traditional Indonesian fabrics as the Chairperson of the Ratna Busana Association (Himpunan Ratna Busana).

On December 22, 2025, on the 97th anniversary of the First Indonesian Women's Congress, Titiek received the 2025 Indonesian Srikandi Award (Anugerah Srikandi Indonesia) in the category of Srikandi Serving the Nation from Kompas TV. She was awarded in the same evening alongside Gusti Kanjeng Ratu Hemas, Retno Marsudi, Susi Pudjiastuti, Puan Maharani, and other prominent women figures.

== Electoral history ==
Election	Legislative body	District	Party	Votes	Result
2014	House of Representatives	Yogyakarta	Golkar	61.655	Elected
2019	House of Representatives	Yogyakarta	Berkarya	(Note: Berkarya did not pass parliamentary threshold.)	Not elected
2024	House of Representatives	Yogyakarta	Gerindra	145.489	Elected
