= Munir Said Thalib =

Indonesian activist (1965–2004)

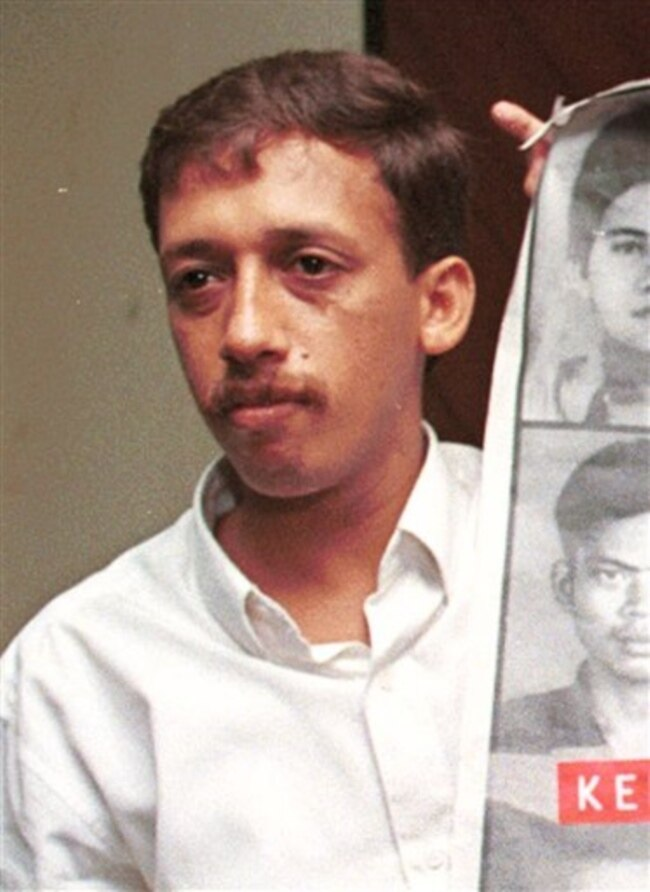
- Born: 8 December 1965; Batu, East Java, Indonesia
- Died: 7 September 2004 (aged 38); On a flight from Jakarta to Amsterdam
- Cause of death: Deliberate arsenic poisoning on board a Garuda Indonesia flight
- Education: Brawijaya University
- Occupations: Lawyer, Executive Director of Indonesian Human Rights Monitor (IMPARSIAL)
- Known for: Campaigner for human rights
- Spouse: Suciwati
- Awards: Right Livelihood Award

Munir Said Thalib (8 December 1965 – 7 September 2004) was an Indonesian human rights activist. One of Indonesia's most renowned human rights and anti-corruption activist, he founded Commission for Missing Persons and Victims of Violence (KontraS) in response to forced disappearances and state violence that happened under Suharto's Orde Baru regime which was escalated in the final years of the regime. After Suharto resigned and Indonesia entered into Reformasi, he continued his advocacy in addressing severe human rights violations, earning him a laureate of 2000 Right Livelihood Award.

In September 7, 2004, he was assassinated on board of Garuda Indonesia flight to Amsterdam through arsenic poisoning, a flight he intended to pursue a master's degree in international law and human rights at Utrecht University. Several arrests have been made, however many believed the assassination was politically motivated with the case remains unsolved.

== Political activist career ==
Munir was born in Batu, East Java into a family of Mixed Hadhrami Arab and Javanese origins, from tribe of Al Kathiri. He studied law at Brawijaya University in Malang in the province of East Java, and later started off his career in 1989 as a legal aid officer in the East Java provincial capital, Surabaya. He became one of Indonesia's leading human rights campaigners and faced intimidation, including death threats. He accused the Indonesian military of human rights violations in East Timor and in the troubled provinces of Papua and Aceh, and accused them of running a criminal network involved in illegal logging and drug smuggling.

He once fractured his hand whilst saving an elderly labourer from being beaten by security officials.

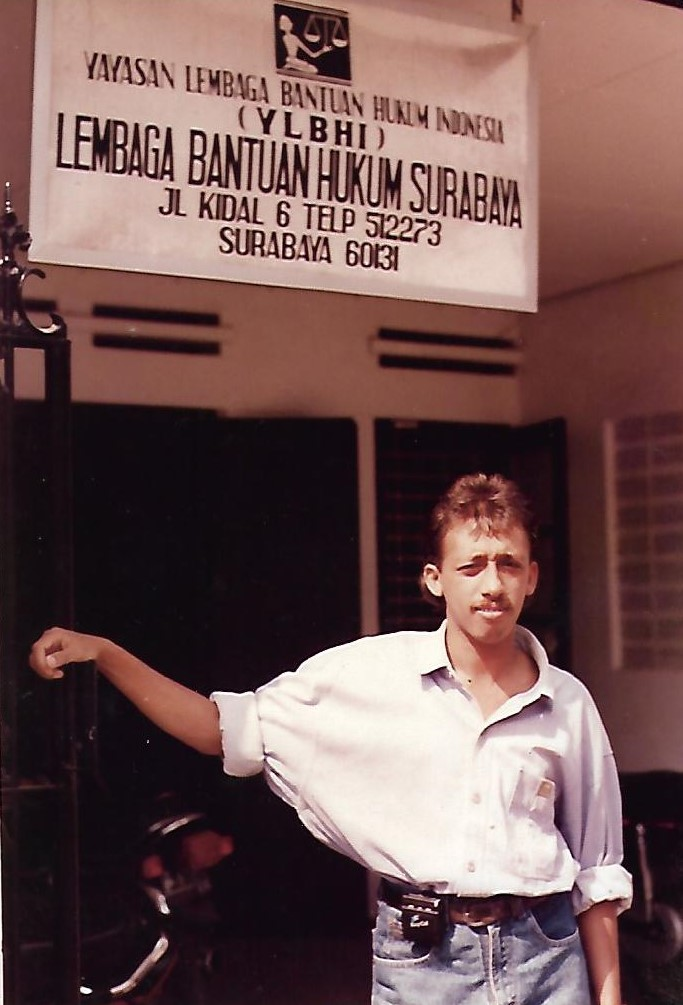
Munir in 1996

In 2001, while he was investigating Kopassus's role in kidnappings, a bomb package was delivered to his house.

== Assassination and aftermath ==
Munir was poisoned with arsenic on a flight from Jakarta to Amsterdam on 7 September 2004. He was travelling on state-owned airline Garuda Indonesia Flight 974 (GA-974) Boeing 747-400 registered as PK-GSG. It was concluded from Munir's autopsy and eyewitnesses during the trial that he had died two hours before arrival in Schiphol International Airport. He unknowingly ingested the arsenic during his flight transit in Singapore, or sometime near that time. In Singapore, Pollycarpus Priyanto, a Garuda pilot at the time and the prime suspect in Munir's trial, left the flight and then went back to Indonesia. Originally he departed from Indonesia by deadheading, with a fake document which allowed him to fly on another flight which was not his scheduled flight. Munir began to suffer acute diarrhea and bouts of vomiting shortly after his flight took off from Singapore to Amsterdam. The cabin crew informed the pilot in command that a passenger was sick, and a doctor who happened to be on the plane was asked to provide medical assistance. However, Munir died around two hours before the plane landed at Amsterdam.

When the results of the autopsy were released two months later, on 12 November, the Netherlands Forensic Institute revealed that Munir's body contained a level of arsenic almost three times the lethal dose. This was later confirmed by Indonesian police.

There were three suspects; Pollycarpus Budihari Priyanto, a former pilot who allegedly gave up his business class seat to Munir during the flight, and two flight attendants. It is alleged that Pollycarpus placed the arsenic in Munir's orange juice, upon orders from Garuda's chief executive at that time, Indra Setiawan.

Indonesian President elect Susilo Bambang Yudhoyono proclaimed that he would make sure that Munir's killers were brought to justice and quickly convened an independent investigation. However support and resources for the investigation waned, senior officials refused to comply, and the findings were never released.

In December 2005, Pollycarpus Budihari Priyanto was found guilty of Munir's murder by an Indonesian court and sentenced to fourteen years imprisonment. Munir's supporters claim that Pollycarpus was acting on orders and that this was not brought out during the court case.

In October 2006, the Supreme Court of Indonesia invalidated the conviction against Pollycarpus, citing insufficient evidence. However, in April 2007, police presented new evidence to prosecutors implicating Pollycarpus .

In October 2007, Indra Setiawan and his deputy, Rohainil Aini, faced trial for providing Pollycarpus with fake documents to board Munir's flight from Jakarta to Singapore. They would have faced a possible death penalty. They were both convicted and imprisoned for Munir's murder, and have appealed their convictions.

In 2007, a Jakarta court found that Garuda was negligent in refusing to perform an emergency landing, and ordered the company to pay 600 million rupiah in compensation to Munir's widow. When Garuda appealed this decision, the supreme court increased the compensation to an undisclosed amount. Garuda then failed to pay the compensation.

In November 2014, Pollycarpus was released from prison, having served nine of his sentenced fifteen years. He died on 16 October 2020 due to COVID-19 during the COVID pandemic after being treated for 16 days.

=== State Intelligence Agency involvement in assassination ===
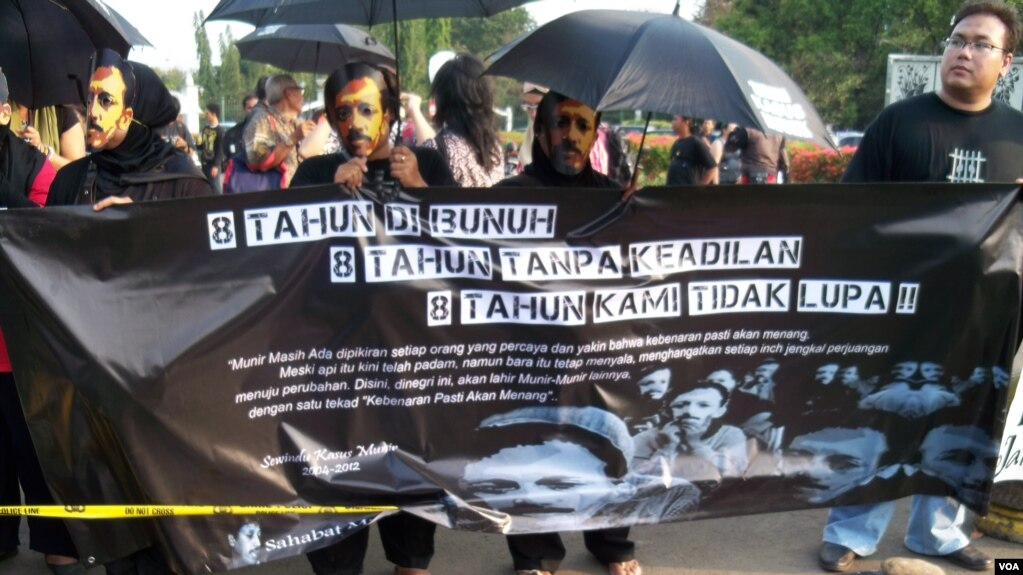
Commemorating the eighth anniversary of the murder of Munir Said Thalib, 14 November 2012. Until now, it is still unclear who the real perpetrator of Munir's murder was.

Top-level Indonesian State Intelligence Agency (BIN) officials were implicated in Munir's murder. The chief of police at the time, Sutanto, allegedly knew of the BIN involvement. A BIN deputy chairman, Muchdi Purwopranjono, was tried and acquitted for the murder in what has been internationally condemned as a "sham trial". Prosecutors accused Muchdi of ordering the killing out of anger over Munir's criticisms of his Kopassus leadership. Prior to the murder Pollycarpus made at least 26 calls to Muchdi, and a number of calls to a confidential BIN line.

A United States diplomatic cables leak alleged that former BIN chief A. M. Hendropriyono "chaired two meetings at which Munir's assassination was planned" and that a witness at those meetings told police that "only the time and method of the murder changed from the plans he heard discussed; original plans were to kill Munir in his office." When Hendropriyono was first appointed to the BIN it was bitterly condemned by Munir, who was guiding an investigation into Hendropriyono's role in human rights abuses for a prosecution.

Muchdi and Hendropriyono were both summoned for questioning by a presidential fact-finding team, but they refused to comply with the investigation. Recommendations by the team for Hendropriyono's prosecution were completely ignored by the police and the attorney general's office.

In 2014, Hendropriyono admitted to journalist Allan Nairn that he bore "command responsibility" for the assassination, and he was ready to accept being put on trial.

== Posthumous honours ==
Munir was posthumously awarded the Train Foundation's Civil Courage Prize, which recognizes "extraordinary heroes of conscience".

In 2013 a museum in Malang was opened in his honour.

== Personal life ==
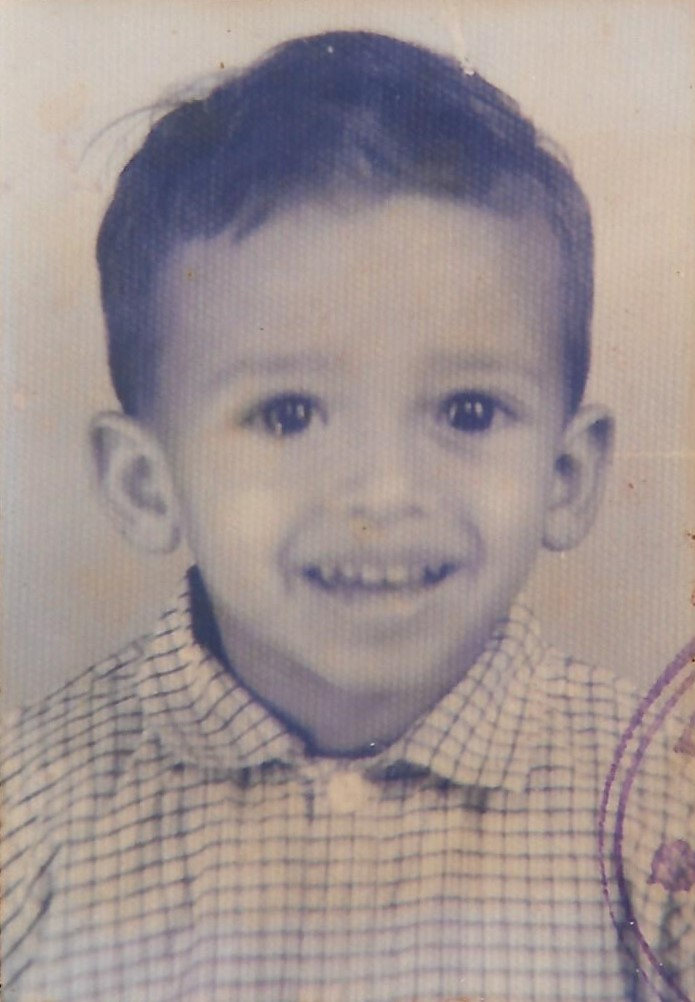
Munir during his childhood

Munir was married to Suciwati, a labour rights activist at the time. They had two children. His wife is pursuing the investigation of Munir's assassination and works to keep Munir's case and human rights at the centre of Indonesian politics.

== See also ==
- Human rights in Indonesia
- Right Livelihood Award
- Transparency International
