= Tommy Suharto =

Indonesian businessman and politician (born 1962)

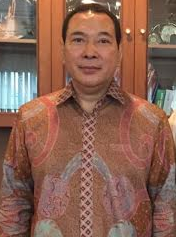
- Tommy Suharto in 2017

Chairman of Berkarya Party
- In office 11 March 2018 – 11 July 2020 (Note: Disputed. Tommy claims to be the legitimate chairman of Berkarya, but the Government of Indonesia legally recognizes Muchdi Purwopranjono as party's chairman.)
- Preceded by: Neneng A. Tuty
- Succeeded by: Muchdi Purwopranjono

Member of the People's Consultative Assembly
- In office 1 October 1992 – 21 May 1998

Personal details
- Born: Hutomo Mandala Putra; 15 July 1962 (age 64) Jakarta, Indonesia
- Party: Parsindo (since 2022)
- Other political affiliations: Golkar (1992–2016); Berkarya (2016–2022)
- Spouse: Ardhia Pramesti Regita Cahyani (m. 1997; div. 2006)
- Children: 2
- Parent(s): Suharto (father); Siti Hartinah (mother)
- Education: Institute of Business Law and Management (S.H.)
- Criminal information
- Status: Released October 2006
- Convictions: Murder, illegal weapons possession, fleeing justice
- Penalty: 15 years (reduced to 4 years after remissions and cuts)

Hutomo Mandala Putra (born 15 July 1962), commonly known as Tommy Suharto, is an Indonesian businessman and politician. The youngest son of Suharto, the second President of Indonesia, he has long had a reputation of nepotism and corruption. Following the end of his father's regime, he gained notoriety for orchestrating the assassination of a judge who convicted him of corruption. He was convicted of murder in 2002 and sentenced to 15 years imprisonment, but was paroled in under four years.

Since 2020, he has been involved in a leadership dispute with Muchdi Purwopranjono over control of the Berkarya Party.

== Early life ==
Tommy was born in Jakarta on 15 July 1962, the fifth child of Major-General Suharto and Siti Hartinah, better known as Ibu (Mrs) Tien. His siblings are Siti Hardiyanti Astuti 'Tutut' Rukmana, Sigit Harjojudanto, Bambang Trihatmodjo, Siti 'Titiek' Hediati and Siti Hutami 'Mamiek' Endang Adiningsih.

His middle name comes from the Indonesian military's Mandala Command for the Liberation of West Irian (Komando Mandala Pembebasan Irian Barat), which was formed in January 1962 and led by Major-General Suharto with the aim of removing the Dutch from the territory of Netherlands New Guinea (West Papua). Suharto wrote in his autobiography that Tommy's middle name served as a reminder of the Mandala assignment.

On 27 September 1965, when he was three years old, Tommy suffered injuries from boiling water to his face and body. He had been playing with his younger sister Mamiek in the family's house on Jalan Haji Agus Salim in Central Jakarta when he ran into his mother, who was carrying into the dining room a pot of boiling hot oxtail soup, which washed over Tommy. His mother immediately applied a cod liver salve to his blistered skin. He was rushed to the Gatot Soebroto Army Hospital in nearby Senen neighborhood. For the next three nights, Suharto visited Tommy at the hospital.

The timing of this injury is significant in the context of Indonesian history because on the night of 30 September 1965, an abortive coup attempt was launched by elements of the military, shooting dead six generals at about 4 am on 1 October. Before the killings took place, Suharto was still at the hospital. At about midnight, Tien urged Suharto to return home to check on Mamiek, who had been left with a servant. He went home about 12.15 am and went to bed and was awoken at about 4.30 am by news of the shootings. Tommy and his mother left the hospital on the afternoon of 1 October, accompanied by Suharto's half-brother Probosutedjo and aide-de-camp (ADC) Wahyudi. Tommy and his siblings were then moved to the ADC’s residence in Kebayoran Baru, as it was considered safer.

After completing junior high school in Jakarta, Tommy studied at the Civil Aviation Academy. He then went to the United States to study agriculture but did not complete his studies. He returned to Indonesia to start his business career.

It has often been said that Tommy was the favorite son of the family. Tien’s 1992 authorized biography states, "What sets Tommy apart from his elder brothers Sigit and Bambang, is that he has a more agile disposition. Tommy, who sports a mustache, is never without his RayBan sunglasses. At 28 years of age, he is the splitting [sic] image of his father. Deep in his heart, he cherishes great admiration for his mother."

As a young man, Tommy was known for his fondness for actresses, nightclubs and casinos. Time magazine in 1999 alleged that Tommy loved gambling and thought nothing of losing $1 million in a single sitting.

== Business and nepotism ==
In 1984, at age 22, he founded the Humpuss Group. With $100,000 of seed capital and within 10 weeks of its founding his group had 20 subsidiaries, which later grew to 60. The Humpuss Group initially focused on energy transportation, particularly LNG (liquefied natural gas). The company grew rapidly, relying on its shipping fleet and expanding into other business sectors such as petrochemicals, agribusiness, and property. Under Tommy Soeharto's leadership, the Humpuss Group was known for its aggressive diversification strategy. Tommy directed the company to enter various strategic sectors, capitalizing on opportunities in both domestic and international markets. Its primary focus was energy transportation, which remains one of the company's key strengths, through PT Humpuss Intermoda Transportasi Tbk. The fact that Tommy was no longer a member of the government after Soeharto's fall significantly impacted Humpuss' business. Several major government-backed projects stalled, and the company had to adapt its business strategy to survive.

=== Oil ===
In 1985, Tommy acquired a 65% stake in Perta Oil Marketing, a subsidiary of state oil and gas company Pertamina. He and his older brother Bambang Trihatmodjo received commissions of $0.30 to $0.35 a barrel. Perta brought in profits of $1 million per month.

Tommy and Bambang were alleged by a former business associate to have imposed "unofficial markups on oil exports and imports, reaping up to $200 million a year in the 1980s."

=== Sempati Air ===
In 1989, Tommy and Suharto associate Bob Hasan bought PT Sempati Air Transport from a military company. In the 1990s, Sempati Air (as it was renamed) flew wealthy Indonesians to a popular gambling resort on Australia's Christmas Island. The resort's main investor, Robby Sumanpow, was the marketing director of Tommy's clove monopoly. Sempati Air folded in 1998 during the financial crisis. When Suharto was charged in 2000 with corruption over the misuse of funds from charitable foundations, the indictment stated that Sempati Air had received Rp 17.91 billion from Dakab foundation, Rp 13.17 billion from Supersemar foundation and Rp 11.168 billion from Dharmais foundation.

=== Merak Toll Road ===
In 1989, Tommy formed a consortium, Marga Mandala Sakti (MMS), which lost a bid to his sister Tutut’s company to build Jakarta’s north harbor toll road, the North-South Link. MMS was however awarded the right to extend the Jakarta-Tangerang expressway another 73 km to the busy seaport of Merak. Humpuss constructed the toll road over 1992 to 1996. Tommy’s concession was in 1996 extended by 10 years to 2011. A consortium of foreign investors in late 1996 or early 1997 paid about Rp 425 billion ($181 million) for a majority stake in MMS.

=== Clove monopoly ===
In December 1990, Tommy established a clove trading monopoly, the Clove Support and Trading Board (BPPC), despite opposition from clove cigarette manufacturers. Under a Trade Ministry regulation, all local cigarette manufacturers were forced to buy from BPPC, which also controlled clove imports from other countries. A subsequent investigation found that Tommy forced clove farmers to sell at reduced prices and then sold the cloves to the cigarette industry at inflated prices. While Tommy profited, many clove farmers went bankrupt. The monopoly was dismantled in 1998 as part of the International Monetary Fund's package to bail out the Indonesian economy.

In July 2007, Tommy was named a suspect in a 175 billion rupiah corruption case involving BPPC. Then-attorney general Hendarman Supandji said Tommy misused loan money given to the agency to buy cloves from farmers. Tommy denied wrongdoing. In 2008, the Attorney General's Office dropped the case on the grounds that Tommy had repaid the money.

=== Golden Key scandal ===
In the early 1990s, Tommy acquired shares in one of three petrochemical plants proposed by Golden Key, a Jakarta-based company headed by businessman Eddy Tansil. The state-owned Indonesian Development Bank (Bapindo) was pressured to provide 16 loans totalling $430 million to Tansil to build the plants, even though he had no experience in petrochemicals and provided no collateral. Bapindo did not check his creditworthiness. The plants were never built and Bapindo was left with bad loans. According to a June 1994 article by the Far Eastern Economic Review, Tommy was the alleged go-between, who introduced Tansil to Bapindo officials. Before the scandal broke in 1994, Tommy had the previous year sold his shares back to other owners of the company. Tommy was not summoned as a witness at the trial of Tansil, who was in August 1994 sentenced to 17 years in jail and then "escaped" in 1996 and left Indonesia. The fact that Tommy had been a co-owner of the company when it obtained the loans and then sold his stake after part of the loans had been drawn upon in cash was not mentioned during the trials of Tansil and Bapindo officials.

=== Lamborghini ===
In 1994, Tommy's Bermuda-registered company Megatech, which is co-owned by Malaysian firm Mycom Setdco, purchased Italian sports car maker Lamborghini from Chrysler Corp. for $40 million. Megatech sold Lamborghini to Audi AG for $110 million during Indonesia's 1998 financial crisis.

=== Timor ===
1996 Australian Broadcasting Corporation report of the special tax exemptions given to Tommy Suharto's "National Car" contract.

In February 1996, president Suharto announced Indonesia's "National Car" policy, in which a company intending to produce a national car would be exempted from duties and luxury tax, and tariffs on imported spare parts. The only company allowed to benefit from the policy was Tommy's newly created PT Timor Putra Nasional. Japan, the US and the European Union complained to the World Trade Organization that Indonesia had violated WTO rules on equal treatment. Tommy was allowed to import 45,000 fully built Kia Sephia cars from South Korea and rebadged them as Timor cars.

In July 1997, state and private banks were encouraged by the government to provide a $650 million loan to Tommy to build a national car factory. On 23 September 1997, in response to the Asian Financial Crisis, Finance Minister Mar’ie Muhammad halted fifteen "mega" projects, but the Timor national car was absent from the list, prompting claims it was "untouchable". In January 1998, Suharto ended the Timor's tax breaks in line with reforms imposed by the IMF. Timor showrooms were subsequently targeted in the 13–15 May 1998 riots that precipitated Suharto's resignation.

The debts of PT Timor Putra Nasional (TPN) held by the Indonesian Bank Restructuring Agency amounted to Rp4.2 trillion. Tommy's Humpuss Group allegedly sponsored a company named PT Vista Bella to buy back TPN's debts on 30 April 2003 for Rp 512 billion, although under the sale agreement, the purchaser cannot be affiliated with the original owner.

The Finance Ministry and state-owned Bank Mandiri in January 2005 froze a TPN account containing some Rp 1.3 trillion as collateral against the Rp 4.2 trillion that Timor owed to Bank Mandiri. Tommy responded by suing Mandiri and the Finance Ministry. In November 2006, South Jakarta District Court ruled Timor the rightful owner of the Rp 1.3 trillion in the Bank Mandiri account. In November 2007, Jakarta High Court annulled the lower court's ruling. On 28 August 2008, Indonesian Finance Minister Sri Mulyani Indrawati stated that Bank Mandiri had been directed to transfer Rp1.23 trillion (US$134 million) of funds owned by TPN to a government account.

Tommy appealed twice to the Supreme Court, which on 13 December 2017 rejected his second appeal. The judgment was not sent to the court until 4 July 2018 and was not reported by the Indonesian media until January 2020, when the government announced it was entitled to the frozen funds.

Previously, the Finance Ministry had filed a graft case alleging Tommy illegally sold assets from Timor to five of his companies. Tommy responded by filing a US$21.8 million countersuit against the ministry. He won a separate US$61 million civil corruption case in February 2008, receiving US$550,000 in a countersuit.

=== Bali land scandal ===
In 1996, Tommy's company PT Pecatu Graha forced villagers off their land in Bali to build a 650-hectare resort. The evictions were backed by military personnel and police using tear gas. Landowners were offered compensation of 2.5 million rupiah per 100 square meters when the market price was 20 million to 30 million rupiah per 100 square meters. Time reported that residents who refused to sell their land were intimidated, beaten and sometimes immersed in neck-deep water, and two received six months jail time.

=== Explosives companies ===
PT Bina Reksa Perdana, in which Tommy was a majority shareholder, in the 1990s received a monopoly on the export of explosives made by state-owned explosives company PT Dahana. In partnership with Singapore's Chartered Oiltech Services, the company developed an explosives factory in Tasikmalaya, West Java, to make commercial explosives for export to countries such as Myanmar, Iraq, India and Australia.

Under Presidential Decree No. 86/1994 and Presidential Decree No. 14/1997, only two companies, PT Multi Nitroma Kimia and PT Tridaya Esta, were allowed to sell Dahana’s explosives for commercial use. The two companies were linked to Tommy and his brother Bambang Trihatmodjo.

=== 1997–1998 financial crisis and debt ===
After the 1997–1998 Asian financial crisis, the Indonesian Bank Restructuring Agency (IBRA) stated that Humpuss Group was the third largest debtor of irrecoverable loans from domestic banks, mostly from state banks, with a total debt of Rp 5.7 trillion in 2001. This was 2.5 times Humpuss Group’s annual sales in 1996. Of the total irrecoverable debt, more than half had been borrowed by PT Timor Putra Nasional. The debt was partly repaid to IBRA in assets, and some was later settled through debt restructuring schemes and debt-to-equity swaps.

=== Mangkuluhur City ===
In 2014, construction commenced of Mangkuluhur City, which Tommy is developing with businessman Harry Gunawan. The project comprises four skyscrapers and a high-rise building on Jalan Jenderal Gatot Subroto in Jakarta, Indonesia. The tallest of the towers will be 80 stories. Two of the towers are for office space, while the other two are for residential and serviced apartments. The existing Crowne Plaza hotel is part of the development. A Regent Hotel is also being developed at the site and was scheduled to open at the end of 2020 with nightly rates starting from Rp 3.5 million. This company oversees PT. Intra GolfLink Resorts alias IGR, which also has four subsidiaries, including PT Sentul Golf Utama which manages Palm Hills Golf Club Bogor, PT New Kuta Golf And Ocean View which manages New Kuta Golf Ball, PT Belitung Golf And Resorts which manages Black Rocks Hotel & Golf Belitung, and PT New Kuta Condotel which operates in the property and tourism sectors.

=== Humpuss Junior Racing Team ===
The Humpuss Junior Racing Team is an Indonesian racing team affiliated with the Humpuss Group, a conglomerate owned by Tommy Soeharto. The team focuses on developing young Indonesian racing talent, particularly in Formula One racing. Darma Mangkuluhur Hutomo, Tommy Soeharto's son, is a key figure associated with the team.

== Wealth ==
Time magazine in 1999 put Tommy's wealth at $800 million. In 2016, Tommy was listed 56th on GlobeAsia magazine's list of 150 richest Indonesians, with wealth of $655 million.

In September 2016, Tommy joined the government's tax amnesty program, in which tax cheats were rewarded with a tax rate of just 2–4% on assets previously hidden from authorities. Tommy declined to reveal how much tax he paid or the amount of assets he declared, but noted that most of them are abroad.

== Criminal convictions ==
Tommy faced criminal and civil trials after the fall of Suharto in 1998.

In April 1999, Tommy and his business partner Ricardo Gelael went on trial over an $11 million land scam. They were acquitted in October 1999 by South Jakarta District Court. In September 2000, a panel of three Supreme Court judges, led by Syafiuddin Kartasasmita, overturned the ruling and sentenced Tommy and Gelael each to 18 months in jail for corruption. Tommy refused to go to jail and went into hiding. Kartasasmita's wife later alleged her husband had refused a $20,000 bribe from Tommy.

The Supreme Court overturned Tommy's corruption conviction in October 2001, in a move that was viewed as part of a deal to make him come out of hiding. The Jakarta Post newspaper noted the ruling "destroyed what little credibility was left on what is supposed to be the last bastion of justice in this country".

In 2002, Tommy was convicted of masterminding the July 2001 assassination of Kartasasmita. He was sentenced to 15 years jail on charges of murder, weapons possession and evading justice. The court had found that Tommy paid 100 million rupiah to the two assailants that had killed Kartasasmita in a drive-by shooting. Tommy was also convicted for trying to flee justice from November 2000 after attempts to have his corruption conviction overturned or pardoned failed. While a life sentence or a death sentence was available to the judges, prosecutors sought 15 years. Tommy rarely showed up for his trial, claiming to be ill, and was absent when his verdict was announced. Instead, his paid supporters were present outside the court.

He served the first three weeks of his sentence in the Block H luxury wing of Cipinang jail, Jatinegara, East Jakarta, before being transferred to Nusa Kambangan Island prison off the southern coast of Central Java. His luxury 8 x 3 meter cell was carpeted and contained a sofa, a sideboard, a television, a refrigerator, cooking utensils, an air-conditioner, a water purifier, a laptop computer, and two mobile phones. He was often allowed to travel to Jakarta on the grounds of medical parole and was seen at an exclusive golf course. In April 2006 he was transferred back to Cipinang. His sentence was reduced to 10 years on appeal, and he was given conditional release on 30 October 2006. He spent a total of four years in detainment. Critics said Tommy was released solely because of his wealth and his family's enduring power.

=== Jakarta explosions ===
From late 1999 to September 2000, Jakarta was hit by a series of bombings, which were linked by some officials to efforts to prosecute members of the Suharto family, including Tommy, for corruption.

On 4 July 2000, Tommy was questioned at the Attorney General's Office as a witness in his father’s corruption case. One hour after he left, a bomb exploded at the rear of the Special Crimes Building (Roundhouse). Another bomb, which bore a military code, was found in a private bathroom on the second floor of the building and defused. Police questioned Tommy’s personal bodyguards over the bomb.

On 14 September 2000, a day before Suharto's corruption trial was to resume, a bomb exploded in the basement carpark of the Jakarta Stock Exchange, killing 15 people. The type of explosive used suggested military involvement. President Abdurrahman Wahid said the bombing was linked to his efforts to prosecute members of the Suharto family and that Tommy and his friend Habib Ali Baagil of the Islamic Defenders Front (FPI) might be involved. He ordered National Police chief Rusdihardjo to arrest Tommy and Habib for questioning. Rusdihardjo refused, prompting Wahid to complain he could not get sufficient cooperation from the police and the military to obtain evidence to secure arrests. Police later said two soldiers, including one from the Army’s Special Forces (Kopassus), had planted the bomb. Defense Minister Mahfud MD said Suharto's corruption trial should be canceled to prevent further violence. "If we keep meddling with this matter ... we will continue to be harassed … more terror will keep coming," he said.

=== 2001 bomb plot ===
Tommy on 14 January 2001 gave three bombs to his friend Elize Maria Tuwahatu at a meeting on Jalan Cilacap in Menteng, Central Jakarta, according to a statement by National Police spokesman Brigadier General Saleh Saaf on 23 January 2001. One day after receiving the bombs, Elize visited celebrity paranormal Ki Joko Bodo (real name: Agung Yulianto) and requested his assistance in a plot to bomb the Attorney General’s Office, the Trade and Industry Ministry and the Directorate General of Taxation. Elize asked Joko to help plant and detonate the bombs, promising an initial payment of Rp 10 million, and a bonus of Rp 1 billion if the bombs killed Attorney General Marzuki Darusman and Trade and Industry Minister Luhut Pandjaitan. The Tax Directorate General bombing was only to be a form of shock therapy.

Joko Bodo pretended to go along with the plot but instead called police and Elize was arrested in a sting on 19 January near the Soldiers Museum at Taman Mini Indonesia Indah (a theme park founded by Tommy’s mother) in East Jakarta in possession of the bombs. She confessed that Tommy had given her the bombs and shown her how to detonate them. Saleh Saaf said that since 1997, Elize had received Rp 150 million per year from Tommy. He also said Tommy had given her a blue Timor car. Her house on Jalan Suwiryo in Menteng was also reported to be a gift from Tommy.

Elize’s confession that Tommy gave her the bombs was later withdrawn by her lawyer, Masiga Bugis, who claimed her client was suffering mental problems. Elize was detained at Pondok Bambu women’s jail and went on trial at East Jakarta District Court in April 2001 for possession of explosives. The six-page prosecution indictment stated Tommy had ordered the bombings. Outside the trial, Elize said she had apologized to the "Cendana family" because Tommy was experiencing difficulties. She testified that the person who gave her the bombs looked like Tommy but she could not be sure it was him because it was dark. On 30 July 2001, Elize was sentenced to 10 years in jail, while Tommy remained at-large.

On 6 August 2001, police seized guns, grenades, explosives and ammunition at two Jakarta residences rented by Tommy: a unit in Cemara Apartment and a house in Pondok Indah.

== Other legal cases ==
=== Garuda Indonesia lawsuit ===
In May 2011, Tommy won a lawsuit against Garuda Indonesia for Rp 12.51 billion ($1.46 million) in damages. The case concerned a sponsored article titled "A New Destination to Enjoy in Bali" in the December 2009 issue of Garuda's in-flight magazine. The feature was supposed to be promoting Tommy's Pecatu resort, but a footnote at the end of the article, added by the translator, mentioned Tommy was a convicted murderer. Presiding Judge Tahsin said the article had ruined Tommy’s reputation "as a national and international businessman". He said Tommy's past should not have been mentioned because he had completed his prison term.

=== Rolls-Royce bribery case ===
In 2012, former Rolls-Royce employee Dick Taylor alleged the company gave a $20 million bribe and a blue Rolls–Royce car to Tommy in the early 1990s for his help in persuading Garuda Indonesia to buy Rolls’ Trent 700 engine for Airbus A330 aircraft. Tommy's lawyers in 2013 issued a statement denying their client had ever accepted any money or a car, or that he had recommended Rolls-Royce engines to Garuda Indonesia.

Britain's Serious Fraud Office (SFO) in 2017 entered into a Deferred Prosecution Agreement (DPA) with Rolls-Royce over the bribery and corruption scandal. Rolls-Royce was required to pay a total of £671 million for its criminal conduct in deals that covered Indonesia, Thailand, India, Russia, Nigeria, China and Malaysia. A summary by the SFO stated that bribes were paid by Rolls-Royce to two Indonesian intermediaries.

In October 2017, Tommy's lawyer Erwin Kallo reiterated the denial of Tommy's involvement in the case. He expressed concern that conventional media had been duped by fake news without checking sources. In particular, he singled out Wikipedia Indonesia for linking Tommy to the Rolls-Royce case even after the denials.

=== Toll road compensation lawsuit ===
In February 2021, the South Jakarta District Court heard a case in which Tommy sought compensation of Rp 90 billion from the state, a toll road company and a construction company over what his lawyers argued was inadequate compensation for an approximately 1,000 square meter office block acquired in 2017 to make way for the Depok–Antasari Toll Road.

== Political career ==
Tommy, Tutut and Bambang joined Golkar, Suharto's political party, and in 1992 were installed as members of the People's Consultative Assembly (MPR). Following Suharto's May 1998 resignation, Golkar announced in July it had recalled Tommy, Tutut and Bambang from the MPR. Golkar officials in 2008 said they would not object to Suharto's children rejoining the party's board, provided they were not involved in any outstanding legal cases.

In 2009, Tommy sought to become Golkar chairman at the party's congress held in Riau province. His campaign associate Saurip Kadi said Tommy would provide Rp 50 billion (then equivalent to about $5 million) to each Golkar regional chapter if elected. However, businessman Aburizal Bakrie promised a fund of Rp 1 trillion and was elected chairman.

In May 2016, Tommy announced he would again run for the chairmanship of the Golkar, but he did not register for the race. In the same month, Tommy was named as a member of Golkar's Supervisory Board.

In 2016, Tommy formed the Berkarya Party, a merger of Beringin Karya Party and Nasional Republik Party.

In March 2017, Berkarya and another small party, Swara Rakyat Indonesia (Parsindo), announced they were supporting Tommy to run for the presidency in 2019. In May 2017, Tommy said he was saddened by the present condition of Indonesia because corruption is thriving in parliament. In October 2017, his lawyer denied Tommy was planning to run for office in 2019, saying fake accounts on social media were falsely claiming he had been endorsed by mass organizations. On 11 March 2018, Tommy was named chairman of Berkarya Party. Tommy said it was a coincidence that 11 March was also the date former president Sukarno signed the Supersemar document in 1966 giving Suharto political powers prior to him becoming President.

=== 2019 Indonesian general election ===
In July 2018, Berkarya Party announced Tommy would be standing in the April 2019 general election as a candidate for the national legislature, representing Papua province. Berkarya secretary general Priyo Budi Santoso said Tommy chose Papua because he is fond of "the little people and marginalized areas".

In the opinion of Ed Davies and Agustinus Beo Costa, writing for Reuters, he sought to appeal to nostalgia about the unity and security of his father's government.

Tommy criticised President Joko Widodo's infrastructure development policy, saying it had caused Indonesia's foreign debt to rise to $340 billion, compared to $54 billion when Suharto was president.

Under Indonesian law, former prisoners who were sentenced to five years or more in jail cannot run for President, however, in 2018, Tommy said "There is not a single witness who testified against me in the trial. The verdict was indeed very harsh. I have served my term. According to the law, I now have the same rights as anyone else."

After obtaining 2.09% of votes and losing the 2019 general election, the party filed 35 appeals to the Constitutional Court. All were either revoked or rejected.

== Social media accounts complaint ==
In September 2020, Tommy's lawyer Azim Marekhan, filed a complaint to Jakarta Police regarding fake social media accounts in his client's name. He denied that Tommy has a Facebook, Twitter or Instagram account, and demanded the fake accounts be removed. He also said a YouTube account that pitted Tommy's "Cendana family" against President Joko Widodo had nothing to do with Tommy.

== Motorsport ==
Tommy had a motorsport career in various disciplines. In late 1989 he purchased a former Tom Walkinshaw Racing built Holden Commodore VL. He competed in Rally Indonesia in 1997 against World Rally Championship's top drivers. He also funded the development of Sentul International Circuit. Tommy was chairman of the Indonesian Motoring Association (Ikatan Motor Indonesia, IMI) from 1991–1995. After being released from prison in 2006, Tommy returned to motor racing by competing in the SS-12 National Championship Rally, held in Pecatu, Bali. Tommy drove a Subaru Impreza WRX, which he rolled at a corner, putting him out of the race. He was on IMI's Board of Advisers for the 2016–2020 period. His son, Darma Mangkuluhur Hutomo, is also a race car driver and serves as social and environmental director of IMI for the 2021-24 period.

=== Career statistics ===
==== Complete Indonesian Grand Prix results ====
(key) (Races in bold indicate pole position; races in italics indicate fastest lap)

Year	Car	1	2	Rank	Points
1993	Reynard 92D Mugen-Honda	SEN; Ret	SEN; Ret	NC	O

== Personal life ==
In the early 1990s, Tommy was in a relationship with singer Maya Rumantir and there was speculation they would be married. Tommy’s mother reportedly objected to the relationship because Maya is a Christian of Chinese-Manado heritage, whereas Tommy is a Javanese Muslim, so his parents preferred him to marry someone of Javanese royal lineage. In 2001, police questioned Maya during their search for Tommy when he was a fugitive. She denied hiding him. Tommy was also romantically linked to actress Nia Zulkarnaen, but Tommy's parents reportedly disapproved of the relationship.

On 28 April 1996, Tommy's mother died after a heart attack following a family dinner. Jakarta’s rumor mill speculated that Tommy and his brother Bambang had been arguing over the national car policy, and one of them fired a shot that hit their mother. The persistent rumor was denied by former National Police chief Sutanto (a presidential aide in 1996) in the 2011 book Pak Harto The Untold Stories. Bambang also dismissed the rumor as "communist slander".

At the age of 34, Tommy married 22-year-old Ardhia Pramesti Regita Cahyani, better known as 'Tata', on 30 April 1997 at At-Tin Mosque at Taman Mini recreation park. Tata is from royal lineage of Mangkunegaran principality of Surakarta. They have two children: Dharma Mangkuluhur and Radhyana Gayanti Hutami. On 15 May 2006, Tata filed for divorce and moved to Singapore. They were divorced in September 2006. In 2017, one of Tommy's lawyers, Salim Muhammad, said that prior to going to jail, Tommy had given Tata 100 billion rupiah to look after their two children. He claimed the money disappeared with Tata without a trace, without Tommy's knowledge.

While on the run from the law in 2001, Tommy spent some of his time living with former model Lani Banjaranti. Lani in 2003 announced she had a 13-month-old son, Syalif Putrawan, fathered by Tommy.

When Tommy was jailed on Nusa Kambangan prison for murder, he received overnight visits from his girlfriend Sandy Harun. She later gave birth to a daughter fathered by Tommy, Marimbi Djodi Putri.

In 2009, Tommy was romantically linked to model Catherine Wilson, after she was invited to one of his resorts in Bali.
