= List of political families in Indonesia =

Throughout history, Indonesia has had many politicians who gave birth to other politicians. Here is a list of prominent political families in Indonesia.

== The Anas Family ==
- Abdullah Azwar Anas (Regent of Banyuwangi, 2010–2015, 2016–2021; Minister of State Apparatus Utilization and Bureaucratic Reform, 2022–present)
- Ipuk Fiestiandani (wife of Abdullah Azwar Anas; Regent of Banyuwangi, 2021–present)

== The Baharsyah Family ==
- Sjarifuddin Baharsjah (academics; Minister of Agriculture, 1993–1998)
- Justika Baharsjah (wife of Sjarifuddin Baharsjah; academics; Minister of Agriculture, 1998; Minister of Social Affairs, 1998–1999)

== The Baswedan Family ==
- Abdurrahman Baswedan, 1908–1986 (journalist and diplomat, Member of the Investigating Committee for Preparatory Work for Independence of Indonesia; member of the Central Indonesian National Committee Working Group, 1945–1949; Vice Minister of Information, 1946–1947; member of the Constitutional Assembly of Indonesia, 1956–1959)
    - Anies Baswedan (grandson of Abdurrahman Baswedan; Minister of Education and Culture, 2014–2016; Governor of Jakarta, 2017–2022)

== The Bisri Family ==
- Bisri Mustofa (Islamic leader, politician; member of People's Consultative Assembly, 1971–1977; member of Constitutional Assembly, 1956–1959)
  - Muhammad Cholil Bisri, 1942–2004 (first son of Bisri Mustofa; sociologist, cleric, politician; Co-founder National Awakening Party; Vice Speakers of the People's Consultative Assembly, 2002–2004)
    - Yahya Cholil Staquf (first son of M. Cholil Bisri; cleric; Chairman of Nahdlatul Ulama, 2021–present)
    - Yaqut Cholil Qoumas (second son of M. Cholil Bisri; politician; Vice Regent of Rembang, 2005–2010; member of People's Representative Council, 2015–2019; Minister of Religion Affairs, 2020–present)
    - Mochamad Hanies Cholil Barro (third son of M. Cholil Bisri; politician; Vice Regent of Rembang, 2021–present)
  - Ahmad Mustofa Bisri (second son of Bisri Mustofa; Islamic leader; Co-founder National Awakening Party; Chief Adviser of Nahdlatul Ulama, 2014–2015)

== The Brojonegoro Family ==
- Sumantri Brodjonegoro, 1926–1973 (politicians, academics and professors; Presidium Bandung Institute of Technology, 1959; Rector of University of Indonesia, 1964–1973; Minister of Mining, 1967–1973; Minister of Education and Culture, 1973)
  - Bambang Brodjonegoro (son of Sumantri Brodjonegoro, economist; Vice Minister of Finance, 2013–2014; Finance Minister, 2014–2016; Minister of National Development Planning, 2016–2019; Minister of Research and Technology, 2019–2021)

== The Habibie Family ==
- Bacharuddin Jusuf Habibie, 1936–2019 (3rd President of Indonesia, 1998–1999; 7th Vice President of Indonesia, 1998; State Minister for Research and Technology, 1978–1998)
  - Rusli Habibie (nephew of B. J. Habibie; Regent of North Gorontalo, 2008–2012; Governor of Gorontalo, 2012–2022)
    - Ida Syahidah Rusli Habibie (wife of Rusli Habibie, Member of the People's Representative Council from Golkar, 2019–present)
- Junus Effendi Habibie (younger brother of B. J. Habibie, Ambassador of Indonesia to Netherlands, 2006–2010)

== The Hasan Family ==
- Zulkifli Hasan, (Minister of Forestry, 2009–2014; Speaker of People's Consultative Assembly, 2014–2019; Deputy Speakers of People's Consultative Assembly, 2019–2022; Minister of Trade, 2022–present)
  - Putri Zulkifli Hasan (first daughter of Zulkifli Hasan; member of People's Representative Council from National Mandate Party, 2024–present)
  - Zita Anjani (second daughter of Zulkifli Hasan; Vice of People's Representative Council of Jakarta, 2019–present)
- Zainudin Hasan, (first younger brother of Zulkifli Hasan; Regent of South Lampung, 2016–2018)
- Hazizi Hasan, (second younger brother of Zulkifli Hasan; Provincial representative in Bengkulu)
- Helmi Hasan, (third younger brother of Zulkifli Hasan; Mayor of Bengkulu, 2013–present)

== The Hasyim Family ==
- Hasyim Asy'ari, 1871–1947 (founder of Nahdlatul Ulama in 1926, which evolves to become the largest independent Islamic organization in the world)
  - Wahid Hasyim, 1914–1953 (son of Hasyim Asy'ari; member to both the Investigating Committee for Preparatory Work for Independence of Indonesia and the Preparatory Committee for Indonesian Independence, as well as one of the nine signatories of Jakarta Charter; twice Minister of Religious Affairs of the Republic of Indonesia in 1945 and later in 1950–1952, as well as the Minister of Religious Affairs of the Republic of the United States of Indonesia, 1949–1950)
    - Abdurrahman Wahid, 1940–2009 (eldest son of Wahid Hasyim; Chairman of the Executive Council of Nahdlatul Ulama, 1984–1999; founder of National Awakening Party in 1998; President of Indonesia, 1999–2001)
      - Yenny Wahid (second daughter of Abdurrahman Wahid; Director of The Wahid Institute; Secretary General of National Awakening Party, 2005–2008)
    - Salahuddin Wahid (second son of Wahid Hasyim; vice-presidential candidate in the 2004 presidential election)
    - Lily Chodidjah Wahid (daughter of Wahid Hasyim; member of the People's Representative Council from National Awakening Party, 2009–2014)
    - Abdul Halim Iskandar (Abdurrahman Wahid and Salahuddin Wahid's first cousin once removed; Minister of Villages, Development of Disadvantaged Regions, 2019–present)
    - Muhaimin Iskandar (younger brother of Abdul Halim Iskandar; Vice Speaker of the People's Representative Council, 1999–2009; Chairman of National Awakening Party, 2005–present; Minister of Manpower and Transmigration, 2009–2014)
    - Saifullah Yusuf (Abdurrahman Wahid and Salahuddin Wahid's first cousin once removed; State Minister of Development Acceleration for Disadvantaged Regions, 2004–2007; Vice Governor of East Java, 2008–2018; governor candidate in the 2018 East Java gubernatorial election; Mayor of Pasuruan, 2021–present)

== The Hatta Family ==
- Mohammad Hatta, 1902–1980 (1st Vice President of Indonesia, 1945–1956; 3rd Prime Minister of Indonesia, 1948–1950)
  - Meutia Hatta (eldest daughter of Mohammad Hatta; State Minister for Woman's Empowerment, 2004–2009; Chairman of Indonesian Justice and Unity Party, 2008–2010)

== The Idris Family ==
- Fahmi Idris, 1943–2022 (Minister of Labor & Transmigration, 1998–1999, 2004–2005; Minister of Industry; 2005–2009)
  - Fahira Idris (daughter of Fahmi Idris; Member of Regional Representative Council, 2014–present)

== The Jayabaya family ==
- Mulyadi Jayabaya (Regent of Lebak 2003–2013)
  - Iti Octavia Jayabaya (daughter of Mulyadi Jayabaya; members of People's Representative Council, 2009–2014; Regent of Lebak 2014–present)
  - Mochamad Hasbi Asyidiki Jayabaya (son of Mulyadi Jayabaya; members of People's Representative Council, 2014–2019)
- Vivi Sumantri Jayabaya (sister of Mulyadi; members of People's Representative Council, 2014–2019)

== The Joyohadikusumo Family ==
- Margono Djojohadikoesoemo, 1894–1978 (member of the Investigating Committee for Preparatory Work for Independence of Indonesia; 1st Head of the Supreme Advisory Council of the Republic of Indonesia, 1945; founder and the 1st director of Bank Negara Indonesia)
  - Soemitro Djojohadikusumo, 1917–2001 (son of Margono Djojohadikoesoemo; Vice head of Indonesian delegation to the UN Security Council, 1948–1949; Professor of Economics at the University of Indonesia since 1952 until his death; held various ministerial posts under both Sukarno and Suharto, including Minister of Finance, Minister of Industry and Trade, and Minister of Research)
    - J. Soedradjad Djiwandono (son-in-law of Soemitro Djojohadikusumo; Governor of Bank Indonesia; Member of the Supervisory Council of Gerindra Party)
      - Thomas Djiwandono (eldest son of J. Soedradjad Djiwandono; General treasurer of Gerindra Party, 2014–present; Deputy Minister of Finance, 2024–present)
      - Budi Djiwandono (youngest son of J. Soedradjad Djiwandono; member of People's Representative Council from Gerindra Party, 2019–present)
    - Prabowo Subianto (eldest son of Soemitro Djojohadikusumo; former lieutenant general in the Indonesian Army, and was commander of both Kopassus and Kostrad; former son-in-law of Suharto, married to Siti Hediati Haryadi from 1983 until separated in 1998; founder and chairman of Gerindra Party; vice-presidential candidate in the 2009 presidential election and presidential candidate in the 2014 and 2019 presidential election; Minister of Defense (2019–2024), President of Indonesia (2024–present))
    - Hashim Djojohadikusumo (youngest son of Soemitro Djojohadikoesoemo; Member of the Supervisory Council of Gerindra Party)
      - Aryo Djojohadikusumo (son of Hashim Djojohadikusumo; member of People's Representative Council from Gerindra Party, 2014–2019)
      - Rahayu Saraswati Djojohadikusumo (daughter of Hashim Djojohadikusumo; member of People's Representative Council from Gerindra Party, 2014–2019; vice-mayoral candidate in the 2020 South Tangerang mayoral election)

== The Kalla–Aksa Family ==
- Jusuf Kalla (businessman-politician; Vice President of Indonesia, 2004–2009 and again in 2014–2019; Chairman of Golkar Party, 2004–2009)
- Aksa Mahmud (businessman-politician; brother-in-law of Jusuf Kalla; Deputy Speakers of the People's Consultative Assembly, 2004–2009)
  - Erwin Aksa (son of Aksa Mahmud; prominent member of Golkar Party);
  - Munafri Arifuddin, (son-in-law of Aksa Mahmud; mayoral candidate in the 2018 and 2020 mayoral election of Makassar, the capital of South Sulawesi)
- Halim Kalla (younger brother of Jusuf Kalla; member of the People's Representative Council from Golkar Party, 2009–2014)

== The Kartasasmita Family ==
- Ginandjar Kartasasmita (soldier and politician; Minister of Mining & Energy, 1988–1993; State Minister of National Development Planning, 1993–1998; Coordinating Minister for Economics, Finance and Industry, 1998–1999; Speaker of the Regional Representative Council, 2004–2009)
  - Agus Gumiwang Kartasasmita (son of Ginandjar Kartasasmita, Politician; Member of People Representative Council, 1999–2018; Minister of Social Affairs, 2018–2019; Minister of Industry, 2019–present)
- Sabana Kartasasmita (brother of Ginandjar Kartasasmita, banker and diplomat; Indonesian Ambassador to Belgium, 1995–1997)

== The Kusumaatmaja Family ==
- Mochtar Kusumaatmadja, 1929–2021 (academics and diplomats; Minister of Justice, 1973–1978; Minister of Foreign Affairs, 1978–1988)
  - Armida Salsiah Alisjahbana (daughter of Mochtar Kusumaatmadja; Minister for National Development Planning, 2009–2014; Executive Secretary, United Nations Economic and Social Commission for Asia and Pacific, 2018–present)
- Sarwono Kusumaatmadja (younger brother of Mochtar Kusumaatmadja; politician; Minister of State Apparatus Utilization and Bureaucratic Reform, 1988–1993; Minister of Environment, 1993–1998; Minister of Marine Exploration, 1999–2001)

== The Laoh Family ==
- Frits Laoh, 1888–1961 (bureaucrat, politician; Minister of Transportation, 1955–1956)
- Herling Laoh (younger brother of Frits Laoh; politician, bureaucrat and entrepreneur; Minister of Transportation, 1949–1950; Minister of Public Works, 1947–1950; Vice Minister of Public Works, 1946–1947)

== The Leimena Family ==
- Johannes Leimena, 1905–1977 (physician, politician; Vice Minister of Health, 1946–1947; Minister of Health, 1947–1953 & 1955–1956; Chairman of Indonesian Christian Party, 1950–1961; Minister of Social Affairs, 1957; Vice Prime Minister of Indonesia, 1957–1966; Minister of Distribution, 1959–1966)
  - Melani Leimena Suharli (daughter of Johannes Leimena; politician; member of People's Representative Council, 2009–present; Deputy Speakers of People's Consultative Assembly, 2009–2014)

== The Limpo Family ==
- Yasin Daeng Limpo, 1924–2009 (retired colonel in the Indonesian Army; Regent of Gowa and Maros)
- Nurhayati Yasin Limpo (wife of Yasin Daeng Limpo; member of Regional People Representative's Council of South Sulawesi, 1987–1999; Member of People Representative's Council from Golkar, 1999–2004)
  - Tenri Olle Yasin Limpo (first daughter of Yasin Daeng Limpo; Chairman of Regional People Representative's Council of Gowa, 2009–2014; Member of Regional People Representative's Council of South Sulawesi; 2014–2019)
  - Syahrul Yasin Limpo (first son of Yasin Daeng Limpo; Regent of Gowa, 1994–2002; Vice Governor of South Sulawesi, 2003–2008; Governor of South Sulawesi, 2008–2018; Minister of Agriculture, 2019–2023)
    - Indira Chunda Thita Syahrul (daughter of Syahrul Yasin Limpo; member of People's Representative Council from National Mandate Party, 2009–2019)
  - Tenri Angka Yasin Limpo (second daughter of Yasin Daeng Limpo; member of Regional People Representative's Council of Makassar)
  - Dewie Yasin Limpo (third daughter of Yasin Daeng Limpo; former member of People's Representative Council from People's Conscience Party, 2014–2016)
  - Ichsan Yasin Limpo, 1961–2019 (second son of Daeng Yasin Limpo; Regent of the Gowa, 2005–2015; candidate for governor in the 2018 South Sulawesi gubernatorial election)
    - Adnan Purichta Ichsan (son of Ichsan Yasin Limpo; Regent of Gowa, 2016–present)

== The Mintaredja Family ==
- Mohammad Syafaat Mintaredja founder and 1st chairman of the United Development Party (1973 – 1978), 19th Ministry of Social Affairs (Indonesia) (1971 – 1978), 7th Ambassador of Indonesia to Turkey (1980 – 1983)
- Evac Syafruddin Mintaredja (eldest son of Mohammad Syafaat Mintaredja; Head of the Media Bureau at Ministry of State Secretariat under Vice President Jusuf Kalla)
- Arie Syafriandi Mintaredja (son of Evac Syafruddin Mintaredja; entrepreneur)

== The Majdi Family ==
- Muhammad Zainul Majdi, known as Tuan Guru Bajang (religious leader; Governor of West Nusa Tenggara, 2008–2018)
- Sitti Rohmi Djalilah (older sister of Muhammad Zainul Majdi; Vice Governor of West Nusa Tenggara, 2018–2023)

== The Mangindaan Family ==
- Evert Ernest Mangindaan (military; Governor of North Sulawesi, 1995–2000; State Minister of State Apparatus Utilization and Bureaucratic Reform, 2009–2011; Ministry of Transportation, 2011–2014; Deputy Speakers of the People's Consultative Assembly, 2014–2019)
  - Harley Alfredo Benfica Mangindaan (son of E. E. Mangindaan; Vice Mayor of Manado, 2010–2015)

== The Mappasessu Family ==
- Rusdi Masse Mappasessu (entrepreneur, politician; Regent of Sidenreng Rappang, 2008–2018; Member of People's Consultative Assembly, 2019–present)
- Fatmawati Rusdi (wife of Rusdi Mappasessu; politician; Member of People's Consultative Assembly, 2014–2018; Vice Mayor of Makassar, 2021–2023)

== The Matajang Family ==
- Sonda Daeng Matajang (politician; member of the Provisional Representative Body of East Indonesia, 1946–1947; member of the People's Representative Council, 1950–1956; temporary leader of the federal parliament of Indonesia)
    - Andi Nafsiah Mboi (granddaughter of Sonda Daeng Matajang; medical doctor, Minister of Health, 2012–2014)
    - Aloysius Benedictus Mboi, 1935–2015 (husband of Andi Nafsiah Mboi; medical-military doctor; Governor of East Nusa Tenggara, 1978–1988)
    - Andi Erna Witoelar (sister of Andi Nafsiah Mboi; Minister of Human Settlements and Regional Development, 2000–2001)
    - Rachmat Witoelar (husband of Andi Erna Witoelar; State Minister of Environment, 2004–2009; Indonesian Ambassador to the Russian Federation, 1993–1997)
    - Wimar Witoelar, 1945–2021 (brother-in-law of Erna Witoelar; Spokesperson of the President of Indonesia, 1999–2001)

== The Muluk Family ==
- Farid Anfasa Moeloek (medical doctor, professor; Minister of Health, 1998–1999)
- Nila Djuwita Moeloek (wife of Faried Anfasa Moeloek; medical doctor, professor; Minister of Health, 2014–2019)

== The Natakusumah family ==
- Achmad Dimyati Natakusumah (Regent of Pandeglang, 2000–2009; member of the People's Representative Council, 2009–2018, 2019–present)
  - Rizki Aulia Rahman Natakusumah (son of Achmad Dimyati Natakusumah; member of the People's Representative Council, 2019–present)
- Irna Narulita (wife of Achmad Dimyati Natakusumah; Regent of Pandeglang, 2016–present; member of the People's Representative Council, 2009–2015)

== The Paloh Family ==
- Surya Paloh (Chairman of NasDem Party, 2013–present)
  - Prananda Surya Paloh (son of Surya Paloh member of the People's Representative Council from Nasdem Party, 2014–present)

== The Pramono Family ==
- Pramono Anung (politician; Governor of Jakarta, 2024–present; Cabinet Secretary of Indonesia, 2015–2024)
  - Hanindhito Himawan Pramono (son of Pramono Anung; Regent of Kediri, 2021–present)

== The Purnomo Family ==
- Sri Purnomo (Regent of Sleman, 2009–2021;Vice Regent of Sleman, 2005–2009)
- Kustini Sri Purnomo (wife of Sri Purnomo; Regent of Sleman, 2021–2024)
  - Raudi Akmal (son of Sri and Kustini; Member of Sleman Regional House of Representatives, 2019–2024)
- Zamiwah (Relative of Sri Purnomo; Member of Central Java Regional House of Representatives)
  - Haryadi Suyuti (son of Zamiwah; Mayor of Yogyakarta, 2011–2022; Vice Mayor of Yogyakarta, 2006–2011)
- Ahmad Zahid Hamidi (distant relative; Deputy Prime Minister of Malaysia, 2015–2018, 2022–present; Leader of the Opposition, 2018–2019)

== The Puspayoga Family ==
- Anak Agung Gede Ngurah Puspayoga (politician; Mayor of Denpasar, 2000–2008; Vice Governor of Bali, 2008–2013; Minister of Cooperatives and Small & Medium Enterprises, 2014–2019)
- I Gusti Ayu Bintang Darmawati (wife of AAGN Puspayoga, politician; Minister of Women Empowerment and Child Protection, 2019–present)
- I Gusti Ngurah Jaya Negara (brother of I Gusti Ayu Bintang Darmawati; politician; Vice Mayor of Denpasar, 2010–2015 and 2016–2021; Mayor of Denpasar, 2021–present)

== The Rudi Family ==
- Muhammad Rudi (police officer; Mayor of Batam, 2016–present; Vice Mayor of Batam 2011–2016)
- Marlin Agustina (wife of Muhammad Rudi; Vice Governor of Riau Islands 2021–present)

== The Saifuddin Family ==
- Saifuddin Zuhri, 1919–1986 (Minister of Religious Affairs, 1962–1967)
  - Lukman Hakim Saifuddin (son of Saifuddin Zuhri; Deputy Speakers of the People's Consultative Assembly, 2009–2014; Minister of Religious Affairs, 2014–2019)

== The Salim Family ==
- Agus Salim, 1884–1954 (journalist, diplomat, and statesman; Vice Foreign Minister, 1946–1947; Minister of Foreign Affairs, 1947–1949)
  - Emil Salim (nephew of Agus Salim; economist and politician; State Minister for the Improvement of the State Apparatus, 1971–1973; Minister of Transportation, 1973–1978; State Minister for Development Supervision and the Environment,1978–1983, State Minister for Population and the Environment, 1983–1993)

== The Sambuaga Family ==
- Theo L. Sambuaga (Golkar politician; Minister of Labor, 1998; State Minister of Public Housing and Settlements, 1998–1999)
  - Jerry Adithya Ksatria Sambuaga (son of Theo L. Sambuaga; Golkar politician, Vice Minister of Trade, 2019–present)

== The Sani Family ==
- Muhammad Sani, 1942–2016 (politician; Regent of Karimun, 2001–2005, Vice Governor of Riau Islands, 2005–2010, Governor of Riau Islands, 2010–2015, 2016)
- Isdianto (younger brother of Muhammad Sani; politician; Vice Governor of Riau Islands, 2016–2019; Acting Governor of Riau Islands, 2019–2020; Governor of Riau Islands, 2020–2021)

== The Shihab Family ==
- Abdurrahman Shihab (academican, politician, and Qur'anic interpretation expert; Member of Constitutional Assembly of Indonesia, 1956–1959; Rector of the Indonesian Muslim University, 1959–1965; Rector of the Alauddin Islamic State University, 1973–1979)
  - Quraish Shihab (son of Abdurrahman Shihab; author, cleric, politician; Rector of Syarif Hidayatullah University, 1992–1998; Minister of Religious Affairs, 1998)
  - Alwi Shihab (son of Abdurrahman Shihab; politician; Foreign Minister, 1999–2001; Coordinating Minister for People's Welfare, 2004–2005)
  - Nizar Shihab (son of Abdurrahman Shihab; physician, politician; Member of People's Representative Council, 2009–2014)

== The Sochib Family ==
- Tubagus Chasan Sochib, 1930–2011 (businessman-politician)
  - Ratu Atut Chosiyah (daughter of Tubagus Chasan Sochib; politician; Vice Governor of Banten, 2002–2005; Acting Governor of Banten, 2005–2007; Governor of Banten, 2007–2014)
  - Hikmat Tomet, 1955–2013 (husband of Ratu Atut Chosiyah; member People's Representative Council, 2009–2013)
    - Andika Hazrumy (son of Ratu Atut Chosiyah; politician; member of Regional Representative Council, 2009–2014; member of People's Representative Council, 2014–2017; Vice Governor of Banten, 2017–2022)
    - Adde Rosi Khoerunnisa (daughter-in-law of Ratu Atut Chosiyah; wife of Andika Hazrumy; member of Regional People's Representative Council of Banten 2014–2019)
    - Andiara Aprilia Hikmat (daughter of Ratu Atut Chosiyah; politician; member of Regional Representative Council, 2014–present)
  - Ratu Tatu Chasanah (younger sister of Ratu Atut Chosiyah; politician; Vice Regent of Serang, 2010–2015; Regent of Serang, 2016–present)
    - Pilar Saga Ichsan (son of Ratu Tatu Chasanah; Vice Mayor of South Tangerang, 2021–present)
  - Tubagus Haerul Jaman (step brother of Ratu Atut Chosiyah; politician; Vice Mayor of Serang, 2008–2011; Mayor of Serang, 2011–2018)
  - Airin Rachmi Diany (sister-in-law of Ratu Atut Chosiyah; model, notary public; Mayor of South Tangerang, 2011–2021)
- Heryani Yuhana (step-mother of Ratu Atut Chosiyah; fifth wife of Chasan Sochib; member of Regional People's Representative Council of Banten 2009–2011; Vice Regent of Pandeglang, 2011–2016)

== The Solthan Family ==
- Solthan (politician; Regent of Bantaeng, 1966–1971)
  - Azikin Solthan (politician; Regent of Bantaeng, 1998–2008; member of People's Representative Council, 2014–present)
    - Ilham Syah Azikin (politician; Regent of Bantaeng, 2018–2023)

== The Sudarsono Family ==
- Sudarsono Mangoenadikoesoemo (medical doctor; politician; Minister of Social Affairs, 1945–1946; Minister of Home Affairs, 1946; Indonesian Ambassador to India, 1950–1953)
  - Juwono Sudarsono (son of Sudarsono; State Minister for the Environment, 1998; Minister of Education and Culture, 1998–1999; Minister of Defense, 1999–2000, 2004–2009; Indonesian Ambassador to the United Kingdom, 2003–2004)

== The Suharto Family ==
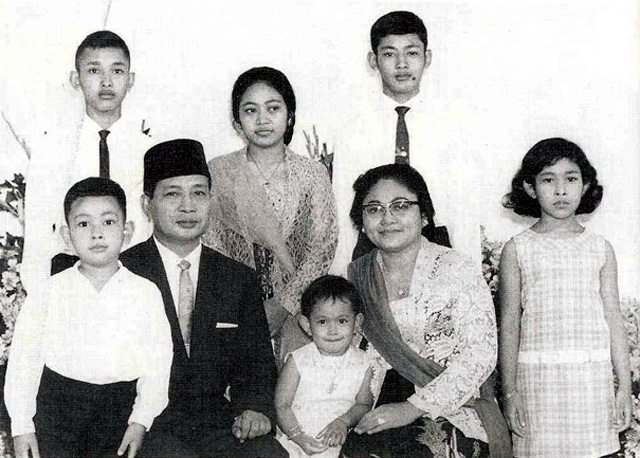
Suharto family (ca. 1967)

- Suharto (President of Indonesia, 1967–1998)
  - Siti Hardiyanti Rukmana (eldest daughter of Suharto, member of the People's Representative Council from Golkar, 1992–1998; Minister for Social Affairs, 1998)
  - Bambang Trihatmodjo (second son of Suharto, member of the People's Representative Council from Golkar, 1992–1998)
  - Siti Hediati Hariyadi (second daughter of Suharto, member of the People's Representative Council from Golkar, 2014–2018)
  - Hutomo Mandala Putra (third and youngest son of Suharto, member of the People's Representative Council from Golkar, 1992–1998; former chairman of Berkarya Party

== The Sukardi–Hartarto Family ==
- Didi Sukardi, 1898–1971 (journalist, plantation owner and government minister of the federal state of Pasundan)
  - Hartarto Sastrosoenarto, 1932–2017 (son-in-law of Didi Sukardi; Minister of Industry, 1983–1993; Coordinating Minister for Production and Distribution, 1993–1998; State Coordinating Minister for the Supervision of Development and Utilization of the State Apparatus, 1998–1999)
    - Airlangga Hartarto (son of Hartarto Sastrosoenarto; Minister of Industry, 2016–2019; Chair of Golkar, 2017–present; Coordinating Minister for Economic Affairs of Indonesia, 2019–present)
    - Laksamana Sukardi (grandson of Didi Sukardi, nephew of Hartarto Sastrosoenarto; politician, reformist and banker; Minister of State Owned Enterprises, 1999–2000, 2001–2004)
    - Pasha Ismaya Sukardi (grandson of Didi Sukardi, nephew of Hartarto Sastrosoenarto; politician; Member of People's Representative Council, 2009–2014)

== The Sukarno Family ==
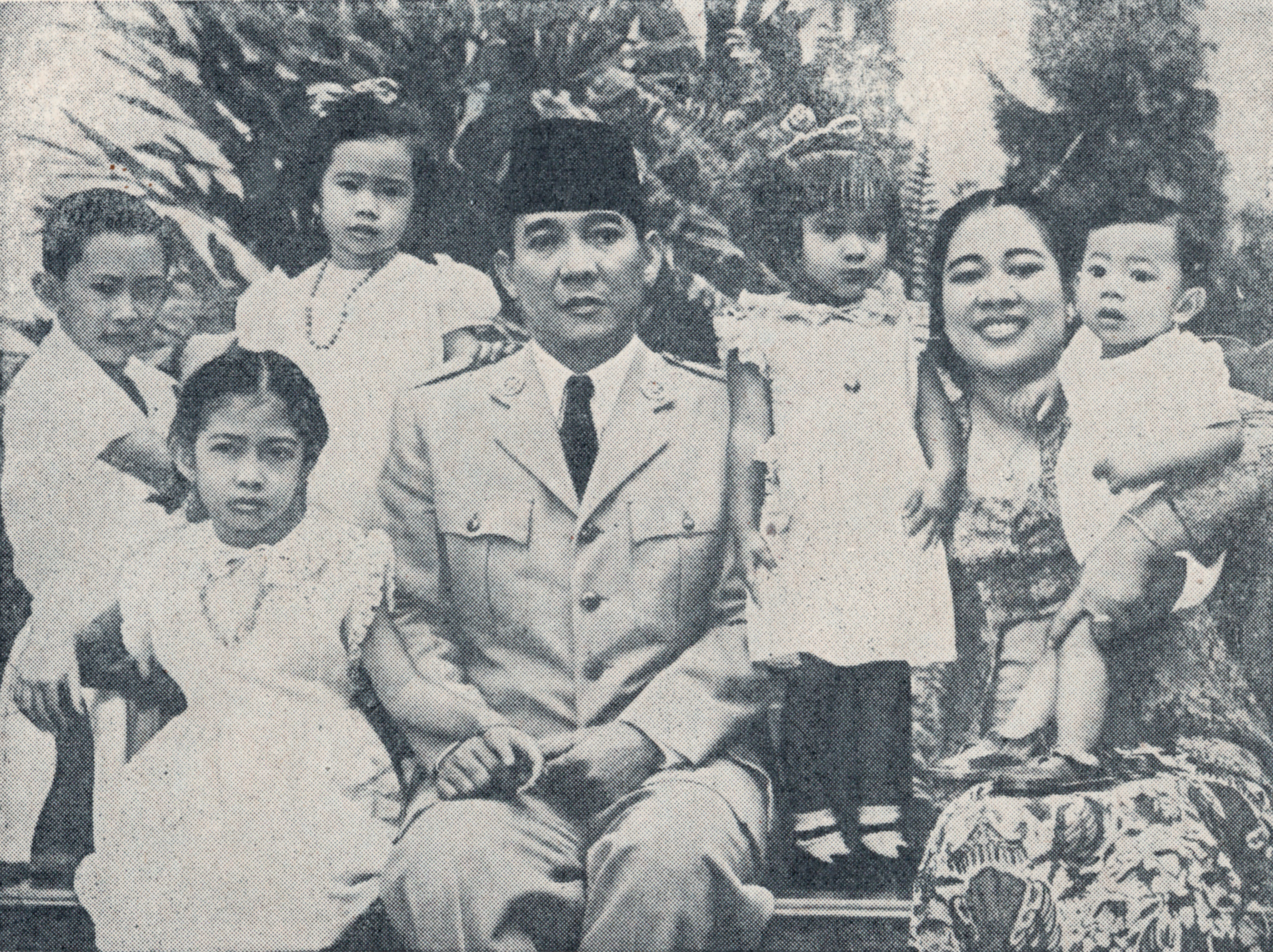
Sukarno family (ca. 1952)

- Sukarno (President of Indonesia, 1945–1967)
  - Megawati Sukarnoputri (eldest daughter of Sukarno; founder and chairman of Indonesian Democratic Party of Struggle, 1999–present; Vice President of Indonesia, 1999–2001; President of Indonesia, 2001–2004)
  - Taufiq Kiemas, 1942–2013 (third husband of Megawati; Speaker of the People’s Consultative Assembly, 2009–2013)
    - Puan Maharani (granddaughter of Sukarno, daughter of Megawati and Taufiq Kiemas; Coordinating Minister for Human Development and Cultural Affairs, 2014–2019; Speaker of People's Representative Council (2019–present)
  - Rachmawati Sukarnoputri (daughter of Sukarno; member of the Indonesian Presidential Advisory Council for Politics, 2007–2009; Vice Chairman of Gerindra Party, 2015–2021)
  - Sukmawati Sukarnoputri (daughter of Sukarno; chairman of Indonesian National Party Marhaenism, 1999–present – the party last contested in the 2009 legislative election)
    - Paundrakarna (grandson of Sukarno; son of Sukmawati; Member of Surakarta Regional House of Representatives, 2009–2011)
  - Guruh Sukarnoputra (son of Sukarno; member of the People's Representative Council from Indonesian Democratic Party, 1992–1996, and later from Indonesian Democratic Party of Struggle, 1999–present)
    - Puti Guntur Sukarno (granddaughter of Sukarno; daughter of Guntur Sukarnoputra; niece of Megawati; member of the People's Representative Council from Indonesian Democratic Party of Struggle, 2009–present; vice-gubernatorial candidate in the 2018 East Java gubernatorial election)

== The Sulaiman Family ==
- Andi Amran Sulaiman (Minister of Agriculture, 2014–2019 and again from 2023)
- Andi Sudirman Sulaiman (younger brother of Andi Amran Sulaiman; Vice Governor of South Sulawesi, 2018–2021; Acting Governor of South Sulawesi, 2021–2022; Governor of South Sulawesi 2022–2023)

== The Sumarno Family ==
- Soemarno, (economist; Minister of Central Bank Affairs, 1963; Finance Minister, 1962–1966; Governor of Bank Indonesia, 1960–1963; Coordinating Minister for National Development Planning Affairs, 1966)
  - Ari Hernanto Soemarno (son of Soemarno; engineer; CEO of Pertamina, 2006–2009)
  - Rini Mariani Soemarno (daughter of Soemarno; economist; Minister of Industry and Trade, 2001–2004; Minister of State Owned Enterprises 2014–2019)

== The Susilo Family ==
- Soesilo Soedarman, 1928–1997 (military; Indonesian Ambassador to the United States, 1986–1988; Minister of Tourism, Post and Telecommunications, 1988–1993; Coordinating Ministry for Political and Security Affairs, 1993–1997)
  - Dwisuryo Indroyono Soesilo (son of Soesilo Soedarman; Lecturer, Bureaucrat; Coordinating Minister of Maritime Affairs, 2014–2015)

== The Sutrisno–Ryacudu Family ==
- Try Sutrisno (army general, politician; Vice President of Indonesia)
  - Ryamizard Ryacudu (son-in-law of Try Sutrisno; Minister of Defense 2014–2019)
    - Syamsura Ryacudu (younger brother of Ryamizard Ryacudu; Governor of Lampung, 2008–2009; Vice Governor of Lampung 2004–2008)

== The Tahir Family ==
- Achmad Tahir, 1924–2002 (military; politician; Minister of Tourism, Post and Telecommunications, 1983–1988)
  - Linda Amaliasari (daughter of Achmad Tahir; Chairwomen of Indonesian Women's Congress, 2004–2009; Minister for Women's Empowerment and Child Protection, 2009–2014)
  - Adi Putra Darmawan Tahir (son of Achmad Tahir; member of People's Representative Council, 2004–2014)
  - Agum Gumelar (son-in-law of Achmad Tahir; husband of Linda Amaliasari; military; politician; Governor of National Resilience Institute 1998–1999; Minister of Transportation, 1999–2001, 2001–2004; Minister of Defense, 2001; Coordinating Minister of Coordinating Ministry for Political, Social and Security of Indonesia, 2001; chairman of Indonesian Football Association, 1999–2003 and National Sports Committee of Indonesia, 2003–2007; Member of the Presidential Advisory Council, 2018–2019)
- Rooslila Tahir Simanjuntak (wife of Achmad Tahir; journalist; member of People's Representative Council, 1982–1987)

== The Tanusudibyo Family ==
- Hary Tanoesoedibjo (businessman and Chairman of Perindo Party)
  - Angela Tanoesoedibjo (daughter of Hary Tanoesoedibjo; businesswoman and Vice Minister of Tourism and Creative Economy)

== The Wibowo–Yudhoyono Family ==
- Sarwo Edhie Wibowo, 1925–1989 (retired lieutenant general in the Indonesian Army and the fifth commander of the Army Para-Commando Regiment who played substantial role in crushing the 30 September Movement as well as the Indonesian Communist Party)
  - Hadi Utomo, 1945–2017 (son-in-law of Sarwo Edhie Wibowo, brother-in-law of Kristiani Herrawati; retired colonel in the Indonesian Army; member of the People's Representative Council, 2004–2009; Chairman of the Democratic Party, 2005–2010)
  - Kristiani Herrawati, 1952–2019 (third daughter of Sarwo Edhie Wibowo; the sixth First Lady of Indonesia; former Vice Chair of the Democratic Party)
  - Susilo Bambang Yudhoyono (son-in-law of Sarwo Edhie Wibowo, husband of Kristiani Herrawati; retired general in the Indonesian Army; founder of the Democratic Party; President of Indonesia, 2004–2014)
    - Agus Harimurti Yudhoyono (eldest son of Susilo Bambang Yudhoyono; former infantry major in the Indonesian Army, resigned to run for governorship of Jakarta in the 2017 Jakarta gubernatorial election; Chairman of the Democratic Party)
      - Aulia Pohan (father-in-law of Agus Harimurti Yudhoyono; Vice Governor of Bank Indonesia, 1999)
    - Edhie Baskoro Yudhoyono (youngest son of Susilo Bambang Yudhoyono; Secretary-General of the Democratic Party, 2010–2015; Member of the People's Representative Council from Democratic Party, 2009–present; married to the daughter of Hatta Rajasa, former chairman of the National Mandate Party and Coordinating Minister for Economic Affairs in Yudhoyono's cabinet who ran as vice-presidential candidate in the 2014 presidential election)
    - Indrata Nur Bayuaji (nephew of Susilo Bambang Yudhoyono; Regent of Pacitan, 2021–present)
  - Pramono Edhie Wibowo, 1955–2020 (son of Sarwo Edhie Wibowo; retired general in the Indonesian Army where he was Chief of Staff, 2011–2013; finished second in the presidential convention held by the Democratic Party in 2013)
  - Hartanto Edhie Wibowo (youngest son of Sarwo Edhie Wibowo; member of People's Representative Council from the Democratic Party, 2014–present)

== The Widodo Family ==
- Joko Widodo (businessman-politician; Mayor of Surakarta, 2005–2012; Governor of Jakarta, 2012–2014; President of Indonesia, 2014–2024)
  - Gibran Rakabuming Raka (businessman-politician; son of Joko Widodo; Mayor of Surakarta, 2021–2024; Vice President of Indonesia, 2024–present))
  - Kaesang Pangarep (businessman-politician; son of Joko Widodo; Chairman of the Indonesian Solidarity Party, 2023–present)
  - Bobby Nasution (businessman-politician; son-in-law of Joko Widodo; Governor of North Sumatra, 2024–present; Mayor of Medan, 2021–2024)
    - Inge Amelia Nasution (sister of Bobby Nasution; member of the North Sumatra Regional House of Representatives, 2014–2019)
    - Dahlan Hasan Nasution (uncle of Bobby Nasution; Regent of Mandailing Natal, 2014–2021; Vice Regent of Mandailing Natal, 2011–2014)
    - Herry Lontung Siregar (uncle of Bobby Nasution; Regent of South Tapanuli, 2000–2005)
- Anwar Usman (brother-in-law of Joko Widodo; Chief Justice of the Constitutional Court of Indonesia, 2018–2023; Deputy Chief Justice of the Constitutional Court of Indonesia, 2015–2018)
- Respati Ardi (distant relative; Mayor of Surakarta, 2025–current)

== The Zulkifli Family ==
- Zulkifli Nurdin, 1948–2018 (military officer; Governor of Jambi, 1994–1999, 2000–2005)
  - Zumi Zola Zulkifli (son of Zulkifli Nurdin; actor; Regent of East Tanjung Jabung, 2011–2016; Governor of Jambi 2016–2018)
