= Thomas Djiwandono =

Indonesian politician (born 1973)

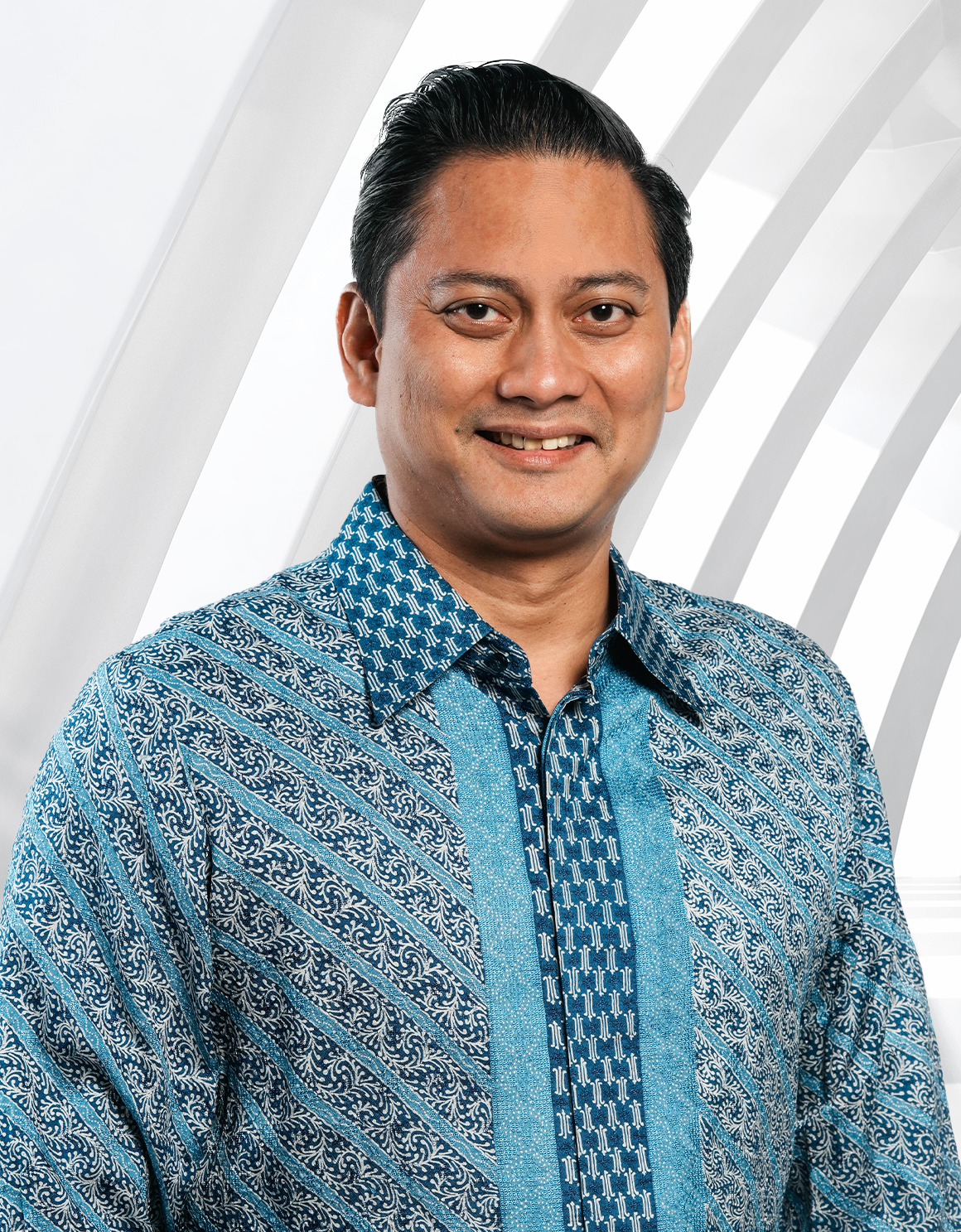
- Official portrait, 2024

Deputy Governor of Bank Indonesia
- Incumbent
- Assumed office 9 February 2026
- Preceded by: Juda Agung

11th Deputy Minister of Finance
- In office 18 July 2024 – 5 February 2026 Serving with Suahasil Nazara and Anggito Abimanyu (from 21 October 2024)
- President: Joko Widodo; Prabowo Subianto
- Minister: Sri Mulyani; Purbaya Yudhi Sadewa
- Preceded by: Suahasil Nazara (solely)
- Succeeded by: Juda Agung

1st General Treasurer of Gerindra
- In office 2008 – March 2025
- Chairman: Prabowo Subianto
- Preceded by: Position established
- Succeeded by: Satrio Dimas Adityo

Personal details
- Born: Thomas Aquinas Muliatna Djiwandono; 7 May 1973 (age 53) Jakarta, Indonesia
- Party: Gerindra
- Children: 3 children
- Parents: Sudradjad Djiwandono (father); Bianti Djiwandono (mother)
- Relatives: Budi Djiwandono (younger brother); Sudjati Djiwandono (paternal uncle); Prabowo Subianto (maternal uncle); Hashim Djojohadikusumo (maternal uncle)
- Education: Haverford College (BA); Johns Hopkins School of Advanced International Studies (MA)
- Occupation: Politician; businessman
- Nickname: Tommy

Thomas Aquinas Muliatna Djiwandono (born 7 May 1973) is an Indonesian politician and economist currently serving as Deputy Governor of Bank Indonesia. He is a nephew of Prabowo Subianto, the eighth president of Indonesia. He was also appointed as second deputy of minister of finance, serving under Sri Mulyani's and Purbaya Yudhi Sadewa's administration from July 2024 to February 2026.

== Early life and education ==
Thomas is born to Joseph Soedrajad Djiwandono and Biantiningsih Miderawati Djojohadikusumo. His father, Joseph, served as Governor of Bank Indonesia for 1993–1998 period, and lectured at Nanyang Technological University. His mother, Biantiningsih, is daughter of Sumitro Djojohadikusumo and elder sister of Prabowo Subianto. He is great-grandson of Margono Djojohadikusumo, Indonesian banker and first director of Bank Negara Indonesia.

He spent his youth in Jakarta, before moving to USA for college. He graduated from Haverford College as Bachelor of Arts in history in 1995 and later took his master's degree in economics from Johns Hopkins University, graduating in 2004.

== Early careers ==
Thomas interned as journalist, firstly at Tempo in 1993 and later Indonesian Business Weekly in 1994.

He later moved to Hong Kong and joined Wheelock NatWest (now part of Wheelock and Company) as Financial Analyst. In 2006, he returned to Indonesia permanently to become Deputy CEO of Arsari Group, an agricultural company established by his uncle, Hashim Djojohadikusumo.

== Political careers ==
Thomas joined as cadre of Gerindra Party, when his uncle Prabowo established it in 2008. In 2014, he become the party's treasurer and financial comptroller.

Following Prabowo's victory the 2024 election, he becomes a member of Prabowo's Presidential Transition Team. He is tasked to synchronize financial and economic policies for future Prabowo administration resulting in him working closely with Sri Mulyani for months after the election.

== Personal life ==
Thomas is a Catholic. He is married and had 3 children. Thomas was part of the entourage of four sent by President Prabowo Subianto to attend the funeral of Pope Francis, alongside Joko Widodo, Ignasius Jonan and Natalius Pigai.
