= Rahayu Saraswati =

Indonesian politician (born 1986)

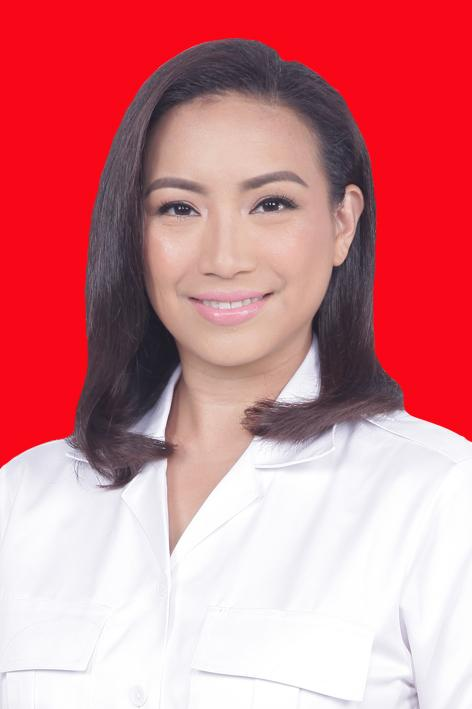
- Electoral portrait, 2018

Member of House of Representatives
- Incumbent
- Assumed office 1 October 2024
- Constituency: DKI Jakarta III
- Majority: 52,932 (2024)
- In office 1 October 2014 – 30 September 2019
- Constituency: Central Java IV

Chairperson of the Great Indonesia Shoots
- Incumbent
- Assumed office Unknown

Personal details
- Born: Rahayu Saraswati Dhirakarya Djojohadikusumo; 27 January 1986 (age 40) Jakarta, Indonesia
- Party: Gerindra
- Spouse: Harwendro Aditya Dewanto (m. 2014)
- Children: Narendra; Wira; Janissa
- Parents: Hashim Djojohadikusumo (father); Anie Hashim (mother)
- Relatives: Aryo Djojohadikusumo (older brother); Prabowo Subianto (paternal uncle); Sudradjad Djiwandono (uncle-in-law)
- Education: United World College of South East Asia
- Alma mater: Purdue University; University of Virginia; International School of Screen Acting
- Occupation: Politician; actress; activist

Rahayu Saraswati Dhirakarya Djojohadikusumo (born 27 January 1986) is an Indonesian activist, politician, actress, and presenter. Educated at Purdue University and the University of Virginia, she is currently a member of the Indonesian House of Representatives for the Gerindra Party for the 2024–2029 term and was also a member from 2014 to 2019. During her time as a member of the legislature, she fought for women and children right and against human trafficking.

After failing to secure re-election in 2019, she was selected by her uncle Prabowo, then minister of defense, to serve alongside him as the deputy chairperson of the Gerindra Party for the period 2020 to 2025. She took part in the 2020 Indonesian local elections as a vice-mayoral candidate of PDI-P's Muhamad for South Tangerang, but they were defeated by Benjamin Davnie. She ran again in the 2024 election and won a second term in the House of Representatives representing Jakarta's 3rd district.

She was subject to misogynistic ridicule online after a photo surfaced of her showing pregnant belly which she had posted in 2015. After hearing about it from Tsamara Amany, she stated that it was confusing and saddening to see the photograph was used to attack her for political gain.

== Family ==
Rahayu Saraswati Dhirakanya Djojohadikusumo was born on 27 January 1986 to Hashim Djojohadikusumo and Anie Hashim. Her last name was derived from her great-grandfather Raden Mas Margono Djojohadikusumo, founder of Bank Negara Indonesia. Her uncle, Prabowo Subianto, is the eighth president of Indonesia. She married Harwendro Aditya Dewanto in 2014 and has two sons and one daughter: Narendra, Wira, and Janissa.

== Filmography ==
Saraswati has starred in several action movies.

=== Movie ===
Year	Movie	Role	Info
2009	Merah Putih	Senja	
2010	Merah Putih II: Darah Garuda	Senja	
2011	Hearts of Freedom	Senja	Also as associate producer
2013	Dream Obama	Leticia	
2014	Hanyut	Taminah	Malaysian Film

=== Television ===
Year	Movie	Role	Info
2013–2015	Talk Indonesia	Co-host	With main host Dalton Tanonaka
