= Baharsjah =

Baharsjah is a surname. Notable people with the surname include:

- Sjarifuddin Baharsjah (1932-2021), Indonesian agricultural figure and academic, husband of Justika
- Justika Baharsjah (born 1937), Indonesian agronomist, educator and politician, wife of Sjarifuddin
