= Dora Marie Sigar =

Indonesian nurse, activist, and homemaker (191o–2008)

- Born: 21 September 1921; Minahasa Regency, North Sulawesi, Dutch East Indies
- Died: 22 December 2008 (aged 87); Singapore
- Burial place: Tanah Kusir Cemetery
- Occupations: Nurse; activist; homemaker
- Known for: Mother of Prabowo Subianto
- Spouse: Sumitro Djojohadikusumo (m. 1945; died 2001)
- Children: 4, including Prabowo Subianto and Hashim Djojohadikusumo
- Parents: Philip Laurens Sigar (father); Cornelie Maengkom (mother)
- Relatives: Sudradjad Djiwandono (son-in-law); Siti Hediati Hariyadi (daughter-in-law)

Dora Marie Sigar (21 September 1921 – 22 December 2008) was an Indonesian nurse, activist and homemaker. She was best known for being the mother of Prabowo Subianto, the eighth president of Indonesia.

== Early life ==
Sigar was born on 21 September 1921 in Langowan, Minahasa Regency, as the daughter of Philip Frederik Laurens Sigar (1885–1946), a government official and member of Volksraad, and Cornelie Emilia Maengkom (1888–1946). They both came from bureaucratic families. Sigar was of mixed Minahasan and German descent.

== Education ==
At the age of 12, Sigar moved to the Netherlands to continue her education at the Christelijk Hogere Burgerschool in Utrecht. She already showed her intelligence at a young age. There, she studied post-surgical nursing and became active in student activities advocating for Indonesian rights, shaping her outlook as an educated and dedicated woman.

== Career ==
Sigar met with Sumitro Djojohadikusumo, an economist, during a meeting organized by the Indonesia Christen Jongeren (lit. 'Indonesian Christian Students') in 1945. He then became her patient after undergoing colon surgery due to tumor. In 1943, Sumitro returned to Indonesia, and Sigar followed a year later. They married on 7 January 1945 and had four children. After she had returned to Indonesia, Sigar became a homemaker and focused on her family, supporting her husband's career as an economist and political figure. When Sumitro served in the cabinet, Sigar became the backbone of the family, especially when her husband became a fugitive due to alleged political and economic cases.

== Personal life ==
Sigar married Sumitro Djojohadikusumo on 7 January 1945 in Matraman, East Jakarta, and had two sons, Prabowo Subianto (born 1951), a politician who served as the eighth president of Indonesia, and Hashim Djojohadikusumo (born 1953), a businessman; and two daughters, Biantiningsih Miderawati Djiwandono (born 1946) and Maryani Ekowati Lemaistre (born 1948). They faced serious political challenges in post-independence Indonesia but their marriage lasted happily until Sumitro's death on 9 March 2001.

== Death ==
Sigar died at Mount Elizabeth Hospital in Singapore at the age of 89 on 22 December 2008 after being hospitalized for a year due to old age and lymphoma. She was buried at Tanah Kusir Cemetery on 25 December.
