= Budi Djiwandono =

Indonesian politician (born 1981)

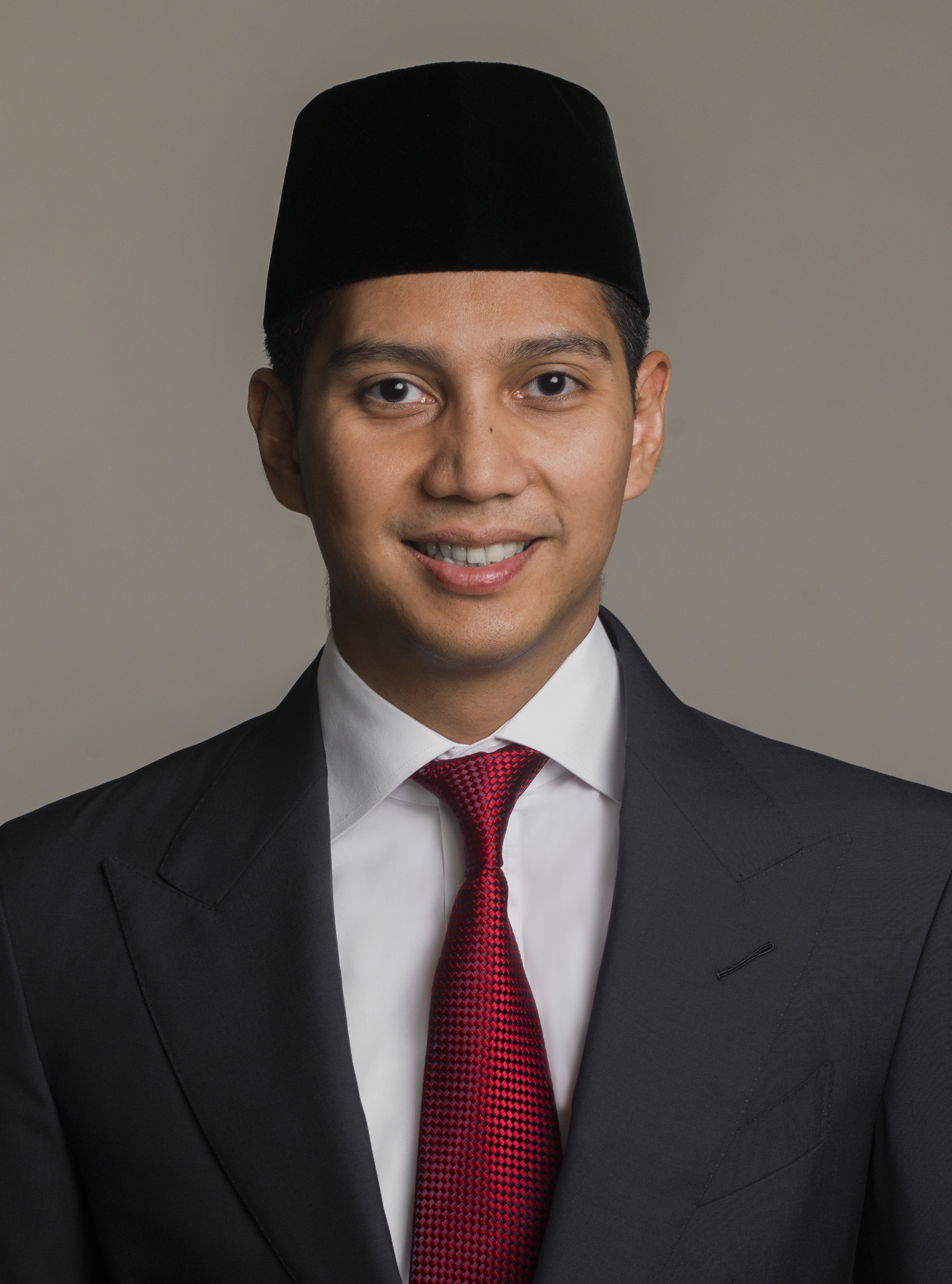
- Official portrait, 2022

Deputy Chairman of the Commission I of the House of Representatives of Indonesia
- Incumbent
- Assumed office 2024 Serving with Utut Adianto, Ahmad Heryawan, Anton Sukartono, Dave Akbarshah Fikarno Laksono, and Hasan Aminuddin
- Leader: Utut Adianto

Member of House of Representatives
- Incumbent
- Assumed office 24 August 2017; Interim until 30 September 2019
- Preceded by: Luther Kombong
- Constituency: East Kalimantan
- Majority: 131,569 (2024)

Personal details
- Born: G. Budisatrio Djiwandono; 25 September 1981 (age 44) Jakarta, Indonesia
- Party: Gerindra
- Spouse: Ludmilla Sumiskum (m. 2023)
- Parents: Sudradjad Djiwandono (father); Bianti Djiwandono (mother)
- Relatives: Thomas Djiwandono (older brother); Sudjati Djiwandono (paternal uncle); Prabowo Subianto (maternal uncle); Hashim Djojohadikusumo (maternal uncle)
- Education: Berkshire School; Clark University (BA)
- Occupation: Politician; businessman

G. Budisatrio Djiwandono (born in Jakarta, 25 September 1981), commonly known as Budi Djiwandono, is an Indonesian politician currently serving as the Chairman of the Gerindra Party Faction in the House of Representatives of the Republic of Indonesia (DPR RI) since 2024. He also holds the position of Deputy Chairman of Commission I of the DPR RI, overseeing matters related to Defense, Foreign Affairs, Intelligence, and Communications & Informatics.

Previously, he served as the Deputy Secretary of the Gerindra Faction (2019–2024) and the Deputy Chairman of Commission IV of the DPR RI (2019–2024), which focuses on agriculture, forestry, environment, marine, and fisheries.

Djiwandono, who is the nephew of Indonesian president Prabowo Subianto, has held a key strategic role as Deputy Chairman of the Central Executive Board (DPP) of the Gerindra Party since 2018.

== Early life and education ==
Gerardus Budisatrio Djiwandono was born on 25 September 1981 in Jakarta, Indonesia, the younger son of J. Soedradjad Djiwandono (born 1938) and Biantiningsih Djojohadikusumo (born 1946). His father is an economist who has served as Governor of Bank Indonesia during the New Order era. His mother is the eldest sister of Prabowo Subianto. He has an older brother, Thomas Djiwandono, who is also a politician from the Gerindra Party and currently serves as the Deputy Minister of Finance of Indonesia.

Djiwandono received his early education at the Saint Theresia and Pelita Harapan schools in Indonesia, and later on at the Berkshire School in Sheffield, Massachusetts. While at Berkshire, he was a member of the men's squash team. He pursued higher studies at Clark University in Worcester, graduating with a Bachelor of Arts degree in government and international relations in 2004.

== Political career ==
Budi Djiwandono began his legislative career as a Member of the House of Representatives of the Republic of Indonesia (DPR RI) through an interim replacement (Pergantian Antarwaktu, PAW) process, succeeding Luther Kombong, who died in June 2017. As the second-highest vote-getter in the 2014 legislative election with 31,846 votes, Budi was entitled to replace Luther following the PAW procedure. He was officially inaugurated as a DPR RI member on August 24, 2017.

In the 2019–2024 legislative period, Budi was re-elected as a DPR RI member representing the Gerindra Party Faction from the East Kalimantan electoral district, securing 71,207 votes. During this term, he also served as Deputy Chairman of Commission IV of DPR RI, overseeing agriculture, forestry, fisheries, and food security.

In the 2024 legislative election, Budisatrio Djiwandono was re-elected for the 2024–2029 term, again representing East Kalimantan, with a significantly increased vote count of 131,569 votes. Following his inauguration on October 1, 2024, he was entrusted with the position of Chairman of the Gerindra Party Faction in DPR RI, with Bambang Haryadi as Faction Secretary and Novita Wijayanti as Faction Treasurer. In this term, Budi was also appointed as Deputy Chairman of Commission I of DPR RI, responsible for defense, foreign affairs, intelligence, technology, and communications.

=== His Political and Legislative Journey ===
Budisatrio Djiwandono has had a distinguished legislative career since he was entrusted with the position of Deputy Chairman of Commission IV of DPR RI in his second term (2019–2024), where he played a key role in formulating strategic policies related to food security, natural resource management, marine affairs, fisheries, and environmental sustainability.

Beyond his responsibilities in Commission IV, Budi Djiwandono actively contributed to various parliamentary bodies that influence national policymaking. He served as a Member of the DPR RI Deliberation Board (Badan Musyawarah) from 2019 to 2024 and participated in several special committees addressing critical legislative matters. Notably, he was involved in the Special Committee on the Relocation of the Capital City (2021–2022), contributing to the formulation of regulations for the transfer of Indonesia's capital to Nusantara. In the maritime and border sector, he was also part of the Working Committee on the Continental Shelf Bill (2021–2023), which governs Indonesia's maritime sovereignty. His dedication to environmental issues was further demonstrated when he was appointed Chairman of the Working Committee on the Conservation of Biodiversity and Ecosystems Bill (2022–2024), a strategic initiative aimed at preserving ecosystems and ensuring environmental sustainability.

Budi Djiwandono's contributions extend beyond national policymaking into parliamentary diplomacy. In 2018, he joined the Inter-Parliamentary Cooperation Agency (BKSAP) of DPR RI, strengthening Indonesia's international relations through legislative diplomacy. Additionally, he played a role in formulating policies to boost economic growth, serving as Chairman of the Gerindra Party Faction's Group in the Special Committee for the National Entrepreneurship Law.

His leadership within the DPR RI continued to grow, earning him broader responsibilities in the 2024–2029 legislative term. He was re-elected and entrusted with the Chairmanship of the Gerindra Party Faction in DPR RI, a strategic position in shaping the party's legislative direction. Furthermore, he was appointed as Deputy Chairman of Commission I of DPR RI, overseeing matters related to defense, intelligence, foreign affairs, and communications. With his extensive experience across multiple sectors, Budisatrio Djiwandono remains a key figure in drafting, supervising, and overseeing national policies for the benefit of the people and Indonesia's development.

== Business career ==
Prior to his political career, Budisatrio Djiwandono built extensive experience in the business sector, holding various strategic positions, including President Commissioner of PT Karunia Tidar Abadi, Director of PT Kertas Nusantara, President Director of PT Nusantara Pandu Energi, Commissioner of PT Satrio Putra Tidar, and Deputy President Director of PT Nusantara Energy. His combined expertise in business and politics underscores his significant role in both legislative affairs and the management of strategic industries in Indonesia.

== Organizational involvement ==
Budisatrio Djiwandono has an extensive background in organizational leadership, spanning politics, economics, sports, and agriculture. His political career began with his involvement in the Gerindra Party, where he has held various strategic positions. From 2008 to 2020, he served as Chairman of Investment and Capital Markets Affairs at the Central Executive Board (DPP) of the Gerindra Party, playing a key role in shaping economic policies and developing Indonesia's capital market. Over time, his leadership within the party strengthened, leading to his appointment as Deputy Chairman of the Gerindra Party's Central Executive Board (DPP) in 2018 and later as a Member of the Gerindra Party's advisory board for the 2020–2025 term. Additionally, he was entrusted with the role of Chairman of Agricultural Affairs at the DPP Gerindra (2020–2025), highlighting his commitment to the agricultural sector and national food security.

Beyond his political engagements, Budisatrio has played a significant role in youth organizations. From 2008 to 2016, he served as Deputy Chairman of the Central Executive Board of Tunas Indonesia Raya (TIDAR), the youth wing of the Gerindra Party, which focuses on political education and leadership development for young Indonesians. Furthermore, he has been actively involved in economic organizations, serving as deputy chairman for Natural Resource & Infrastructure Management and Legislative Relations at the Indonesian Chamber of Commerce and Industry (KADIN) since 2021. In this capacity, he has contributed to bridging the gap between the business sector and legislative policies, particularly in the management of natural resources and infrastructure development in Indonesia. Beyond his political engagements, Budisatrio has played a significant role in youth organizations. From 2008 to 2016, he served as Deputy Chairman of the Central Executive Board of Tunas Indonesia Raya (TIDAR), the youth wing of the Gerindra Party, which focuses on political education and leadership development for young Indonesians. Furthermore, he has been actively involved in economic organizations, serving as Deputy Chairman for Natural Resource & Infrastructure Management and Legislative Relations at the Indonesian Chamber of Commerce and Industry (KADIN) since 2021. In this capacity, he has contributed to bridging the gap between the business sector and legislative policies, particularly in the management of natural resources and infrastructure development in Indonesia. In addition to his contributions to politics and economics, Budisatrio has been actively involved in advancing the agricultural and sports sectors. Since 2021, he has held the position of Chairman of the Indonesian Youth Farmers Association (Pemuda Tani Indonesia), an organization dedicated to empowering young farmers and enhancing the productivity of Indonesia's agricultural sector. His involvement in sports, particularly basketball, has also been notable. From 2015 to 2016, he served as Treasurer-General of the Indonesian Basketball Association (PERBASI) before being appointed as Secretary-General of PERBASI for the 2016–2019 term. In 2024, Budisatrio was elected as Chairman of PERBASI, reaffirming his commitment to developing basketball in Indonesia.

== Personal life ==
Budi was a Catholic. On 3 December 2023, Budi officially converted to Islam under the guidance of the Grand Imam of the Istiqlal Mosque, Nasaruddin Umar. Budi officially married Ludmilla Sumiskum on 29 December 2023.
