= Aryo Djojohadikusumo =

Indonesian politician (born 1983)

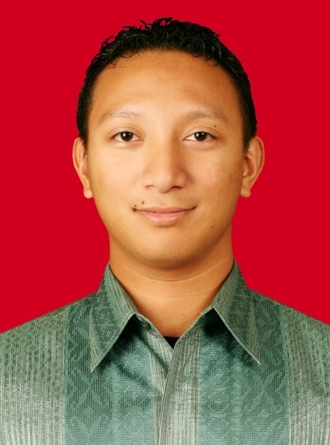
- Official portrait, 2011

Member of House of Representatives
- In office 1 October 2014 – 30 September 2019
- Constituency: DKI Jakarta III
- Majority: 53,268 (2014)

Personal details
- Born: Aryo Puspito Setyaki Djojohadikusumo; 25 April 1983 (age 43) Jakarta, Indonesia
- Party: Gerindra
- Spouse: Sachi Sophia (m. 2018)
- Parents: Hashim Djojohadikusumo (father); Anie Hashim (mother)
- Relatives: Rahayu Djojohadikusumo (younger sister); Prabowo Subianto (paternal uncle); Sudradjad Djiwandono (uncle-in-law)
- Education: Winchester College; Durham University
- Occupation: Politician; businessman

Aryo Puspito Setyaki Djojohadikusumo (born 25 April 1983) is an Indonesian politician of the Gerindra Party who served as a member of the People's Representative Council between 2014 and 2019. He is a nephew of Indonesian president Prabowo Subianto.

== Early life and family ==
Aryo Puspito Setyaki Djojohadikusumo was born in Jakarta on 25 April 1983, the first child of Hashim Djojohadikusumo. He studied business at the University of Durham, and had before taken a semester studying archaeology. In total, he spent 12 years studying in the United Kingdom.

He married Sachi Sophia in August 2018.

== Career ==
After graduating from university, Aryo founded a company in 2007 with some friends, and he became its CEO. The company operated in various fields, but by 2008 Aryo and his friends joined his father's company which was expanding in Indonesia. He became a commissioner at Hashim's Arsari Group. Aryo is also CEO of Arsari Tambang, the group's mining arm which operates tin mines.

Outside of business, Aryo also joined the newly established Gerindra, which was founded in 2008 by his father and his uncle Prabowo Subianto, becoming the chairman of its youth wing — though not formally so until 2011. In 2012, he was also appointed as one of the party's deputy secretaries general.

=== Legislature ===
Aryo ran in the 2014 Indonesian legislative election for Jakarta's 3rd electoral district. He won 53,268 votes and secured a seat at the People's Representative Council. He became a member of the body's seventh commission on Energy, Research and Technology, and the Environment.

During Joko Widodo's presidency, he criticized the appointment of Badrodin Haiti as police chief in 2015, saying that it damaged the fight against corruption. In 2016, he also criticized the Provincial Government of Jakarta under Basuki Tjahaja Purnama for removing property tax, noting that the removal of the revenue source would jeopardize funding for other projects and commenting that the move was made for political reasons.

Aryo also became part of a special committee assessing the creation to limit the production and consumption of alcohol. He did not run for reelection in 2019.

=== Sport ===
Aryo Djojohadikusumo serves as the General Chair of the Central Board of the Equestrian Association of Indonesia (Pordasi) for the 2024–2028 period.
