= Makarim =

Makarim is a surname and given name. Notable people with the name include:

surname

- Nadiem Makarim (born 1984), Indonesian politician and businessman
- Nabiel Makarim (1945–2021), Indonesian politician
- Rayya Makarim (born 1974), Indonesian screenwriter, producer, director, and actress

given name

- Makarim Wibisono (1947), Indonesian diplomat
