= Uteng Suryadiyatna =

Indonesian politician (1942–2023)

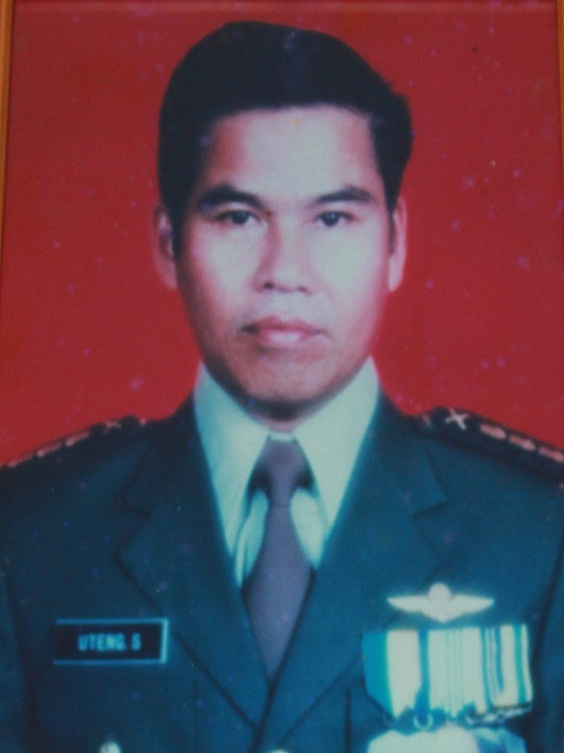

Vice Governor of Jambi
- In office 11 July 1996 – 2001 Serving with Hasip Kalimuddin Syam
- Governor: Abdurrahman Sayoeti; Zulkifli Nurdin
- Preceded by: Musa
- Succeeded by: Antony Zeidra Abidin

Personal details
- Born: 10 November 1942
- Died: 20 August 2023 (aged 80) Bandung, West Java, Indonesia
- Spouse: Azizah Suryadiyatna

Military service
- Allegiance: Indonesia
- Branch/service: Indonesian Army
- Years of service: 1965–1999
- Rank: Brigadier general
- Unit: Infantry

Uteng Suryadiyatna (10 November 1942 – 20 August 2023) was an Indonesian military officer and politician who served as the vice governor of Jambi from 1996 to 2001.

== Early life and military career ==
Uteng was born on 10 November 1942. He attended the National Military Academy after graduating from high school and received his commission as an army second lieutenant from the infantry corps in 1965. Uteng began his career as a company commander in the 327th Infantry Battalion.

Uteng gradually rose through the ranks and became a colonel in the Indonesian Army. He was assigned to the Army Territorial Education Center in Bandung as the unit's commander from 1991 until 1994. On 1 October 1996, he was promoted to the rank of brigadier general.

== Vice governor of Jambi ==
Uteng became the vice governor of Jambi on 11 July 1996. He was installed alongside three other vice governors, who were career bureaucrats. He was assigned the portfolio of economy and development by Abdurrahman Sayoeti, the governor at that time.

As vice governor, Uteng led the government in facing several major issues in Jambi. In regard to illegal logging, Uteng encouraged forest police in the region to conduct regular patrols on the Trans-Sumatra Highway. As the scale of illegal logging grew larger, the governor formed the Timber Processing Industry Control Team in late 2000, which was led by Uteng. The team was tasked to take inventory of all wood processing industries in the region as well as the capacity of each equipment owned by the industry.

In 1999, around 700 transmigrant palm oil farmers in Jambi, Indonesia, demanded an increase in the price of palm oil and a deferral of credit and interest cuts. They stayed overnight at the governor's office. Uteng and several Jambi officials brokered a deal between the protesters and the government. The farmers' demands were met after the deal was made and they left the governor's office.

=== Scouting movement ===
Aside from his position as vice governor, Uteng was also involved in the local scouting (Pramuka) movement. He was elected as the chairman of Jambi's Pramuka from 1996 to 1998. He was investigated in October 2013 for the embezzlement of funds in Jambi's Pramuka treasury during his chairmanship. Further investigation in early 2014 was canceled due to Uteng's health condition.

=== Nomination and succession ===
After the 1999 Indonesian legislative election in June 1999, there were speculations about the succession to the governor's seat, which was to be vacant in December. Several names, including Uteng, were nominated for governor. However, Uteng became largely unpopular among councilors due to a lack of vision. Furthermore, a group of students protested against his nomination as he was not a native of Jambi.

Uteng's five-year term as vice governor expired in 2001 and his position was not filled until four years later. His wife, Azizah Suryadiyatna, who was a councillor in Jambi's legislative body, sought to receive recommendation from the Golkar party as vice governor. She only received 1,25 percent of votes in the party's convention. Azizah was later elected as a senator for Jambi in the 2014 Indonesian legislative election.

== Later life and death ==
Upon retiring from politics, Uteng became a commissioner at a state plantation company.

Uteng died at the Al-Ihsan Hospital in Bandung, on the morning of 20 August 2023. He was 80. The incumbent governor of Jambi, Al Haris, who was his former aide-de-camp, delivered his condolences.
