= Juda Agung =

Indonesian economist (born 1964)

- Juda Agung in 2026

14th [[Deputy Minister of Finance]]
- Incumbent
- Assumed office 5 February 2026 Serving with Luky Alfirman; Nurkholisoh Ibnu Aman
- President: Prabowo Subianto
- Minister: Suahasil Nazara
- Preceded by: Thomas Djiwandono

Deputy Governor of Bank Indonesia
- In office January 6, 2022 – January 19, 2026
- Preceded by: Sugeng
- Succeeded by: Thomas Djiwandono

Personal details
- Born: August 16, 1964 (age 62) Pontianak, West Kalimantan, Indonesia
- Children: 3
- Education: Institut Pertanian Bogor; Birmingham University

Juda Agung (born August 16, 1964) is an Indonesian economist, who currently serves as Deputy Minister of Finance since February 2026. He previously served as Deputy Governor of Bank Indonesia from January 2022 to January 2026 and Member of the Board of Commissioners of the Financial Services Authority (OJK), since September 23, 2025. Previously, he was Assistant to the Governor of Indonesia for Financial System Stability and Macroprudential Policy.

== Life ==
Juda Agung was born in Pontianak, West Kalimantan, on August 16, 1964. After completing his high school in Surakarta, Central Java, he pursued his higher education at the Institut Pertanian Bogor, majoring in Agricultural industrial engineering, Faculty of Agricultural Technology, until he graduated in 1987. After earning his bachelor's degree, he continued his education at the University of Birmingham, concentrating in Money, Banking and Finance (Monetary, Finance and Bank), and from that campus he also succeeded in obtaining a master's degree in 1995 with the title "distinction". Then he continued his education at the University of Birmingham in the field of Economics, until he obtained his doctorate in 1999 with a dissertation title "Financial Deregulation and Monetary Policy in Indonesia". He also took executive education at several universities: Harvard University, University of Virginia Darden School of Business, Kellogg School of Business, Northwestern University, Kiel University, and Hitotsubashi University.

== Career ==
His career began with his first assignment at Bank Indonesia as a staff member in the Economic and Monetary Policy Department. From 1992 to 1993, he served as a research assistant at the Central Planning Bureau in the Netherlands. After returning from a three-year study assignment at the University of Birmingham, he served as a junior economic researcher at the Directorate of Economic Research and Monetary Policy from 1999 to 2002.

He then worked as an economic researcher at the Directorate of Economic Research and Monetary Policy from 2002 to 2003. From 2003 to 2006, he served as a staff member to the Governor Bank Indonesia. He returned to the Directorate of Economic Research and Monetary Policy as Head of Section in the Directorate of Economic Research and Monetary Policy from 2008 to 2012.

From 2012 to 2013, he served as Advisor to Economics and Monetary Policy, and from 2013 to 2014, he became Group Head of the Directorate of Economic Research and Monetary Policy. In February 2014, Bank Indonesia Governor Agus Martowardojo appointed him Head of the Department of Economic & Monetary Policy.

Juda Agung also served as Head of the Bank Indonesia Representative Office in West Java. On January 1, 2020, he was promoted to Assistant Governor of Bank Indonesia for Financial System Stability and Macroprudential Policy. Effective January 6, 2022, he was officially inaugurated as Deputy Governor of Bank Indonesia before the Chief Justice of the Supreme Court of the Republic of Indonesia.

== Publication ==
- Managing monetary and financial stability in a dynamic global environment: Bank Indonesia s policy perspectives. Bank for International Settlement (BIS), 2016. (co: Solikin M Juhro, Harmanta and Tarsidin).
- Sustainable Economic Growth: Challenges and Policy Strategy”, in Growth Diagnostic: Growth Strategy to Support Structural Reform in Indonesia, Juda Agung, Edimon Ginting, Solikin M. Juhro, and Yoga Affandi (Eds.), Bank Indonesia and Asian Development Bank (ADB), March 2016.
- Pattern of Corporate Financing and Financial System, Review of International Economics, Vol 12, No. 44, 2004 (co-author: A.W. Mullineux, and V. Murinde)
- Monetary Transmission Mechanism in Indonesia, Bank Indonesia, May 2002, ISBN 979-3363-10-X (co-author: Perry Warjiyo).
- Towards Implementation of Inflation Targeting in Indonesia. Bulletin of Indonesian Economic Studies, pp 309–324, Dec 2001 (co-author: Halim Alamsyah, Charles Joseph, Doddy Zulverdy).
- Credit Crunch in Indonesia in the Aftermath of the Crisis. Bank Indonesia, 2000.(co-authors: Bambang Pramono, Nugroho Joko Prastowo, Andri Prasmuko).
- Financial Constraint, Firms' Investments and the Channels of Monetary Policy in Indonesia. Applied Economics, Applied Economics. Vol. 31, No. 13, 2000.
- The Money Multiplier for Broad Money, Divisia Money, and Innovation (Liberalisation) Adjusted Divisia Money: A Cointegration and ECM Study for Taiwan, 1969 to 1996. RISEC: International Review of Economics and Business, December 1999, 46(4), pages 725–49. (co author: James Ford)
- Financial deregulation and the bank lending channel in developing countries: the case of Indonesia, Asian Economic Journal, 1998
- One Divisia Money for Europe. Applied Economics, Vol 29, No. 6, 1997. (co author: Leigh Drake, Andy Mullineux).
- Incorporating Risky Assets in Divisia monetary Aggregates. University of Birmingham Discussion Paper 1997 (co author: Leigh Drake, Andy Mullineux).
- Convergence of European Financial System: Banks or Equity Market? In Spatial Dynamic of European Integration. 1999. (co-author: A.W. Mullineux, and V. Murinde)
- Convergence between the Financial System of EU Members and Applicant of Transition Economies. In Financial And Monetary Integration In The New Europe (co-author: A.W. Mullineux, and V. Murinde)
- Managing Capital Flood. Jakarta Post, 20 October 2010.
