= Rachmat Witoelar =

Indonesian politician

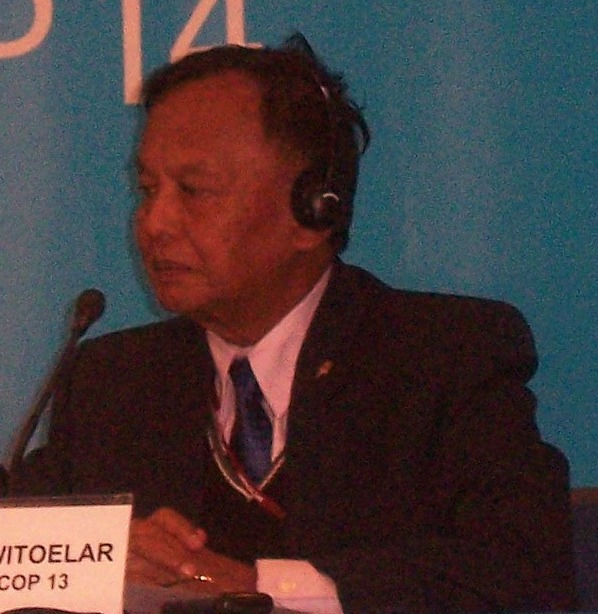
- Witoelar in 2008 UN Climate Conference

Minister of Environment
- In office 21 October 2004 – 20 October 2009
- President: Susilo Bambang Yudhoyono
- Preceded by: Nabiel Makarim
- Succeeded by: Gusti Muhammad Hatta

Ambassador of Indonesia to Russia, Kazakhstan, Mongolia, and Turkmenistan
- In office 1993–1997
- President: Soeharto
- Preceded by: Janwar Marah Djani
- Succeeded by: Tjahjono

Member of People's Representative Council
- In office 1971–1993
- Constituency: West Java

Personal details
- Born: 2 June 1941 (age 85) Tasikmalaya, Dutch East Indies
- Party: Golkar
- Spouse: Erna Witoelar
- Relations: Wimar Witoelar (brother)
- Children: 3
- Education: Bandung Institute of Technology
- Profession: Diplomat; Politician

Rachmat Nadi Witoelar Kartaadipoetra or Rachmat Witoelar (born 2 June 1941 in Tasikmalaya, West Java) is a politician who has served as the State Minister of Environment of Indonesia in 2004–2009.

Witoelar graduated with a degree in architecture from the Bandung Institute of Technology (ITB) in 1970. In 1971, he became a Member of Parliament representing the ruling party, Golkar. He was re-elected four times. In 2004, he became an active member of the campaign team of presidential candidate Susilo Bambang Yudhoyono. When Yudhoyono was elected president, Witoelar was appointed State Minister of Environment.

Rachmat has held various positions in the House of Representatives, including chairman of House Commission V and Commission VI. He was also Golkar Party secretary-general from 1988 to 1993. He served as Indonesian ambassador to Russia and Mongolia from 1993 to 1997.

Witoelar is married to Erna Witoelar. They have three sons. Witoelar was also elected as the president of Thirteenth United Nations Framework Climate Change Conference (UNFCCC 2007) which was held in Bali, Indonesia.

Preceded by Nabiel Makarim	State Minister of Environment of Indonesia; 2004–2009	Succeeded by Gusti Muhammad Hatta
