= Zulkifli Nurdin =

Indonesian politician and military officer

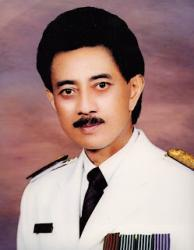

Governor of Jambi
- In office August 3, 2005 – August 3, 2010
- Preceded by: Sudarsono Harjosukarto (acting)
- Succeeded by: Hasan Basri Agus
- In office December 10, 1999 – December 10, 2004
- Deputy: Uteng Suryadiyatna; Hasip Kalimuddin Syam
- Preceded by: Abdurrahman Sayoeti
- Succeeded by: Sudarsono Harjosukarto (acting)

Personal details
- Born: March 28, 1948; Muara Sabak, present-day East Tanjung Jabung Regency, Jambi
- Died: 28 November 2018 (aged 70); South Jakarta, Jakarta, Indonesia
- Spouse(s): Harmina Djohar (1978–1994); Ratu Munawaroh (1997–2018)

Zulkifli Nurdin (March 28, 1948 – November 28, 2018) was an Indonesian politician and military officer. He served as the governor of Jambi for two terms from 1999 until 2004 and again from 2005 until 2010. Nurdin is the father of Zumi Zola, the former governor of Jambi from 2016 until 2018, when Zola was convicted of corruption.

Nurdin was born on March 28, 1948, in Muara Sabak, East Tanjung Jabung Regency, in what became the Indonesian province of Jambi.

He served as Governor of Jambi from 1999 until 2004, when he resigned from office to seek re-election to a second term. He won re-election to a second gubernatorial term, which he served from 2005 until 2010.

Nurdin died on at 8 a.m. on November 28, 2018, at Pondok Indah Hospital in the Pondok Indah neighborhood of South Jakarta at the age of 70 due to complications of diabetes. His son, suspended Jambi Governor Zumi Zola, who was on trial for corruption at the time of his father's death, was granted temporary permission to leave prison to attend Nurdin's funeral. Nurdin was buried at a family cemetery in Jambi City on Thursday, November 29, 2018.
