= Erna Witoelar =

Indonesian politician

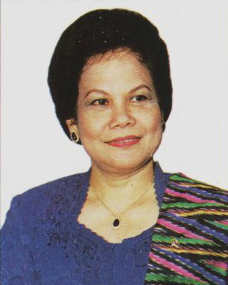

Minister of Human Settlements and Regional Development
- In office 29 October 1999 – 23 July 2001
- President: Abdurrahman Wahid
- Preceded by: Theo L. Sambuaga
- Succeeded by: Soenarno

Personal details
- Born: 6 February 1947 (age 79) Near Lake Tempe, Indonesia
- Spouse: Rachmat Witoelar

Erna Witoelar (née Walinono; born 6 February 1947) is an Indonesian politician who was Minister of Human Settlements and Regional Development from 1999 to 2001.

== Life ==
Andi Erna Anastasjia Walinono was born near Lake Tempe in 1947.

She has been a UN Special Ambassador for the Millennium Development Goals and she sits on the board of various international and Indonesian committees and the International Institute for Sustainable Development. She is married to Rachmat Witoelar and they have three sons.

Witoelar is the former co-chair of Earth Charter International Council.
