= Nabiel Makarim =

Indonesian politician (1945–2021)

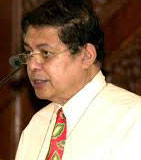
Nabiel Makarim as State Minister of the Environment

Nabiel Makarim (9 November 1945 – 22 October 2021) was Indonesia's Minister of the Environment and Forestry from 2001 to 2004.

== Early life ==
Makarim graduated from Harvard Kennedy School at Harvard University, where he received his Master of Public Administration (MPA) in 1984. Makarim also received his master's degree in Management (MBA) from the Sloan Fellows program of the MIT Sloan School of Management in 1985.

== Career ==
As minister, Makarim developed the Good Environmental Governance (GEG) program, which rates the environmental performance of cities and local environmental agencies. Makarim has spent most of his professional life in the environmental field; however, he was one of eleven members of the Indonesian Commission for Business Supervision (KPPU) that was appointed by the President in June 2000.

From 1990 to 1999, he was the Deputy of Pollution Control for the Indonesian Environmental Protection Agency (Bapedal). In 1995, Makarim created and launched the Program for Pollution Control, Evaluation and Rating (PROPER) to collect and disseminate information about the environmental performance of leading private-sector polluters.

Makarim worked for Harvard Institute for International Development (HIID) as a policy analyst from 1986 to 1989. At the same time, he also taught a graduate level economics course at the University of Indonesia (UI) in 1986 to 1989. He was the Assistant Minister of Environment from 1989 to 1992 in the office of the Ministry of the Environment.

== Personal ==
Makirim died on 22 October 2021 in his home in South Jakarta. He was buried the following day in the Kalibata Heroes' Cemetery in South Jakarta.

Preceded by Sonny Keraf	State Minister of Environment of Indonesia; 2001–2004	Succeeded by Rachmat Witoelar
