= Sjarifuddin Baharsjah =

Indonesian agricultural figure and academic (1931–2021)

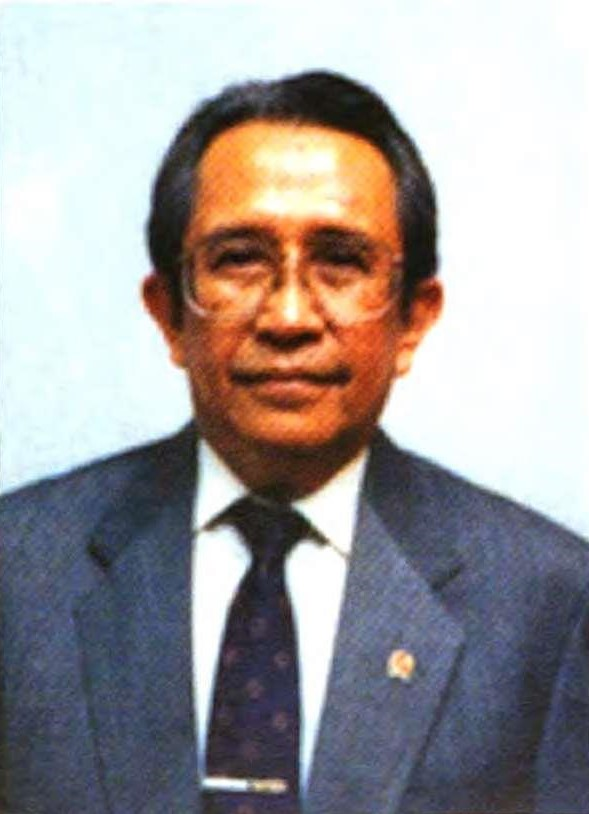

Member of the People's Consultative Assembly
- In office 1 October 1997 – 1 October 1999
- President: Suharto; B. J. Habibie
- Constituency: North Sumatra

Minister of Agriculture
- In office 17 March 1993 – 14 March 1998
- President: Suharto
- Preceded by: Wardojo
- Succeeded by: Justika Baharsjah

Junior Minister of Agriculture
- In office 23 March 1988 – 17 March 1993
- President: Suharto
- Preceded by: Sjech Marhaban
- Succeeded by: Bayu Krisnamurthi

Personal details
- Born: 16 May 1932 Cirebon, West Java, Dutch East Indies
- Died: 15 January 2021 (aged 88) Jakarta, Indonesia
- Party: Golkar
- Spouse: Justika Baharsjah (m. 1962)

Sjarifuddin Baharsjah (16 May 1932 – 15 January 2021) was an Indonesian agricultural figure and academic from the Bogor Agricultural Institute (IPB). He served as Minister of Agriculture of Indonesia and Independent Chairman of the Food and Agriculture Organization (FAO) Council.

== Early life and education ==
Sjarifuddin Baharsjah was born on 16 May 1932 in Cirebon, West Java, to Sutan Pangeran Baharsyah and Siti Fatimatul Zahra. His father, Sutan Pangeran Baharsyah, was a descendant of Sultan Tangkal Alam Bagagar, the last king of the Pagaruyung Kingdom. The second of four children in a Muslim family, he had a sister named Leila Chairani Budiman and two brothers. According to his sister, Sjarifuddin was forced to learn female dances during his childhood because his mother said that "he was really pretty".

Sjarifuddin graduated from high school in 1952. He then continued his studies at the Agricultural Economics Faculty of the University of Indonesia and graduated in 1960 with an engineer degree (Ir.). He studied at the University of Kentucky and graduated with a Master of Science degree in 1965. He then pursued a PhD in the North Carolina State University, which he obtained in 1973.

== Career ==
=== Academic career ===
After his graduation from the University of Indonesia, Sjarifuddin taught at the IPB University. Sjarifuddin was promoted to professor in 1984.

=== Political career ===
Sjarifuddin began his career in the Department of Agriculture as the Head of the Research and Development Bureau for Agricultural Economics in 1977. He held the office for six years until he became the Secretary General of the department from 1983 until 1988. On 23 March 1988, President Suharto appointed him as the Junior Minister of Agriculture in the Fifth Development Cabinet. He was re-appointed in the Sixth Development Cabinet on 17 March 1993 as the Minister of Agriculture. Sjarifuddin ended his term after the formation of the Seventh Development Cabinet on 14 March 1998 and he was replaced by his wife, Justika Baharsjah.

Sjarifuddin was also appointed as a member of the People's Consultative Assembly representing Golkar from the North Sumatra province. He was inaugurated on 1 October 1997 for a five-year term, but ended it on 1 October 1999 due to political reformation.

Sjarifuddin became the Independent Chairman of the Food and Agriculture Organization (FAO) Council for the periods of 1997–1999 and 1999–2001.

== Personal life ==
Sjarifuddin was married to Justika in 1962. The couple had two children, Gita Indah Sari and Antin.

== Death ==
Sjarifuddin died at 00:12 WIB on 15 January 2021 in Pondok Indah Hospital, Jakarta.

== Bibliography ==
- Tim Penerbit (1996), Profil Tokoh, Aktivis dan Pemuka Masyarakat Minang [Who's Who of Minang People] (in Indonesian), Jakarta and Padang: PT Permo Promotion, Bina Prestasi Minang Indonesia, HEAD Infomarko Padang, ISBN 9789798931000
- The Editors (April 1993), "The Sixth Development Cabinet Announced March 17, 1993", Indonesia, 55, archived from the original on 13 January 2023
- Malley, Michael (April 1998), "The 7th Development Cabinet: Loyal to a Fault?" (PDF), Indonesia, 65 (65): 155–178, doi:10.2307/3351408, hdl:1813/54137, JSTOR 3351408
