= Justika Baharsjah =

Indonesian agronomist, educator and politician (born 1937)

Justika Sjarifudin Baharsjah

25th Minister of Social Affairs
- In office May 23, 1998 – 20 October 1999
- President: B. J. Habibie
- Preceded by: Siti Hardiyanti Rukmana
- Succeeded by: Bachtiar Chamsyah

21st Minister of Agriculture
- President: Soeharto
- Preceded by: Sjarifuddin Baharsjah
- Succeeded by: Soleh Solahudin

Personal details
- Born: 7 May 1937 (age 89) Cianjur, Priangan Residency, Dutch East Indies
- Party: Golkar
- Spouse: Sjarifuddin Baharsjah (m. 1962, d. 2021)
- Children: 2
- Education: Bogor Agricultural Institute; University of Kentucky; Cornell University

Justika Sjarifudin Baharsjah (born 7 May 1937) is an Indonesian agronomist, educator and politician. She has served as Minister of Agriculture and Minister of Social Affairs.

== Family ==
Baharsjah was born on 7 May 1937 in Cianjur, Priangan Residency, Dutch East Indies, to a farming family. She married Sjarifuddin Baharsjah in 1962.

== Education ==
Justika graduated from Bogor High School in 1956. She studied at Bogor Agricultural Institute (IPB) in Indonesia, University of Kentucky in the United States and Cornell University in the United States.

== Career ==
Baharsjah is an expert on agronomy and agro-climatology. She has worked as a researcher at the Environmental Protection Agency (EPA) and has lectured at the Bogor Agricultural Institute and Mercu Buana University. In 1993, she was appointed as leader of the Indonesian Agronomy Association.

Baharsjah was appointed as 21st Minister of Agriculture from March to May 1998, succeeding her husband to the post. She was then appointed as 25th Minister of Social Affairs in the Development Reform Cabinet, holding the office from May 1998 to October 1999.

Baharsjah has been awarded the Bintang Jasa Pratama [id] (1997) and the Mahaputera Adipradana Star [id] (1999).
