= Hashim Djojohadikusumo =

Indonesian entrepreneur and politician (born 1953)

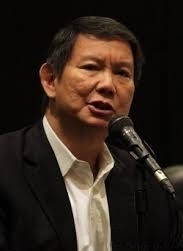
- Hashim Djojohadikusumo, c. 2010s
- Born: Hashim Sujono Djojohadikusumo; 5 June 1953 (age 73); Jakarta, Indonesia
- Education: Pomona College (BA)
- Occupations: Politician; businessman
- Known for: Founder of Arsari Group
- Political party: Gerindra
- Spouse: Anie Djojohadikusumo
- Children: 3, including Aryo and Rahayu
- Parents: Sumitro Djojohadikusumo (father); Dora Marie Sigar (mother)
- Relatives: Prabowo Subianto (older brother); Sudradjad Djiwandono (brother-in-law)

Hashim Sujono Djojohadikusumo (born 5 June 1953) is an Indonesian entrepreneur and politician who is the younger brother of Indonesian president Prabowo Subianto. In 2014, he was considered a billionaire. As of December 2020, Forbes estimates his net worth at $800 million.

Hashim studied in Europe from primary school to high school, before continuing his higher education at Pomona College, where he majored in political science and economics.

== Early life and education ==
Born in Jakarta, Indonesia on 5 June 1953 and hails from a distinguished family, he is the youngest son of Sumitro Djojohadikusumo, an ethnic Javanese from Kebumen, Central Java, the author of the economic plan for the New Order era and Dora Marie Sigar, a Protestant Christian of Minahasan descent, who originated from the Maengkom family in Langowan, North Sulawesi. His grandfather was one of the founders of Bank Negara Indonesia, Margono Djojohadikusumo. Hashim Djojohadikusumo is the younger brother of Prabowo Subianto.

Hashim studied in Europe from primary school to high school, before continuing his higher education at Pomona College, where he majored in political science and economics.

== Business career ==
In the beginning, Hashim Djojohadikusumo interned in a French investment bank as a financial analyst. He then continued his path towards the business world in becoming the director of Indo Consulting. Due to his rising development in the industry and business aspect, he then took acquisition of PT. Semen Cibinong through his company, PT. Tirta Mas. After that, he started investing his shares in Bank Niaga and Bank Kredit Asia and became a conglomerate. The 1997 Asian financial crisis led to Hashim's stay in London for 9 years to be able to focus on his business. It was during that time his business progressed and spread. His successes led him back to Indonesia to save his brother's business, Kiani Kertas that was wrapped in a Rp 1.9 trillion (US$150 million) debt with Bank Mandiri. Up to this day, Prabowo's company is owned by Hashim.

After successfully saving Prabowo's company, Hashim Djojohadikusumo also achieved control over the concession of forestry land, around 39 hectares (97 acres), in Central Aceh. The concession pushed him to expand his business to reach 12,000 square kilometres (3 million acres) of plantations, forest concessions, coal mines, and oil & gas fields ranging from Aceh to Papua. As of 2014, he was considered a billionaire. As of December 2019, Forbes estimates his net worth at $800 million, making him one of Indonesia's 50 wealthiest individuals.

== Philanthropy ==
Hashim has devoted the past twenty years to a variety of pressing social issues in Indonesia. He is the founder of the Arsari Djojohadikusumo Foundation, which was established in honor of his late father, Professor Sumitro Djojohadikusumo, a former Indonesian economist who helped develop the country's modern economy. The Foundation funded The Sumitro Djojohadikusumo Center for Emerging Economies in Southeast Asia (SDCEESEA) at the Center for Strategic and International Studies. The SDCEESEA conducts research on U.S.-Indonesia relations and Southeast Asia. It includes a proactive program to promote deeper understanding and closer relations between the United States and Southeast Asia.

The Arsari Foundation has been collaborating with the Gadjah Mada University since 2007. In 2018 the foundation announced it would provide scholarships to students and lecturers in order to help the university advance the preservation of Javanese culture. Hashim was listed as a Hero of Philanthropy by Forbes Asia in 2011 due to his foundation's ongoing contribution to the preservation of Indonesian heritage.

Other notable achievements include: the backing of programs to save the orangutan and honey bears of Kalimantan (Borneo), and the welfare of the wild elephant population of Sumatra. He is a board member of the Institute for the Preservation of the Indonesian Heritage (Badan Pelestarian Pusaka Indonesia) and the Indonesian Shadow Puppeteers Association (PEPADI). He became the chairman for the Indonesian Chess Association (Percasi) in 2010. Hashim's other interests include equestrian sports, and he is a founding member of the polo association in Indonesia.

== Columnist ==
Since early 2014, Hashim has been selected to write an occasional column for the Huffington Post.

== Controversies ==
Hashim Djojohadikusumo has been linked to various controversies. In 2002, Hashim Djojohadikusumo was arrested after, allegedly, misusing funds for bailing out collapsed and failed banks, including Hashim's banks, in the BLBI (Liquidity Assistance of Bank of Indonesia).

Hashim Djojohadikusumo is the subject of a tax dispute in Geneva. The tax authorities ask him to pay a tax debt of CHF131 million, which has not yet been paid. Hashim Djojohadikusumo claims that he bankrupted himself by financing the political campaigns of his brother, Prabowo Subianto.

== Personal life ==
Hashim is married to Anie Hashim Djojohadikusumo, with whom he has 3 children: Aryo Puspito Setyaki Djojohadikusumo, Rahayu Saraswati Dhirakanya Djojohadikusumo, and Siti Indrawati Djojohadikusumo. Hashim is a convert to Christianity.
