= J. Soedjati Djiwandono =

Indonesian political scientist

- Born: Johannes Baptista Soedjati Djiwandono; 13 October 1933
- Died: 9 January 2013 (aged 79)
- Education: Victoria University of Wellington; University of Otago; London School of Economics (MSc and PhD)
- Occupation: Political scientist
- Political party: Golkar
- Parent: Thomas Djiwandono (father)
- Relatives: Sudradjad Djiwandono (younger brother)

Johannes Baptista Soedjati Djiwandono (13 October 1933 – 9 January 2013) was an Indonesian political scientist who helped found the Centre for Strategic and International Studies (CSIS) in Jakarta, one of Indonesia's leading think tanks.

== Education ==
After attending a teachers' training college at his hometown of Yogyakarta, Djiwandono received a Colombo Plan scholarship from the New Zealand government to study at the English Language Institute at Victoria University of Wellington. After studying for one year in Wellington, Djiwandono studied Russian and political science at the University of Otago in Dunedin in the South Island. His return to Indonesia in January 1966 coincided with the tumultuous transition to the New Order. After completing his undergraduate studies in New Zealand in October 1965, Djiwandono later completed a MSc and PhD in international relations at the London School of Economics.

== Career ==
One of his best known studies was Konfrontasi Revisited, which explored Indonesian-Soviet relations during Indonesia's “Confrontation” campaigns against West New Guinea and Malaysia. Besides helping to establish the CSIS in 1971, he later served as a Senior fellow at the Research Institute for Democracy and Peace in Indonesia. In addition, Djiwandono served as a member of the People's Representative Council and worked for the United Nations Secretary General's Advisory Board on Disarmament Matters. In addition, Djiwandono was a vocal human rights advocate, critic of Suharto's New Order, and a regular contributor to Indonesia's leading English newspaper, The Jakarta Post.

== Family ==
Paradoxically, although he was very critical of Suharto, Djiwandono was indirectly related to the president. Soedjati Djiwandono's brother was former Bank Indonesia governor, J. Soedradjad Djiwandono, who is married to Biantiningsih Djojohadikusumo. She is the elder sister of the well-known military and political figure Prabowo Subianto who was married to Suharto's daughter Titiek for a time from 1983 to 1998.
