= J. Soedradjad Djiwandono =

Indonesian economist

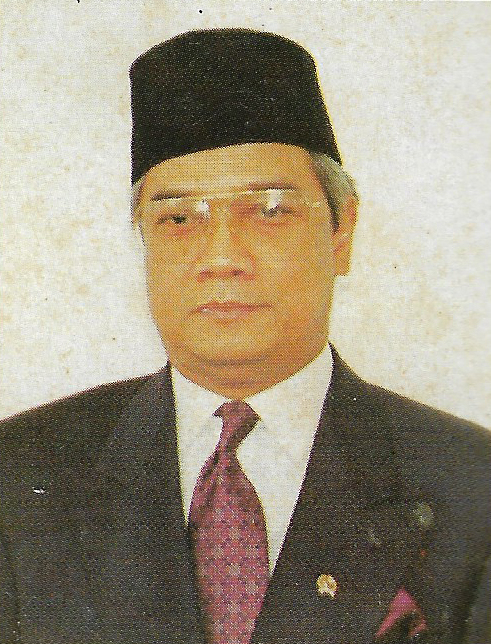
- Official portrait, 1993

10th Governor of Bank Indonesia
- In office March 1993 – February 1998
- President: Suharto
- Preceded by: Adrianus Mooy
- Succeeded by: Syahril Sabirin

Personal details
- Born: Joseph Soedradjad Djiwandono; 7 August 1938 (age 88) Djokjakarta, Dutch East Indies
- Party: Gerindra (since 2015)
- Other political affiliations: Golkar (1993–1998); Independent (1998–2015)
- Spouse: Bianti Djojohadikusumo (m. 1971)
- Children: Thomas; Budi
- Parent: Thomas Djiwandono (father)
- Relatives: Sudjati Djiwandono (older brother); Sumitro Djojohadikusumo (father-in-law); Prabowo Subianto (brother-in-law); Hashim Djojohadikusumo (brother-in-law)
- Education: Gadjah Mada University; University of Wisconsin–Madison (MSc, MA); Boston University (PhD)
- Occupation: Economist; businessman

Joseph Soedradjad Djiwandono (EYD: Sudrajad Jiwandono, also written Sudrajad Djiwandono, Soedradjat Djiwandono and Sudrajat Djiwandono; born 7 August 1938) is an Indonesian economist who was the Governor of Bank Indonesia, the nation's central bank, from 1993 until his sudden dismissal in 1998.

Djiwandono received his bachelor's degree in economics from Gadjah Mada University in 1963 and went on to receive a Ph.D. from Boston University in 1980. Prior to accepting the position as Governor of Bank Indonesia in 1993, Djiwandono had expressed his concern about the high number of bad debts in the banking sector to President Suharto.

== Career ==
Soedradjad Djiwandono held a wide range of economic positions, both outside of and within government, before becoming Governor of Bank Indonesia in 1993. His main positions included the following:

- Professor at the S. Rajaratnam School of International Studies, a Graduate School of Nanyang Technological University, Singapore
- Researcher, Institute of Economics and Social Research, Indonesian Institute of Sciences (LIPI)
- Lecturer, and later Emeritus Professor, Department of Economics, University of Indonesia
- Bureau Head, National Development Planning Agency (Bappenas)
- Special Assistant to the Minister of Trade
- Assistant Minister, Coordinating Ministry of Economics, Trade and Industry
- Junior Minister for Trade

== Asian financial crisis ==
The Asian financial crisis began to affect Indonesia by mid-1997. On 14 August, Bank Indonesia followed Thailand and Malaysia and moved to float the Indonesian rupiah. Under Djiwandono, the bank's "market-oriented response" to the crisis was praised by investors. However, it was also criticized for allowing Indonesia's banking system to grow too fast with 239 banks in establishment by September 1997. Of these banks, 16 were liquidated in November. Djiwandono later defended the decision not to close more banks citing concerns that "had more banks been liquidated, a total collapse [of the banking sector] may have resulted".

He was dismissed from office by Suharto's 11 February 1998 presidential decree but was not officially informed of the decision until six days later. Although no reason was given, economists believed Djiwandono's opposition to a new fixed exchange rate system for the rupiah contributed to the decision for his dismissal. The decision drew criticism from the International Monetary Fund and United States President Bill Clinton and placed a US$43 billion aid package at risk of being reversed. He was succeeded by Syahril Sabirin in a transfer ceremony on 19 February.

== Career since leaving office ==
On 7 May 2002, Djiwandono was named a suspect in the investigation of former Bank Indonesia governors. He was charged with abuse of authority by extending Rp19 trillion (US$2.1 billion) in loans to failing banks between 1996 and 1998. Several years earlier, Djiwandono had defended the central bank's policies from allegations by three former finance ministers that it misunderstood the government's policies and improperly used the liquidity assistance program during the financial crisis. He remained free while various investigations of the approach of former Bank Indonesia governors was undertaken.

Djiwandono continues to contribute to public policy debate, especially in Indonesia, by writing articles including op-ed pieces about current economic issues, particularly about matters involving monetary policy.

== Personal life ==
Soedradjad, a Catholic, is married to Bianti, daughter of Sumitro Djojohadikusumo, one of Indonesia's most well-known economists and policy-makers. He is thus connected by marriage to two of Sumitro's sons: Prabowo Subianto, who is the eighth president of Indonesia, and Hashim Djojohadikusumo, a prominent business figure in Indonesia. Soedradjad and Bianti have two sons: Thomas Djiwandono (born 7 May 1973) and Budi Djiwandono (born 25 September 1981).

He had at least one brother, J. Soedjati Djiwandono. Also a Catholic, he died in 2013.

== Publications ==
- Djiwandono, J. Soedradjad. (2000). Bank Indonesia and the Recent Crisis. Bulletin of Indonesian Economic Studies, 36(1). pp. 47–72.
- Djiwandono, J. Soedradjad (2005). Bank Indonesia and the Crisis: An Insider's View. Singapore: Institute of Southeast Asian Studies. ISBN 978-981-230-308-0.

Government offices
Preceded by Adrianus Mooy	Governor of Bank Indonesia; 1993–1998	Succeeded by Syahril Sabirin
