= Margono Djojohadikusumo =

Indonesian politician and banker

Raden Mas Margono Djojohadikusumo
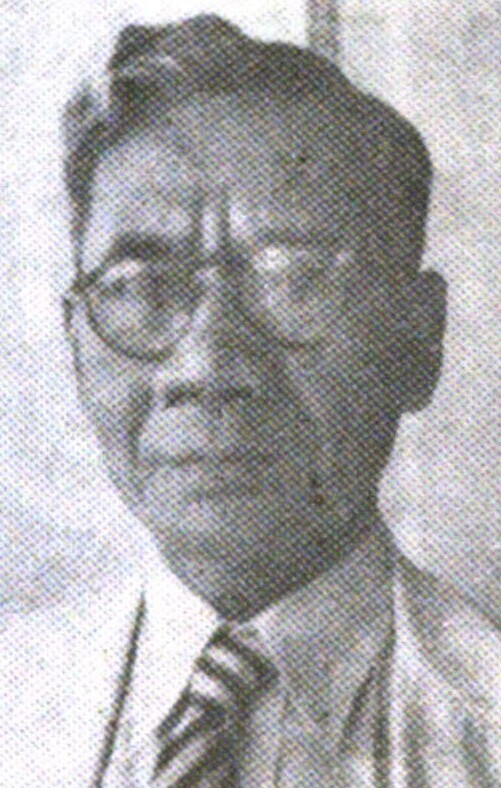
- Margono Djojohadikusumo, c. 1952

President of Bank Negara Indonesia
- In office 5 July 1946 – October 1953
- Preceded by: Position established
- Succeeded by: Abdoel Kareem Pringgodigdo

Chair of Supreme Advisory Council
- In office 25 September 1945 – 6 November 1945
- President: Sukarno
- Deputy: Agus Salim
- Preceded by: Position established
- Succeeded by: Wiranatakusumah V

Personal details
- Born: 16 May 1894 Banjoemas, Dutch East Indies
- Died: 25 July 1978 (aged 84) Jakarta, Indonesia
- Resting place: Banyumas, Central Java
- Party: Parindra
- Spouse: Siti Katoemi Wirodihardjo (m. 1915)
- Children: 5, including Sumitro Djojohadikusumo
- Parent: Raden Tumenggung Mangkuprodjo (father)
- Occupation: Politician; banker
- Known for: Member of BPUPK; Founder of BNI

Raden Mas Margono Djojohadikusumo (16 May 1894 – 25 July 1978) was an Indonesian politician and banker. He was the founder and the first president of Bank Negara Indonesia, and was also a member of the Investigating Committee for Preparatory Work for Independence (BPUPK). He was also the paternal grandfather of Indonesian President Prabowo Subianto. He was also the first member of the Supreme Advisory Council.

== Early life and education ==
Margono was born on 16 May 1894 in Banyumas. His father was part of the Javanese aristocracy, and served in the colonial civil service's district government and in its courts. The family was descended from a nobleman who had fought against the Dutch during the Java War. Furthermore his lineage also can be traced back to R. Joko Kaiman who was known being the founder of Banyumas and its first regent. Margono described his family as "impoverished" aristocracy, and noted that while he was the sixth child, all his elder siblings died as children. According to Margono, he never visited his ancestor's grave as the latter had disavowed any of his descendants who worked for the Dutch. He began studying at an Europeesche Lagere School (colonial elementary school) in 1901, and after graduating in 1907 he continued his studies at an Opleiding School Voor Inlandsche Ambtenaren (OSVIA; civil servant school for native Indonesians) in Magelang until 1911.

== Career ==
After graduating from OSVIA, Margono became a civil servant within the police department. He then joined the Dutch People's Credit Service (Volkscredietwezen) in 1917, taking a course in Batavia to become an adjutant inspector in 1921. He was assigned to Madiun and Malang before being placed as an inspector in Batavia by 1927. While working at the credit agency, Margono was for a time assigned to Europe at the Ministry of the Colonies in Den Haag between 1937 and 1938. Margono attended the Co-operative Congress in 1938 as part of this assignment, representing the Dutch East Indies. During the Japanese occupation, Margono worked in the occupation government's interior ministry, within its co-operatives department. He was also appointed into the Investigating Committee for Preparatory Work for Independence.

Following the proclamation of Indonesian independence, Margono was appointed as Chairman of the Supreme Advisory Council on 25 September 1945 until he resigned two months later. Wanting to form an Indonesian national bank, Margono initially approached Deputy Finance Minister Surachman Tjokroadisurjo with a proposal to form one. However, Tjokroadisurjo turned him down, preferring to nationalize the colonial central bank De Javasche Bank instead of creating a new bank. Margono then went to Vice President Mohammad Hatta, who approved and signed off on his proposal. Margono then travelled to cities in Java to raise funding for the new bank, and also secured money from a public fund supporting Indonesian independence. He recruited staff for the new bank, and established a location in Jakarta before relocating to Yogyakarta due to increased Dutch presence in Jakarta. The bank was chartered as Bank Negara Indonesia (BNI) on 5 July 1946, Margono becoming its first president.

Margono was briefly imprisoned by Dutch forces following Operation Kraai in 1948. After his release, he participated as part of the Indonesian delegation in the Dutch–Indonesian Round Table Conference until he was replaced by his son Sumitro Djojohadikusumo. Within independent Indonesia, Margono was appointed into the Provisional People's Representative Council as a member of the Great Indonesia Party. He also served as president of the State Industrial Bank since its founding in 1951 until he was replaced as president of both BNI and the industrial bank in October 1953.

== Later life ==
Due to Sumitro's involvement in the Revolutionary Government of the Republic of Indonesia, Margono was forced into exile abroad along with the rest of his family, only returning after the fall of Sukarno in 1966. He published his memoir, titled Reminiscences from 3 Historical Periods: A Family Tradition Put in Writing, in 1973. The memoir was dedicated to two of his sons, Subianto and Sujono, who were killed in the Lengkong incident in 1946. His older daughter, Sukartini Djojohadikusumo, was born in 1919 and became an Indonesian centenarian in 2019. Margono died in Jakarta on 25 July 1978, and was later buried at the Djojohadikusumo family grave in Banyumas Regency.

== Honours ==
A building in Gadjah Mada University (UGM) was named after him as the naming decision was agreed upon by faculty members and Margono's grandson, Hashim Djojohadikusumo. The building is used by the Faculty of Humanities within UGM. His name is also used as a street name in Jakarta.

His biography is an inspiration for the Indonesian film, Merah Putih.

Much to popular belief that it was named after him, Margono Hospital which is located in Purwokerto, Banyumas, Central Java is not named after him, but rather after another person with the same name, Margono Sukarjo. Margono Sukarjo is the first practicing surgeon in Indonesia.

Numerous grassroot organization in Indonesia had petitioned the government of Indonesia to award Margono Djojohadikusumo as National Hero of Indonesia. He was officially awarded the title on 10 November 2026 by President of Indonesia Prabowo Subianto, his grandson.
