= Gerindra Party =

Political party in Indonesia

Great Indonesia Movement Party Partai Gerakan Indonesia Raya
- Abbreviation: Gerindra
- General Chairman: Prabowo Subianto
- Secretary-General: Sugiono
- DPR group leader: Budi Djiwandono
- Founders: Prabowo Subianto; Fadli Zon; Hashim Djojohadikusumo; Suhardi; Muchdi Purwopranjono
- Founded: 6 February 2008 (18 years, 286 days)
- Split from: Golkar
- Headquarters: Jakarta
- Youth wing: TIDAR (Great Indonesia Bud)
- Women's wing: PIRA (Great Indonesia Women)
- Muslim wing: GEMIRA (Great Indonesia Muslim Movement)
- Christian wing: GEKIRA (Great Indonesia Christian Movement)
- Hindu-Buddhist wing: GEMA SADHANA (Sanatana Dharma Nusantara Society Movement)
- Labour wing: SEGARA (Great Indonesia Labor Movement Center)
- Membership (2024): 495,699
- Ideology: Pancasila; Indonesian nationalism Anti-communism; National conservatism Protectionism; National liberalism Pancasila economics State capitalism Ultranationalism; Militarism; Expansionist nationalism Faction: Economic liberalism
- Political position: Far-right
- National affiliation: Advanced Indonesia Coalition Former: Onward Indonesia Coalition; (2019–2023); Just and Prosperous Indonesia Coalition; (2018–2019); Red-White Coalition; (2014–2018); Mega-Prabowo (PDI-P Coalition); (2009–2014)
- Slogan: Kompak, Bergerak, Berdampak (Compact, Moving, Impactful)
- Anthem: Hymne Partai Gerindra (Gerindra Party Hymn); Mars Partai Gerindra (Gerindra Party March)
- Ballot number: 2
- DPR seats: 86 / 580 (15%)
- DPRD I seats: 323 / 2,372 (14%)
- DPRD II seats: 2,120 / 17,510 (12%)

Website
- gerindra.id

The Great Indonesia Movement Party (Indonesian: Partai Gerakan Indonesia Raya ['partaɪ gəˈrakan indo'nesija raˈja]), better known as the Gerindra Party (Indonesian: [gəˈrindra]), is a nationalist, right-wing populist political party in Indonesia. Since 2014, it has been the third-largest party in the House of Representatives (DPR), having won 86 seats in the latest election. It currently controls the presidency and is part of the ruling government. Gerindra is led by former army general and current president Prabowo Subianto.

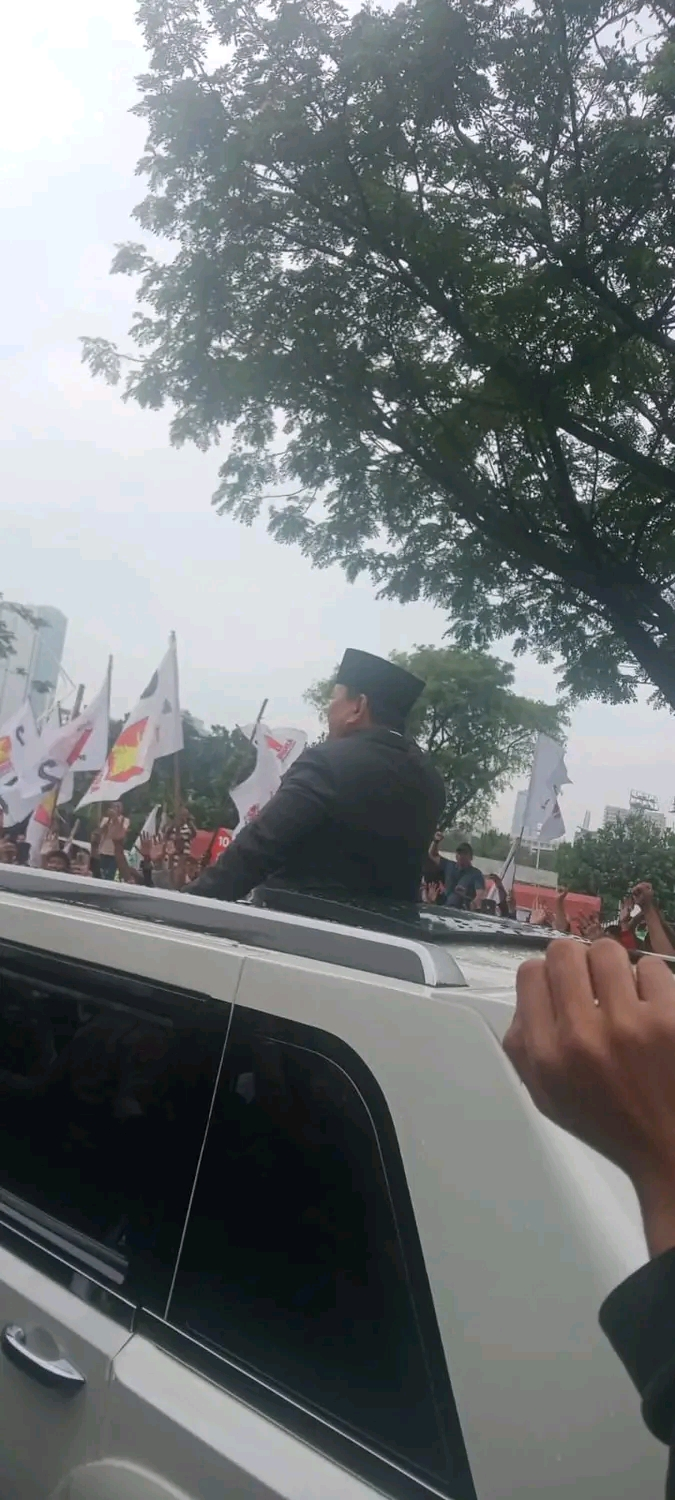
Prabowo Subianto meets with Gerindra Party supporters.

Founded in 2008, Gerindra serves as the political vehicle for Prabowo. The party first participated in the 2009 legislative election and secured 26 seats in the DPR. In the presidential election, Prabowo ran as the vice-presidential candidate for Megawati Soekarnoputri of PDI-P, but they were defeated by the incumbent president, Susilo Bambang Yudhoyono (SBY). Gerindra then became the opposition to the SBY administration. In 2014, Gerindra placed third in the legislative election, and Prabowo ran with Hatta Rajasa against Joko Widodo (Jokowi) in the presidential election, but they lost. Gerindra once again became the opposition to the government. In the 2019 legislative election, Gerindra won the second-highest majority of votes. Prabowo ran with Sandiaga Uno against Jokowi and lost again. After Prabowo reconciled with Jokowi in July 2019, Gerindra joined the government coalition and he was later appointed the Minister of Defense. In 2024, Prabowo ran with Gibran Rakabuming Raka and won the presidential election in the first round.

== History ==
After coming last in Golkar's presidential convention on 21 April 2004, Prabowo served as a member of Golkar's Advisory Board until his resignation on 12 July 2008. Gerindra was formed on 6 February 2008 at the suggestion of Prabowo's younger brother, Hashim Djojohadikusumo, who helped pay for party's prime-time TV advertising campaign. Prabowo was appointed chairman of the party's Founding Board.

Gerindra's provincial level election teams were formed in February 2009. The party then claimed a membership of approximately 15 million, with its support base coming from across Java, Sumatra, Kalimantan and Sulawesi.

The party won 4.5% of the vote in the 2009 legislative election, and was awarded 26 seats in the People's Representative Council.

The Reform Star Party (PBR) was merged into Gerindra in February 2011.

In the national legislative election on 9 April 2014, the party's vote share jumped to 11.8%, making it the third-most popular party in Indonesia. Gerindra almost trebled the number of seats it won from 26 seats in 2009 to 73 seats in 2014.

Following the death of Gerindra chairman Suhardi on 28 August 2014, Prabowo was appointed general chairman on 20 September 2014.

== Political identities ==
=== Ideology ===
The 2008 Political Parties Act states that political parties are allowed to include specific characteristics that reflect their political aspirations, as long as they do not contradict Pancasila and the 1945 Constitution. As per Articles 5 and 7 of its constitution and bylaws (AD/ART), Gerindra is founded on Pancasila and the 1945 Constitution, while its identity is rooted in nationalism, populism, religion, and social justice. In February 2019, the party's central board member Andre Rosiade described Gerindra as a "nationalist-religious" party. Outsider views on the party's political orientation vary. Academics and domestic observers classified Gerindra as a nationalist party, while their international counterparts described it as a secular party with hard nationalist stance, ultranationalist, or "militant nationalist" party. Tom Power disagrees with labeling Gerindra as a secular party and categorizes it as a "inclusivist-nationalist" party, due to its perceived willingness to compromise on Islamic political agendas. Its political leaning has been described as right-wing to far-right or right-wing populist.

=== Political positions ===
In its political manifesto, Gerindra has taken positions on several issues. On politics, Gerindra seeks to overhaul Indonesia's political system, rejecting liberal democracy as counterproductive. It advocates a culturally aligned democracy, emphasizing robust national leadership based on Pancasila and the constitution. In the economic field, Gerindra advocates economic populism, criticizing Indonesia's liberal economy. It seeks increased state involvement, rejects rising foreign debt, opposes the privatization of state-owned enterprises (BUMN), calls for the reevaluation of laws favoring foreign entities (such as the Oil and Gas Law and the Investment Law), and favors reintroducing the New Order era Broad Outlines of State Policy (GBHN). Gerindra generally rejects economic liberalisation and supports protectionist to even state capitalist measures, while supporting some deregulation to support entrepreneurship, particularly for small and medium enterprises. Gerindra follows a populist and nationalist economic platform, targeting the lower middle class such as farmers and fishers, though its supporters in the 2014 general election were disproportionately urban dwellers.

The Gerindra parliamentary group in the DPR have expressed their opinions on a few issues:

Year	Bills	Votes	Party stances/Other views
2019	Revision of Law on the Corruption Eradication Commission; RUU KPK	Agree with reservations	Gerindra initially opposed the direct appointment of the KPK Supervisory Board members by the president, but later endorsed it after losing the vote during the bill's ratification.
2022	Sexual Violence Crime Act; RUU TPKS	Agree with reservations	Gerindra proposed removing the word "violence" from the bill's title to emphasize prevention over punishment.
2022	Law on State Capital; RUU IKN		
2022	Revision of the Indonesian Criminal Code; RUU KUHP		Gerindra backs the clause against kumpul kebo (cohabitation), considering it against religious beliefs and public norms in Indonesia. They see it as a threat to marital values and a cause of social issues, advocating for stricter penalties from 6 months to 1 year in prison.
2023	Omnibus Law on Job Creation; RUU Cipta Kerja		
2024	Special Region of Jakarta Act; RUU DKJ		Gerindra supports the clause proposing that Jakarta's governor and deputy governor be appointed by the president after consulting the Badan Musyawarah Suku Betawi 1982 (Betawi Tribe Deliberation Body), viewing it as public participation in lawmaking. Gerindra eventually endorsed the bill.

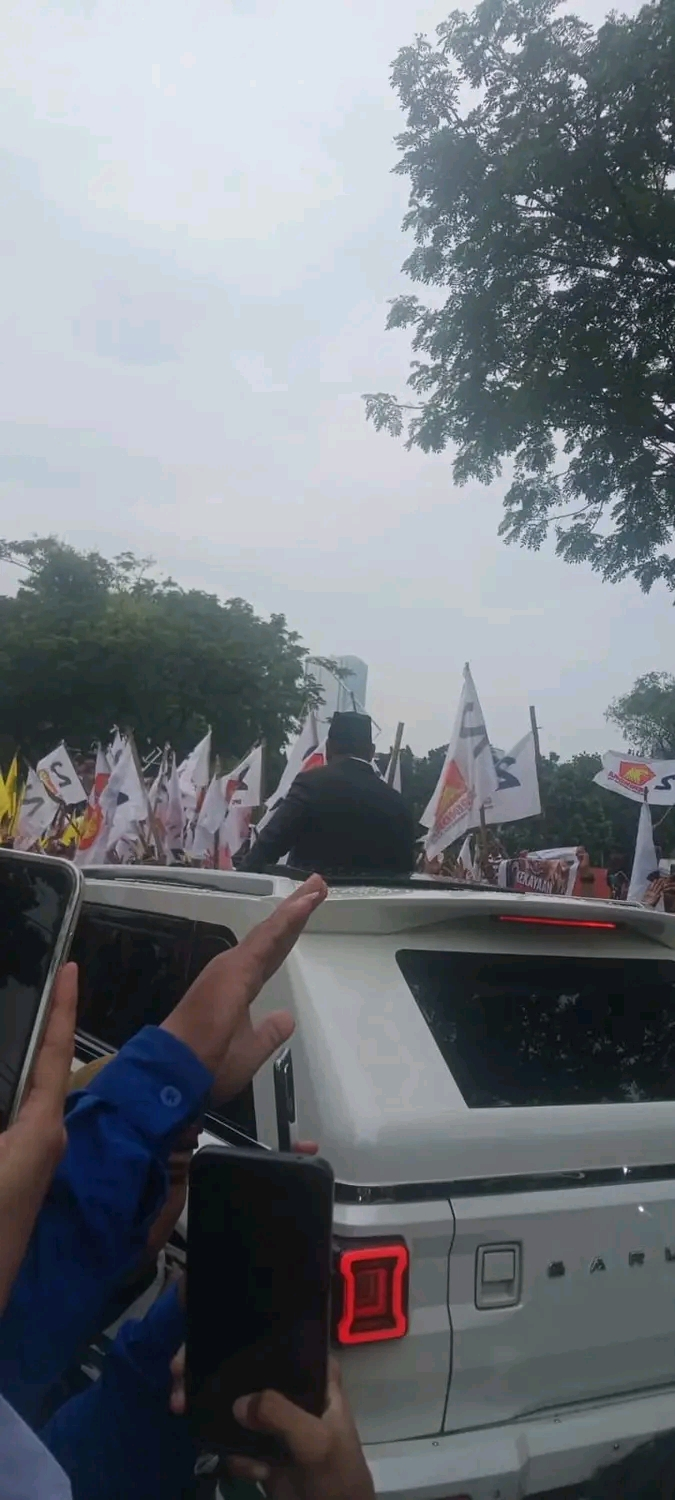
A crowd of Gerindra Party supporters met with Prabowo Subianto

== Leadership structure ==
The following leadership structure of the party are as follows (2020–2025)

Leader of the Advisory Council: General (Hon.) H. Prabowo Subianto Djojohadikusumo

Deputy Leader of the Advisory Council

- Hashim Djojohadikusumo
- Ahmad Muzani
- Sufmi Dasco Ahmad
- Fadli Zon
- Thomas Aquinas Djiwandono
- Angky Retno Yudianto
- Dedi Mulyadi
- Mochamad Iriawan
- Titiek Soeharto

Secretary of the Advisory Council: Sugiono

Vice Secretary of the Advisory Council: Prasetyo Hadi

General Chairman: General (Hon.) H. Prabowo Subianto Djojohadikusumo

Vice Chairman

- Deputy General Chairperson for Organization, Cadre Generation, Membership and Election Victory: Sufmi Dasco Ahmad
- Deputy General Chair for Foreign Affairs: Fadli Zon
- Deputy General Chair for Ideology, Politics, Government, Party Discipline and Strategic Information: Sugiono
- Deputy General Chairperson for Economic and Environmental Affairs: Budi Djiwandono
- Deputy Chairman of the General Chair for Defense and Security: Major General TNI (Ret.) Musa Bangun
- Deputy Chairperson General Chairperson for Network Potential Empowerment, Cooperatives and MSMEs: Ferry Joko Yuliantono
- Deputy Chairperson for Health and Employment Affairs: Drg. Putih Sari
- Deputy Chairperson of the General Chair for Youth, Women and Children: Rahayu Saraswati Djojohadikusumo
- Deputy Chairperson for Legal and Advocacy: Habiburokhman
- Deputy Chairperson for Community Service and People's Welfare: Sumaryati Amin Aryoso
- Deputy Chairperson for Education and Infrastructure: Susi Marleny Bachsin
- Deputy Chairman of the General Chair for Religious Affairs: Mochamad Irfan Yusuf

Secretary General: Ahmad Muzani

Treasurer: Thomas Aquinas Djiwandono

== Leaders ==
No.	Name	Portrait	Constituency / title	Term of office		Election results
No.	Name	Portrait	Constituency / title	Took office	Left office	Election results
Split from: Golkar Party (Subianto's faction)
General Chairpersons of the Gerindra Party (2008–present)
1	Suhardi (1952-2014)		–	6 February 2008	28 August 2014 (Note: Died in office.)	2008 Appointed
–	Vacant			28 August 2014	20 September 2014	
–	Prabowo Subianto (born 1951); Acting		–	20 September 2014	8 April 2015	2014 Unopposed
2	Prabowo Subianto (born 1951)		President of Indonesia (Note: since 20 October 2024)	8 April 2015	Incumbent	2015 Unopposed 2020 Unopposed 2025 Unopposed

== Wing organizations ==
Gerindra's wing organizations include:

- TIDAR (Tunas Indonesia Raya, Great Indonesia Bud)
- PIRA (Perempuan Indonesia Raya, Great Indonesia Woman)
- GEMIRA (Gerakan Muslim Indonesia Raya, Great Indonesia Muslim Movement)
- GEKIRA (Gerakan Kristiani Indonesia Raya, Great Indonesia Christian Movement); formerly named KIRA (Kristen Indonesia Raya, Great Indonesia Christians).
- GEMA SADHANA (Gerakan Masyarakat Sanathana Dharma Nusantara, Sanathana Dharma Nusantara Society Movement); for Hindus and Buddhists.
- PETIR (Persatuan Tionghoa Indonesia Raya, Great Indonesia Chinese Association)
- SATRIA (Satuan Relawan Indonesia Raya, Great Indonesia Volunteer Unit)
- SEGARA (Sentral Gerakan Buruh Indonesia Raya, Great Indonesia Labor Movement Center; for labour movements)
- KESIRA (Kesehatan Indonesia Raya, Great Indonesia Health; for health workers)
- BGM (Barisan Garuda Muda, Young Garuda Front)
- GMI (Garuda Muda Indonesia, Indonesia Young Garudas)
- Jari Raya (Jaringan Rakyat Indonesia Raya, Great Indonesia People's Network)

== Election results ==
=== Legislative election results ===
Election	Ballot number	Total seats won	Total votes	Share of votes	Seat change	Outcome of election	Party leader
2009	5	26 / 560	4,642,795	4.46%	▲26 seats	**Opposition**	Prabowo Subianto (Founding board chair); Suhardi (General chair)
2014	6	73 / 560	14,760,371	11.81%	▲47 seats	**Opposition**	Prabowo Subianto (Founding board chair); Suhardi (General chair)
2019	2	78 / 575	17,594,839	12.57%	▲5 seats	**Opposition** (2019)	Prabowo Subianto
2019	2	78 / 575	17,594,839	12.57%	▲5 seats	**Governing coalition** (2019–2024)	Prabowo Subianto
2024	2	86 / 580	20,071,345	13.22%	▲8 seats	**Governing coalition**	Prabowo Subianto

=== Presidential election results ===
Election	Ballot number	Pres. candidate	Running mate	1st round (Total votes)	Share of votes	Outcome	2nd round (Total votes)	Share of votes	Outcome
2009	1	Megawati Sukarnoputri	**Prabowo Subianto**	32,548,105	26.79%	Lost			
2014	1	**Prabowo Subianto**	Hatta Rajasa	62,576,444	46.85%	Lost			
2019	2	**Prabowo Subianto**	Sandiaga Uno	68,650,239	44.50%	Lost			
2024	2	**Prabowo Subianto**	Gibran Rakabuming Raka	96,214,691	58.59%	Elected			

Note: Bold text indicates the party member
