= Bank Negara Indonesia =

Indonesian state-owned banking company

PT Bank Negara Indonesia (Persero) Tbk
- Logo used since 21 July 2004

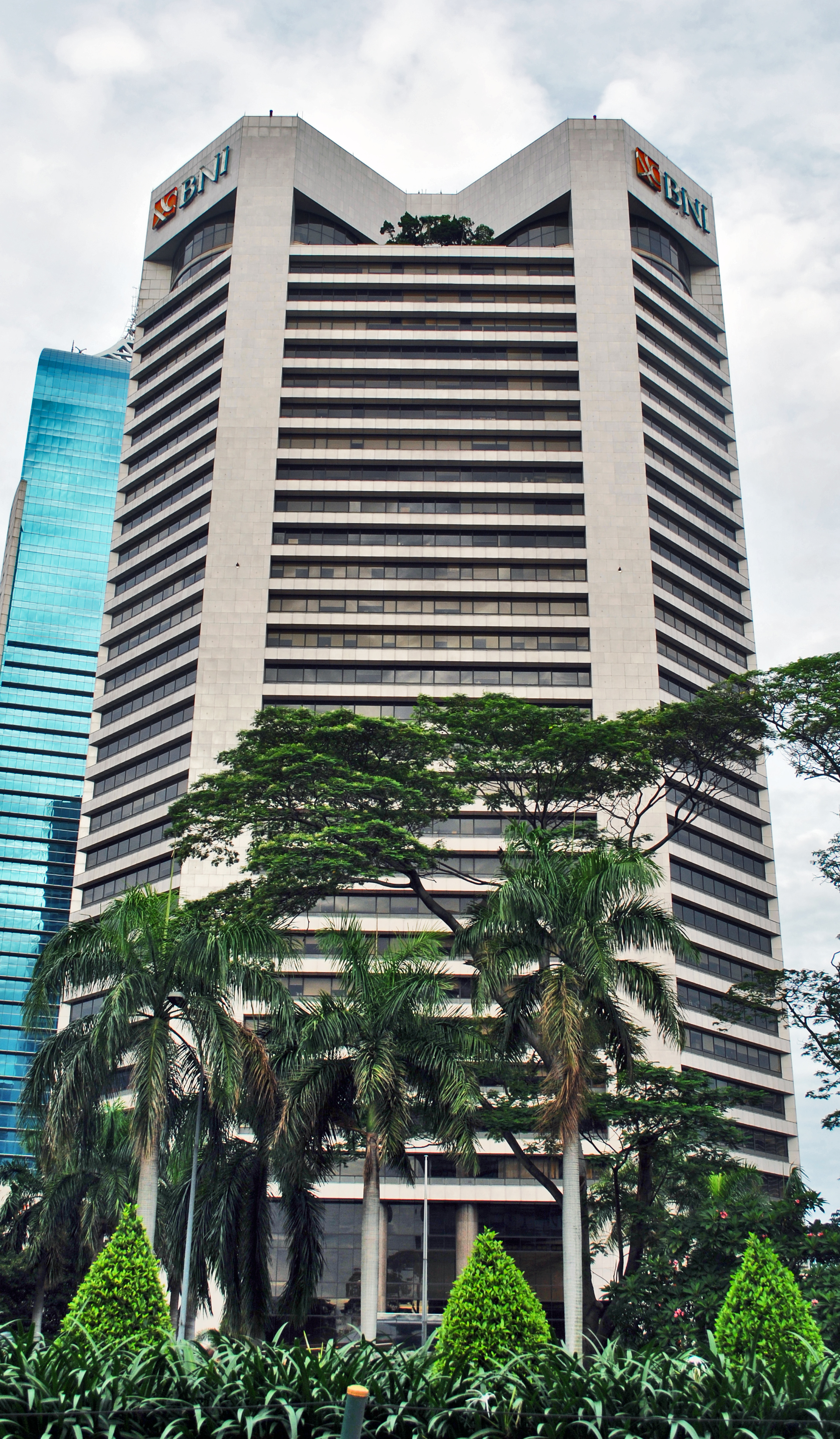
- BNI headquarters
- Formerly: Bank Negara Indonesia 1946 (1946–1992)
- Type: Public
- Traded as: IDX: BBNI
- Industry: Banking; Financial services
- Founded: 5 July 1946; 80 years ago in Yogyakarta
- Founder: Government of Indonesia (Note: Established by the government as a central bank, Margono Djojohadikusumo, often referred to as the founder, was appointed as the first director.)
- Headquarters: Grha BNI, Jakarta, Indonesia (registered office); Menara BNI Pejompongan, Jakarta, Indonesia (operational headquarters)
- Number of locations: 1,834 domestic offices and 10 overseas offices
- Area served: Australia; Hong Kong; Indonesia; Tokyo, Japan; Osaka, Japan; Seoul, South Korea; Singapore; Amsterdam, Netherlands; London, United Kingdom; New York, United States
- Key people: Putrama Wahju Setyawan (President Director/CEO); Omar Sjawaldy Anwar (President Commissioner)
- Products: Consumer Banking; Corporate Banking; Credit cards Investment banking Mortgage loans Private banking
- Revenue: ▲IDR 69.394 trillion (2025)
- Operating income: ▼IDR 24.395 trillion (2025)
- Net income: ▼IDR 20.04 trillion (2025)
- Total assets: ▲IDR 1,362 trillion (2025)
- Total equity: ▲IDR 176.339 trillion (2025)
- Owner: Danantara Asset Management (59.4%); State-Owned Enterprises Regulatory Agency (0.6%)
- Number of employees: 27,201 (2025)
- Subsidiaries: BNI Sekuritas; BNI Multifinance; BNI Life; BNI Remittance; Dana Pensiun Lembaga Keuangan BNI; PT Graha Sahari Surya Jaya; PT Swadharma Duta Data; Sanwa Bank London Branch; Bank Syariah Indonesia (25%)
- Website: www.bni.co.id/en-us
- Footnotes; Financials as of fiscal year ended 31 December 2025.

PT Bank Negara Indonesia (Persero) Tbk (lit. 'State Bank of Indonesia', formerly Bank Negara Indonesia 1946, lit. 'State Bank of Indonesia 1946') is an Indonesian state-owned bank. It has branches primarily in Indonesia, but it can also be found in Seoul, Singapore, Hong Kong, Tokyo, Amsterdam, London and New York. It had 1,834 domestic branches, six overseas branches, two representative offices, one overseas sub-branch, and one remittance branch (as of 2025) and more than 63 million customers in 2021. It is listed on the Indonesia Stock Exchange as "BBNI".

Its market capitalization as of 2025 was 170.959 trillion rupiah (approximately US$10 billion). It is the fourth-largest bank of Indonesia in terms of assets.

== History ==
=== Early years ===
Bank Negara Indonesia was established on 5 July 1946 both as a central bank and a commercial bank with Margono Djojohadikusumo appointed as the director and Abdul Karim as secretary. It was prepared to be the Central Bank of Indonesia with the task of issuing and handling Indonesian currency. A few months after its establishment, Bank Negara Indonesia officially distributed the first official currency of Indonesia – ORI or Oeang Republik Indonesia.

Following the appointment of the Bank of Java as the Central Bank of Indonesia, Bank Negara Indonesia had its role shifted to that of a development bank, and was later given the right to serve as a foreign exchange bank. Following increased capitalization in 1955, the legal status of Bank Negara Indonesia was changed into that of a commercial bank through a judicial assignment under Emergency Law number 2 of the year 1955. Also in 1955, Bank Negara Indonesia officially opened its first foreign branch in Singapore.

In 1965, it became a single-tier bank (even Bank Indonesia was absorbed); BNI was the bank that granted the first foreign bank licenses during the transition to the New Order, shortly before the reestablishment of Bank Indonesia that same year.

=== Bank Negara Indonesia 1946 ===
Former Bank Negara Indonesia 1946 logo used from 1946 to 1988.

After a merger period with several other commercial banks, the function and individuality of the Bank were restored in 1968. The status was resumed to that of a state-run commercial bank. The official name was changed to 'Bank Negara Indonesia 1946'.

Bank Negara Indonesia 1946 conducted an operational restructuring program, by formulating the 'Performance Improvement Program' to facilitate a more dynamic role in facing the continuously changing environment. The program covered various aspects, including the improvement of the Corporate Vision and Mission, the refinement of strategic plans, as well as the development of technology and human resources.

=== Bank Negara Indonesia ===
Former Bank Negara Indonesia logo from 1988 to 2004

Signifying the determination of Bank Negara Indonesia 1946 to create a new image and attitudes in line with its aspiration to play a more international role and to respond to the challenges of globalization, the Bank changed its corporate logo into a 'Sailing Boat' and introduced the nickname of 'Bank BNI'.

The law number 7 of the year 1992 opened-up opportunities for state-run banks to change their legal status into Limited State-Owned Corporations (or Persero). With this change in legal status, the Bank's name was officially replaced with 'PT. Bank Negara Indonesia (Persero)'.

In 1996, Bank Negara Indonesia's decision to become a public company was manifested through an initial public offering (IPO) of its shares through the stock exchange. Bank Negara Indonesia was the first government bank in Indonesia which listed its shares on both the Jakarta Stock Exchange (now Indonesia Stock Exchange) and the Surabaya Stock Exchange. The corporate name was amended to 'PT. Bank Negara Indonesia (Persero) Tbk', to show its status as a public company.

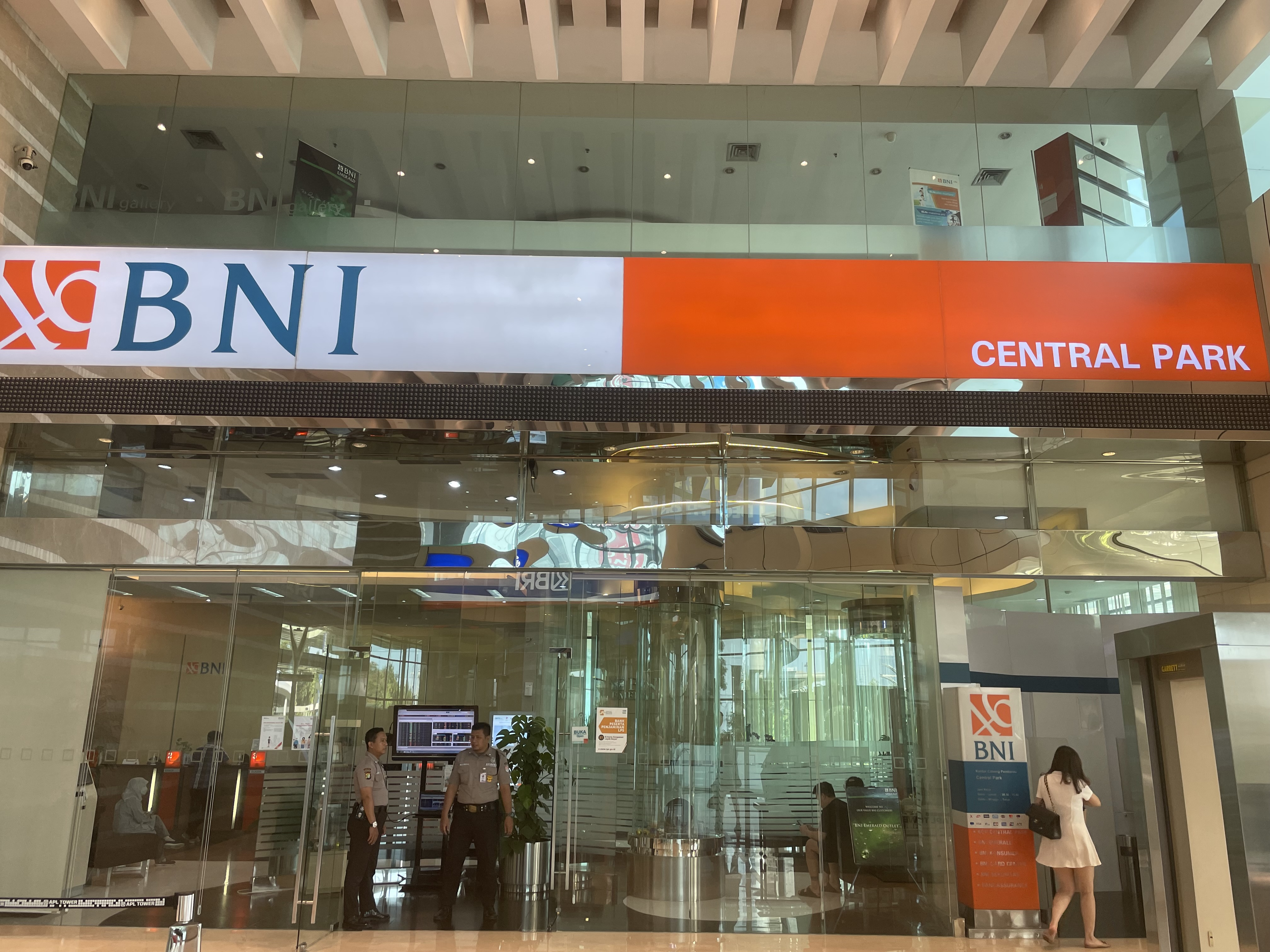
Bank Negara Indonesia branch at Central Park Jakarta

The government's banking recapitalization program, launched after the 1997 Asian financial crisis, provided BNI with additional capital of IDR 61.2 trillion.

=== Recent development (BNI '46) ===
The bank introduced the latest logo in 2004. The nickname 'Bank BNI' was changed to 'BNI'.

In 2022, Bank Negara Indonesia officially acquired Bank Mayora and planned to transform the bank into a digital bank that focuses on the MSME segment. Bank Negara Indonesia also established BNI Ventures to do business in the venture capital sector. In 2023, the bank changed the name of Bank Mayora to Hibank.

In 2025, Bank Negara Indonesia received recognition as one of Indonesia's most trustworthy banks, with PT Bank Central Asia Tbk (BCA) ranked first among Indonesian banks in the Newsweek World's Most Trustworthy Companies 2025 survey.

== Offices worldwide ==
Logo of BNI's 80th anniversary

- Bank Negara Indonesia Singapore, operated under a full bank license granted by the Monetary Authority of Singapore
- Bank Negara Indonesia Hong Kong
- Bank Negara Indonesia Tokyo
- Bank Negara Indonesia Osaka
- Bank Negara Indonesia Seoul
- Bank Negara Indonesia Amsterdam
- Bank Negara Indonesia London
- Bank Negara Indonesia New York
- Bank Negara Indonesia Sydney

== Sports sponsorships ==
In football, from 2012 until 2014 Bank Negara Indonesia was the official regional partner of Premier League football club Chelsea Football Club in Indonesia.

In motorsports, since 2016 Bank Negara Indonesia currently is the official personal sponsor of Sean Gelael and official banking partner of Team Jagonya Ayam racing management.

== Slogans ==
- 1946–1992: Swadharma Bhakti Negara
- 1992–2004: Tepercaya, Kokoh, dan Bersahabat (Reliable, Solid, and Friendly)
- 2003–2004: Melayani Dengan Kebanggaan Sebagai Bank Anak Negeri (Serving with Pride as a Nation's Bank)
- 2004–Sekarang: Melayani Negeri, Kebanggaan Bangsa (Serving the Country, the Pride of the Nation)

== See also ==
- Wisma 46 – Skyscraper in Jakarta, Indonesia
- Bank Indonesia
- List of banks in Indonesia
