= Jakarta III (electoral district) =

Electoral district in Indonesia

Jakarta Special Capital Region III
- Daerah Khusus Ibukota Jakarta III
- Constituency for the House of Representatives
- Location of Central and South Jakarta (Numbered 1 and 3 on the map)
- Region: 2 cities and 1 regency in Jakarta; City: North Jakarta, West Jakarta; Regency: Thousand Islands

Current constituency
- Created: 2009; 17 years ago
- Seats: 8 (2009—present)
- Members: Darmadi Durianto (PDI-P); Charles Honoris (PDI-P); Erwin Aksa (Golkar); Ahmad Sahroni (NasDem); Adang Daradjatun (PKS); Sigit Purnomo Said (PAN); Rahayu Saraswati (Gerindra); Nurwayah (Demokrat)
- Created from: Jakarta I; Jakarta II

Jakarta Special Capital Region III (Indonesian: Daerah Khusus Ibukota Jakarta III), abbreviated as DKI Jakarta III, is an electoral district in Indonesia which encompasses of North, West Jakarta and Thousand Islands Regency in the Jakarta Special Capital Region. Since its inception in 2009, this district has been represented by eight members of People's Representative Council (DPR RI).

== Components ==
- 2009–present: North Jakarta, West Jakarta, and Thousand Island Regency

== List of members ==
The following list is in alphabetical order. Party with the largest number of members is placed on top of the list.

Election	Member	Party	Votes won
2009	Eddy Sadeli	Demokrat	42,509
2009	Marzuki Alie	Demokrat	77,614
2009	Vera Febyanthy	Demokrat	35,873
2009	Achmad Rilyadi (2009—13) (Note: Resigned.); Wirianingsih (2013–14)	PKS	22,094
2009	Adang Daradjatun	PKS	119,287
2009	Effendi Simbolon	PDI-P	59,718
2009	Harun Al Rasyid; Dahlia Bachtiar	Gerindra	19,326
2009	M. Ade Surapriatna	Golkar	20,378
2014	Charles Honoris	PDI-P	
2014	Darmadi Durianto	PDI-P	
2014	Effendi Simbolon	PDI-P	
2014	Achmad Dimyati Natakusumah (2014–17) (Note: Resigned from the party.); Abdul Aziz (2018–19) (Note: Interim replacement since 31 October 2018.)	PPP	
2014	Adang Daradjatun	PKS	
2014	Ahmad Sahroni	NasDem	
2014	Aryo Djojohadikusumo	Gerindra	
2014	Tantowi Yahya (2014—17) (Note: Appointed as Ambassador of Indonesia to New Zealand.); Ivan Doly Gultom (2017—19) (Note: Interim replacement since 30 May 2017.)	Golkar	
2019	Charles Honoris	PDI-P	102,408
2019	Darmadi Durianto	PDI-P	105,243
2019	Effendi Simbolon	PDI-P	61,595
2019	Abraham Lunggana (2019–21); Dian Istiqomah (2022–)	PAN	69.782
2019	Adang Daradjatun	PKS	115,649
2019	Ahmad Sahroni	NasDem	69,196
2019	Kamrussamad	Gerindra	83,562
2019	Santoso	Demokrat	34,449
2024	Charles Honoris	PDI-P	
2024	Darmadi Durianto	PDI-P	
2024	Erwin Aksa Mahmud	Golkar	
2024	Ahmad Sahroni	NasDem	
2024	Adang Daradjatun	PKS	
2024	Sigit Purnomo Said	PAN	
2024	Rahayu Saraswati	Gerindra	
2024	Nurwayah	Demokrat	

== See also ==
- List of Indonesian national electoral districts
