= Ade Surapriatna =

Indonesian politician (born 1951)

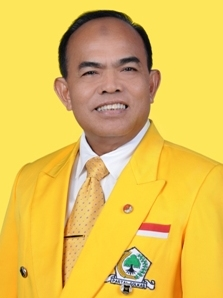

Member of the House of Representatives
- In office 1 October 2009 – 1 October 2014
- Constituency: Jakarta III

14th Speaker of the Jakarta Regional House of Representatives
- In office 4 October 2004 – 25 August 2009
- Preceded by: Agung Imam Sumanto
- Succeeded by: Ferrial Sofyan

Deputy Speaker of the Jakarta Regional House of Representatives
- In office 1997–2004

Member of the Jakarta Regional House of Representatives
- In office 1992 – 25 August 2009

Personal details
- Born: 7 November 1951 (age 73); Jakarta, Indonesia
- Political party: Golkar

Muhammad Ade Surapriatna (born 7 November 1951) is an Indonesian politician who was a member of the House of Representatives (DPR) from 2009 to 2014. He was also a member of the Jakarta Regional House of Representatives (DPRD) between from 1992 go 2009, serving as the DPRD speaker between from 2004 to 2009 and its deputy speaker between 1997 and 2004.

== Early life and career ==
Muhammad Ade Surapriatna was born on 7 November 1951 in Jakarta from Abdul Kirom Imam and Siti Salha. He was the third of eleven children. He studied in Jakarta, and graduated from the National Maritime Academy in 1969. He then worked at several companies. During his studies, he had joined the students' regiment in 1971, becoming involved in the newly formed Golkar.

== Political career ==
He was first elected into Jakarta's legislature in 1992, and he would be reelected in 1997, 1999, and 2004. He was deputy speaker of the legislature between 1997 and 2004. He was also deputy chairman of Golkar's Jakarta branch between 1992 and 2001, and was elected chairman in 2001. For his 2004–2009 tenure, Ade was elected as speaker of the legislature, being sworn in on 4 October 2004. Also in 2004, Ade was reelected as chairman of Golkar's Jakarta branch until 2009.

In the leadup to the 2007 Jakarta gubernatorial election, Ade was considered as one of the two leading candidates for Golkar's ticket, competing with Fauzi Bowo. However, Ade abruptly resigned his candidacy in a February 2007 Golkar meeting, paving Fauzi Bowo's candidacy. In late 2008/early 2009, several factions in the legislature launched a motion of no confidence against Ade, citing the 2009 provincial budget which according to the factions contained excess spending. Ade refused to resign in response.

Ade ran as a candidate for the national legislature in the 2009 Indonesian legislative election to represent Jakarta's 3rd electoral district, and was elected with 20,378 votes. He ran for reelection in the 2014 legislative election, but did not win a seat. On one occasion during campaigning for the 2014 election, a number of Golkar supporters on a rally were ticketed for violating traffic laws. Ade confronted the police officer at the location, defending the campaigners and calling for special dispensation.
