= Sahroni =

Sahroni is a given name and a surname. Notable people with the name include:

- Sahroni (footballer), Indonesian footballer
- Ahmad Sahroni (born 1977), Indonesian politician
