= Santoso =

Santoso is an Indonesian surname. Notable people with this surname include:

- Ade Yusuf Santoso (born 1993), Indonesian badminton player
- Aji Santoso (born 1970), an Indonesian former footballer and currently a coach
- Asep Budi Santoso (born 1990), Indonesian football defender
- Djoko Santoso (born 1952), retired Indonesian general
- Iman Budhi Santoso (born 1948), Indonesian author of poetry collections, novels, and short stories
- Santoso, alias Abu Wardah (1976–2016), Islamic leader of East Indonesia Mujahideen
- Maria Ulfah Santoso (1911–1988), Indonesian women's rights activist and politician
- Budi Santoso (born 1975), Indonesian retired badminton player
- Dendi Santoso (born 1990), Indonesian football winger
- Hoegeng Iman Santoso (1921–2004), Chief of the Indonesian National Police
- Mona Santoso (born 1982), former Indonesian badminton player
- Ryan Santoso (born 1995), American football placekicker and punter
- Santoso (Indonesian politician) (born 1969)
- Simon Santoso (born 1985), Indonesian male badminton player
- Surya Santoso, American electrical engineer, academic, senior member of the IEEE

== See also ==
- Santos (disambiguation)
