= Simbolon =

Simbolon is one of Toba Batak clans originating from Samosir, North Sumatra, Indonesia. People of this clan bear the clan's name as their surname. Notable people of this clan include:

- Effendi Simbolon (born 1964), Indonesian politician
- Maludin Simbolon (1916–2000), Indonesian military officer
