= Kamrussamad =

Indonesian politician (born 1974)

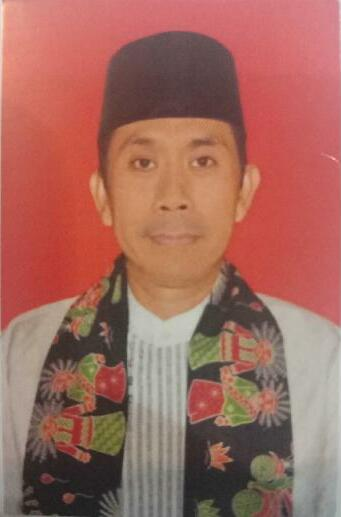

Member of the People's Representative Council
- Incumbent
- Assumed office 1 October 2019
- Constituency: Jakarta III

Personal details
- Born: 20 July 1974 (age 51); Ma'rang, South Sulawesi, Indonesia
- Political party: Gerindra

Kamrussamad (born 20 July 1974) is an Indonesian politician who has served as a member of the People's Representative Council since 2019. He is part of the Gerindra Party.

== Early life ==
Kamrussamad was born in Ma'rang, a district located in South Sulawesi north of the provincial capital of Makassar, on 20 July 1974. He was the fifth of seven children. He moved to Makassar for middle school, and studied industrial engineering at the Indonesian Muslim University in Makassar. He moved to Jakarta in 1999. He later obtained a master's degree in international business from the University of Indonesia.

== Career ==
In 2017, he was elected as the Coordinating President for the Alumni Corps of the Muslim Students' Association. In 2022, he was elected as president of the Alumni Corps' entrepreneurs' association.

=== Politics ===
In the 2004 Indonesian legislative election, he unsuccessfully ran for a seat in the People's Representative Council (DPR) as a Golkar candidate. In the 2009 election, he ran for a seat at the Regional Representative Council and again did not win a seat. His third failed attempt was in the 2014 election, when he ran for a DPR seat under Gerindra in South Sulawesi's 2nd electoral district. Additionally, he also ran in the 2010 and 2015 regency elections for Pangkajene and Islands Regency, as a regent candidate in 2010 and as a vice-regent candidate in 2015. He received 6.49% of votes in 2010 and 41.78% in 2015, losing in both elections. During the 2014 election, Kamrussamad had become chairman of Gerindra's branch in Pangkejene and Islands. He still holds the chairmanship as of 2023.

Kamrussamad ran again as a DPR member in the 2019 election, this time from Jakarta's 3rd electoral district. He won 83,562 votes, the fourth highest in the district and the highest of Gerindra candidates, winning a seat in the legislature. He was sworn in as a legislator on 1 October 2019. Within the council, Kamrussamad is a member of its eleventh commission on finance and banking. He was reelected for a second term in the 2024 election with 70,309 votes.

He has promoted carbon emission trading in Indonesia, citing potential revenues from Indonesian rainforests. He has also supported a ban by the Indonesian Trade Ministry on the import of secondhand clothes.
