= Darmadi Durianto =

Indonesian politician (born 1967)

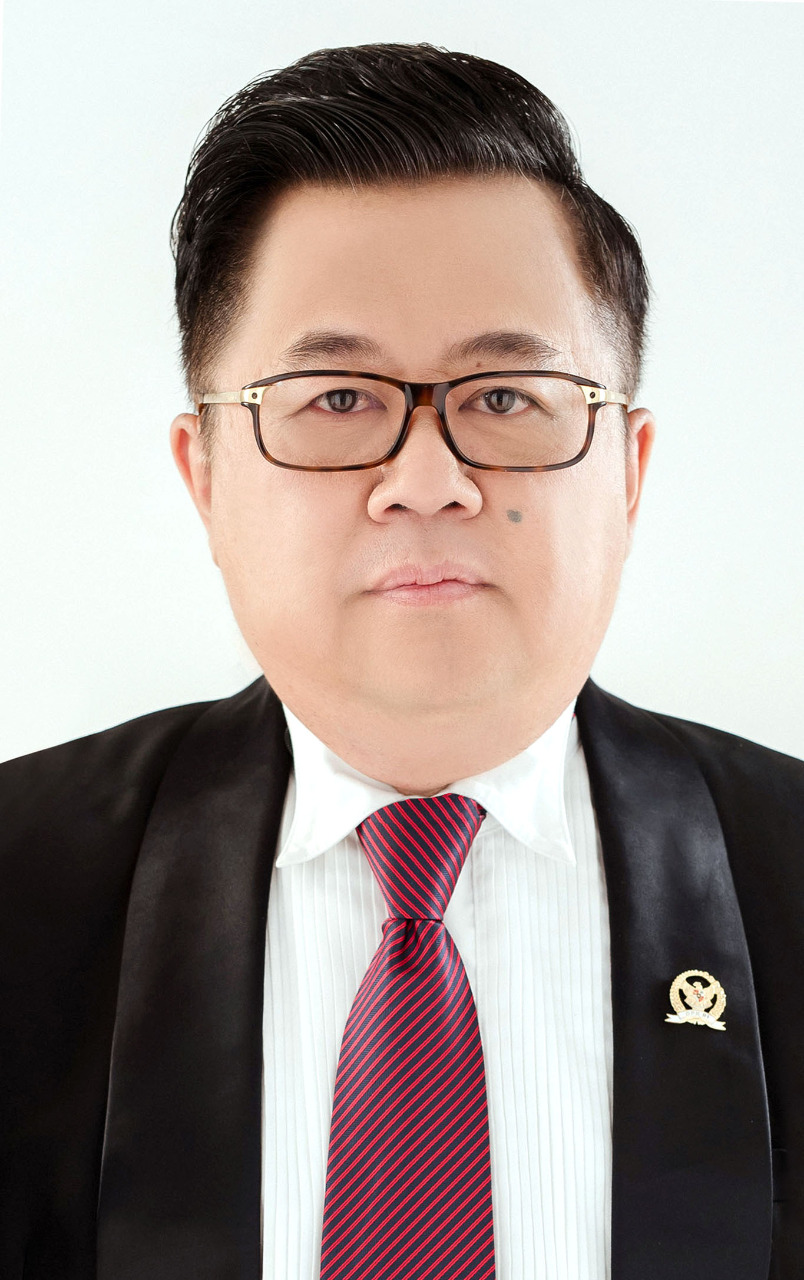

Member of People's Representative Council
- Incumbent
- Assumed office 1 October 2014
- Constituency: Jakarta III

Personal details
- Born: June 25, 1967 (age 58); Mempawah, West Kalimantan
- Political party: PDI-P

Darmadi Durianto (born 25 June 1967) is an Indonesian politician from PDI-P and academic who is a member of the People's Representative Council. A Chinese Indonesian, Durianto was first elected into the legislative body in 2014.

== Background ==
Damadi Durianto (Chinese: 林德纯; pinyin: Lín Déchún) was born in Mempawah Regency of West Kalimantan on 25 June 1967. He graduated with a degree in management from Atma Jaya Catholic University in 1990.

Durianto is of Chinese descent, and he is the advisory board head of West Kalimantan Chinese Indonesian Association (Indonesian: Perhimpunan Tionghoa Kalbar Indonesia).

== Career ==
Durianto lectured at his alma mater Atma Jaya and the Kwik Kian Gie School of Business in Jakarta, teaching graduate courses. He first joined PDI-P around 2003–2004, as part of a think tank within the party. He ran for a seat in the People's Representative Council in 2009 from the Central Sulawesi constituency, but did not secure a seat.

In the 2014 legislative election, Durianto ran as a candidate from PDI-P and won 52,861 votes, securing a seat in the People's Representative Council from Jakarta's 3rd electoral district. He became a member of the body's sixth commission which handles investments and industry.

In 2018, Durianto expressed his concern over the presence of low-quality imported Chinese steel in the Indonesian market. Durianto also opposed a decision by the central government in 2018 to allow rice imports, and requested a coordinated explanation from the ministries involved in the decision making. He defended Widodo's government from accusations of overborrowing, and called the attacks a "structured, systematic issue made up by certain parties".

He attacked incumbent vice president Jusuf Kalla in 2018, criticising Kalla's political maneuvering and requested parties in Widodo's coalition to exercise caution. Durianto also called PKB politician Muhaimin Iskandar's efforts to become Widodo's running mate in the 2019 presidential election simply an effort to boost the party's electability. Durianto was reelected from the same district in the 2019 legislative election after winning 105,243 votes, and was reelected for a third term in the 2024 election with 95,553 votes.
