= Sofyan =

Sofyan is a surname and a given name. Notable people with the name include:

Given name:

- Sofyan Amrabat (born 1996), Dutch footballer
- Sofyan Chader (born 2000), French footballer
- Sofyan Djalil (born 1953), Indonesian academic and politician
- Sofyan El Gadi (born 1992), Libyan swimmer
- Sofyan Franyata Hariyanto (born 1965), Indonesian bureaucrat
- Sofyan Tan, (born 1959), Indonesian doctor and politician
- Sofyan Taya (1971–2023), Palestinian scientist, president of the Islamic University of Gaza
- Sofyan Wanandi (born 1941), Indonesian businessman

Surname:

- Dustin Sofyan (born 1994), Indonesian racing driver
- Ferrial Sofyan (born 1949), Indonesian politician and former military officer
- Ismed Sofyan (born 1979), Indonesian footballer
- Selvyana Adrian-Sofyan (born 1951), Indonesian sport shooter
- Yandi Sofyan (born 1992), Indonesian footballer
