= Dian Istiqomah =

Indonesian politician (born 1978)

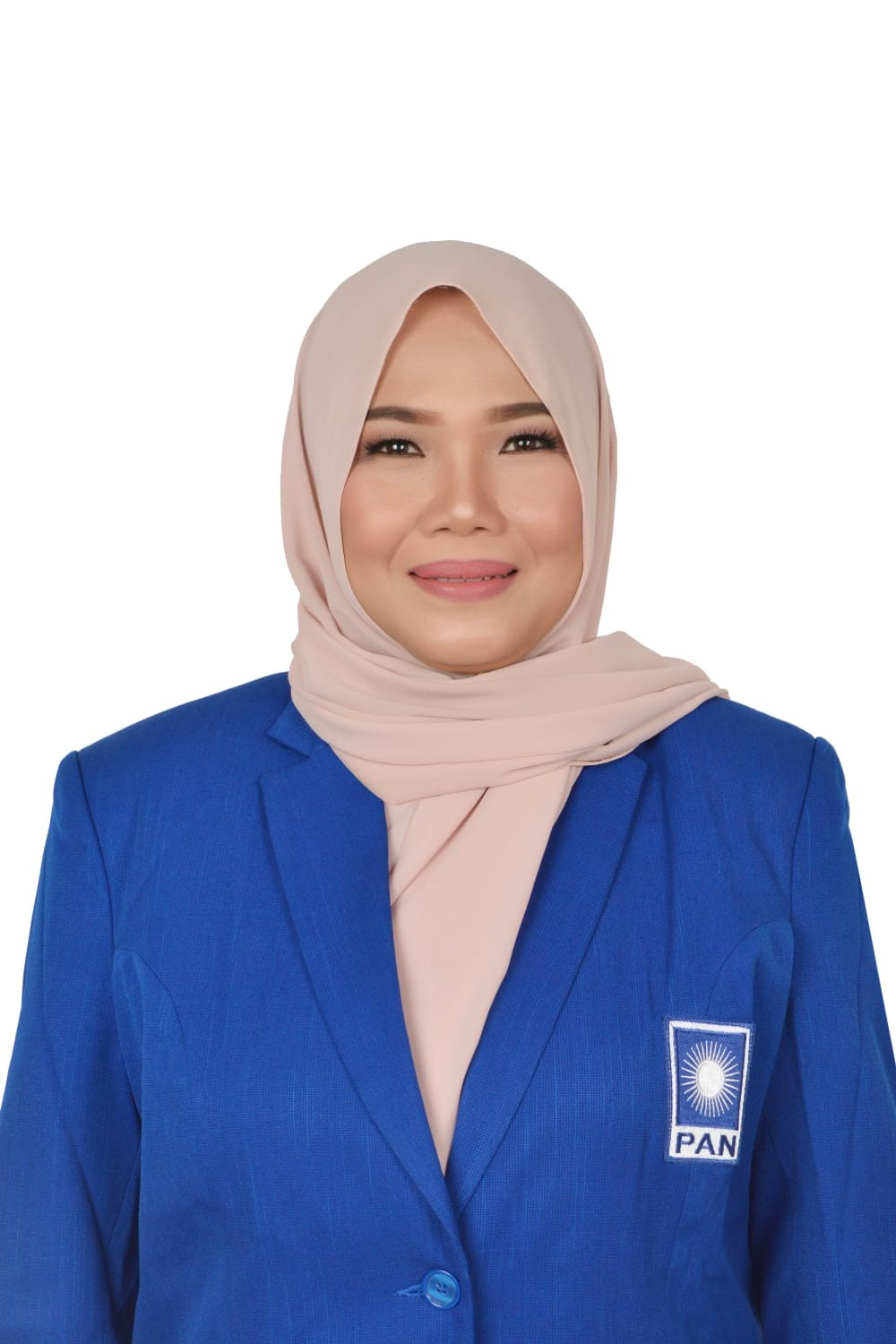

Member of House of Representatives
- In office 11 January 2022 – 1 October 2024
- Preceded by: Abraham Lunggana
- Constituency: Jakarta III

Personal details
- Born: 27 February 1978 (age 47); Banyumas, Central Java, Indonesia
- Political party: National Mandate Party

Dian Istiqomah (born 27 February 1978) is an Indonesian politician of the National Mandate Party. She served as a member of the House of Representatives between 2022 and 2024, as the replacement for Abraham Lunggana.

== Early life ==
Istiqomah was born in Banyumas Regency on 27 February 1978. She was educated in state-funded schools in Banyumas, graduating from high school in 1996. She then obtained a diploma in nursing in 1999. Later, she would study medical science at the Muhammadiyah University Purwokerto, graduating with a bachelors in 2014. She later also obtained a master's degree in hospital management.

== Career ==
She worked as a nurse and joined the National Mandate Party (PAN), running for a legislative seat from Jakarta's 3rd electoral district in the 2019 Indonesian legislative election. Istiqomah campaigned on improving the BPJS Kesehatan health insurance system. She won under 4,000 votes, and was not elected. She was appointed as a member of the People's Representative Council on 11 January 2022, to replace Abraham Lunggana who had resigned from PAN and also died the previous month. In October 2022, she filed a defamation lawsuit against a number of individuals who accused her of falsifying documents.

She ran for a full term in the 2024 election, but was not elected.
