= Adang Daradjatun =

Indonesian politician and former police general

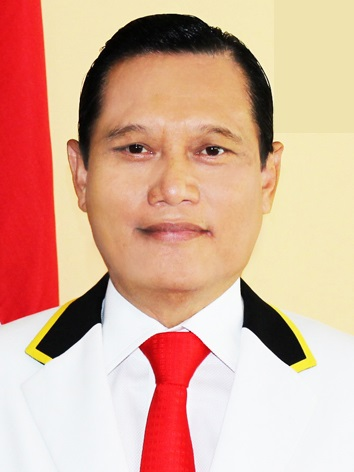
- Election image of Adang Daradjatun, from the 2007 Jakarta gubernatorial elections

Member of People's Representative Council
- Incumbent
- Assumed office 1 October 2009
- Constituency: Jakarta III

Deputy Chief of Polri
- In office 20 July 2004 – 21 December 2006
- Police chief: Da'i Bachtiar; Sutanto
- Preceded by: Kadaryanto
- Succeeded by: Makbul Padmanegara

Personal details
- Born: 13 May 1949 (age 77) Bogor, West Java, Indonesia
- Party: Prosperous Justice Party

Military service
- Allegiance: Indonesia
- Branch/service: Indonesian National Police
- Years of service: 1971–2006
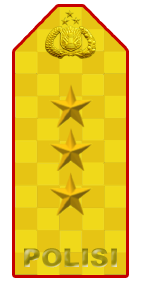
- Rank: Police Commissioner-General

Adang Daradjatun (born 13 May 1949) is an Indonesian politician and former police general who currently serves as a member of the House of Representatives, representing Jakarta's 3rd district since 2009.

Daradjatun originated from Bogor, and was educated in Jakarta and Bandung before he entered the police academy. Prior to his entrance to politics, Daradjatun served for 35 years in the Indonesian National Police, peaking as its deputy chief before he resigned in 2006 to run in Jakarta's gubernatorial election in 2007. After losing, Daradjatun was elected into the People's Representative Council in 2009 and was reelected in 2014, 2019 and 2024.

== Early life and family ==
Adang Daradjatun was born in Bogor on 13 May 1949. His father was a prosecutor, and he completed elementary and junior high school in Jakarta. He initially studied in Jakarta for his high school, but he moved to Bandung midway. After graduating from high school in 1968, he joined the Indonesian Police Academy (Akpol).

He is married to Nunun Nurbaeti, who in 2012 was convicted to 2.5 years in prison for bribery. The couple has four children.

== Career ==
=== Police ===
After graduating from the police academy in 1971, Daradjatun began to work as a police, initially starting as an inspector before eventually heading multiple local police departments. He was a police captain by 1978. Eventually, he was appointed as Chief of the West Java Police department in 2000, and later as the head of training and security. On 20 July 2004, he was made the deputy chief of police.

In December 2006, he resigned from his position to run as a candidate in the 2007 Jakarta gubernatorial election, with the rank of Police Commissioner-General (a three-star rank). He was replaced by the head of the Criminal Investigation Agency Makbul Padmanegara.

=== Politics ===
Daradjatun was supported solely by the Prosperous Justice Party for his gubernatorial bid, and faced Fauzi Bowo, which was backed by a large coalition of 19 parties. Daradjatun eventually lost, though he secured over 1.5 million (42.13 percent) votes.

Following his defeat, Daradjatun ran in the 2009 Indonesian legislative election and managed to secure a seat from Jakarta's 3rd electoral district. He was assigned to the body's third commission.

He was reelected for his second term after he won 27,164 votes in the 2014 Indonesian legislative election, a third term in the 2019 legislative election with 115,649 votes, and a fourth term in 2024 with 95,773 votes.
