= Ivan Doly Gultom =

Indonesian politician

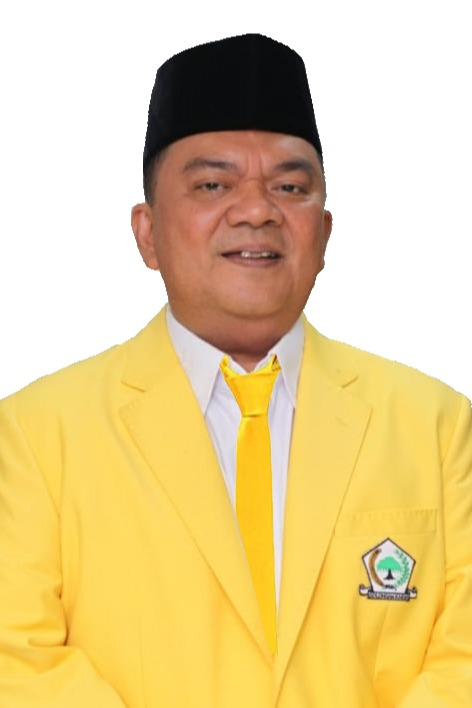

Member of People's Representative Council
- In office 30 May 2017 – 1 October 2019
- President: Joko Widodo
- Preceded by: Tantowi Yahya
- Constituency: Jakarta 3

Personal details
- Born: 4 March 1967 (age 58); Binjai, North Sumatra
- Political party: Golkar

Ivan Doly Gultom (born 4 March 1967) is an Indonesian politician of Golkar who served as a member of the People's Representative Council between 2017 and 2019. He was appointed to the body in 2017 to replace Tantowi Yahya.

== Biography ==
Ivan Doly Gultom was born in Binjai, North Sumatra on 4 March 1967. Between 1988 and 1991, he studied for a bachelor's degree at Pepperdine University. Before being elected into office, Gultom worked as CEO of several companies.

He ran in the 2009 Indonesian legislative election from Jakarta's 3rd electoral district - covering North Jakarta, West Jakarta, and Thousand Islands Regency, but failed to win a seat.

Gultom once more participated in the 2014 Indonesian legislative election and won 30,462 votes, but failed to secure a seat, with Tantowi Yahya being Golkar's sole representative from the Jakarta 3 district. Following his defeat, he remained active politically, endorsing the ultimately unsuccessful bid of Basuki Tjahaja Purnama and Djarot Saiful Hidayat in the 2017 Jakarta gubernatorial election.

In 2017, Yahya resigned from DPR as he was appointed Indonesia's ambassador to New Zealand. Gultom was appointed in his place and was sworn in on 30 May 2017. In the council, he is part of the seventh commission (on energy, research and technology, and the environment). In May 2018, he noted that Freeport-McMoRan's Grasberg mine was violating regulations by exporting ore despite not possessing an environmental impact analysis or a smelter permit. He added that the Ministry of Environment and Forestry should revoke the mine's permits.
