= Fientje Maritje Suebu =

Indonesian diplomat

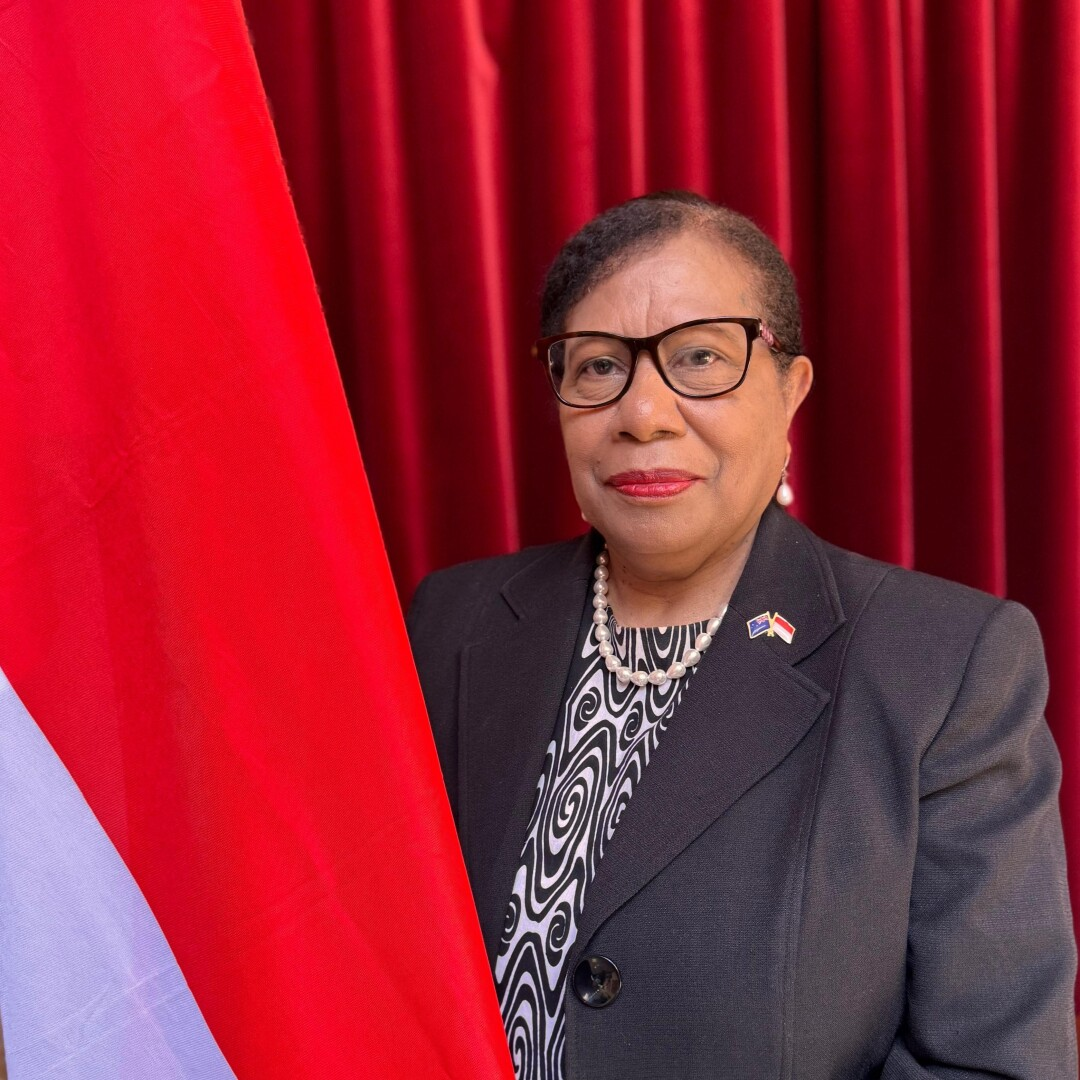

Ambassador of Indonesia to New Zealand, Samoa, Tonga, Niue, and the Cook Islands
- Incumbent
- Assumed office 12 January 2022
- President: Joko Widodo; Prabowo Subianto
- Preceded by: Tantowi Yahya

Personal details
- Born: Sentani, Jayapura, Indonesia
- Education: Cenderawasih University
- Nickname: Ice

Fientje Maritje Suebu is an Indonesian diplomat who is serving as the Indonesian ambassador to New Zealand, with concurrent accreditation to Samoa, the Kingdom of Tonga, the Cook Islands and Niue, since 12 January 2022. She is the first indigenous Papuan woman to be appointed as ambassador.

== Early life and education ==
Fientje Maritje Suebu was born in Sentani, Jayapura, as the only daughter among five sons of a tribal chief. Among her relatives, she is affectionately known as Ice. She completed her high school education in Papua New Guinea and began studying English literature at the Cenderawasih University in 1981. She graduated with a bachelor's degree in 1985.

== Career ==
Suebu joined the foreign department (now the foreign ministry) shortly after graduating from university. Her initial motivation for joining the department was simply to relocate to Jakarta and secure employment, with no prior understanding of a diplomatic career. Her stint began as a staff at the international directorate from July 1986 until June 1989.

Her first international posting was at the embassy in Harare, where she served as second secretary for socio-cultural affairs from June 1989 to November 1993. Upon her return to Jakarta, she was appointed as section chief in the directorate for Africa and the Middle East from November 1993 to July 1997. She then became first secretary for political affairs at the embassy in Brussels from June 1997 to July 2001, with accreditation on 9 August 1997.

After her service in Brussels, she became deputy director (chief of sub-directorate) for American and European cooperation in the ministry from July 2001 to June 2004. Her career then led her to New Delhi where she served as minister counsellor at the embassy there from June 2004 to July 2008. Following this, she was appointed as the chief of administration and documentation in the directorate general for Asia, Pacific and Africa from July 2008 to July 2012.

Suebu was assigned to the embassy in Ottawa as minister counsellor for information and socio-cultural affairs from July 2012 to January 2016. She returned to the foreign ministry with her assignment as a senior diplomat at the directorate for South and Central Asian affairs from February 2016 to February 2018. In February 2018, she was appointed as deputy ambassador to India.

=== Ambassador to New Zealand ===
In February 2021, Suebu was nominated by President Joko Widodo as ambassador to New Zealand, with concurrent accreditation to Samoa, the Kingdom of Tonga, the Cook Islands and Niue. Her nomination was approved by the House of Representatives first commission after passing an assessment in July that year. She was installed on 12 January 2022, becoming the first indigenous Papuan woman to be appointed as ambassador.

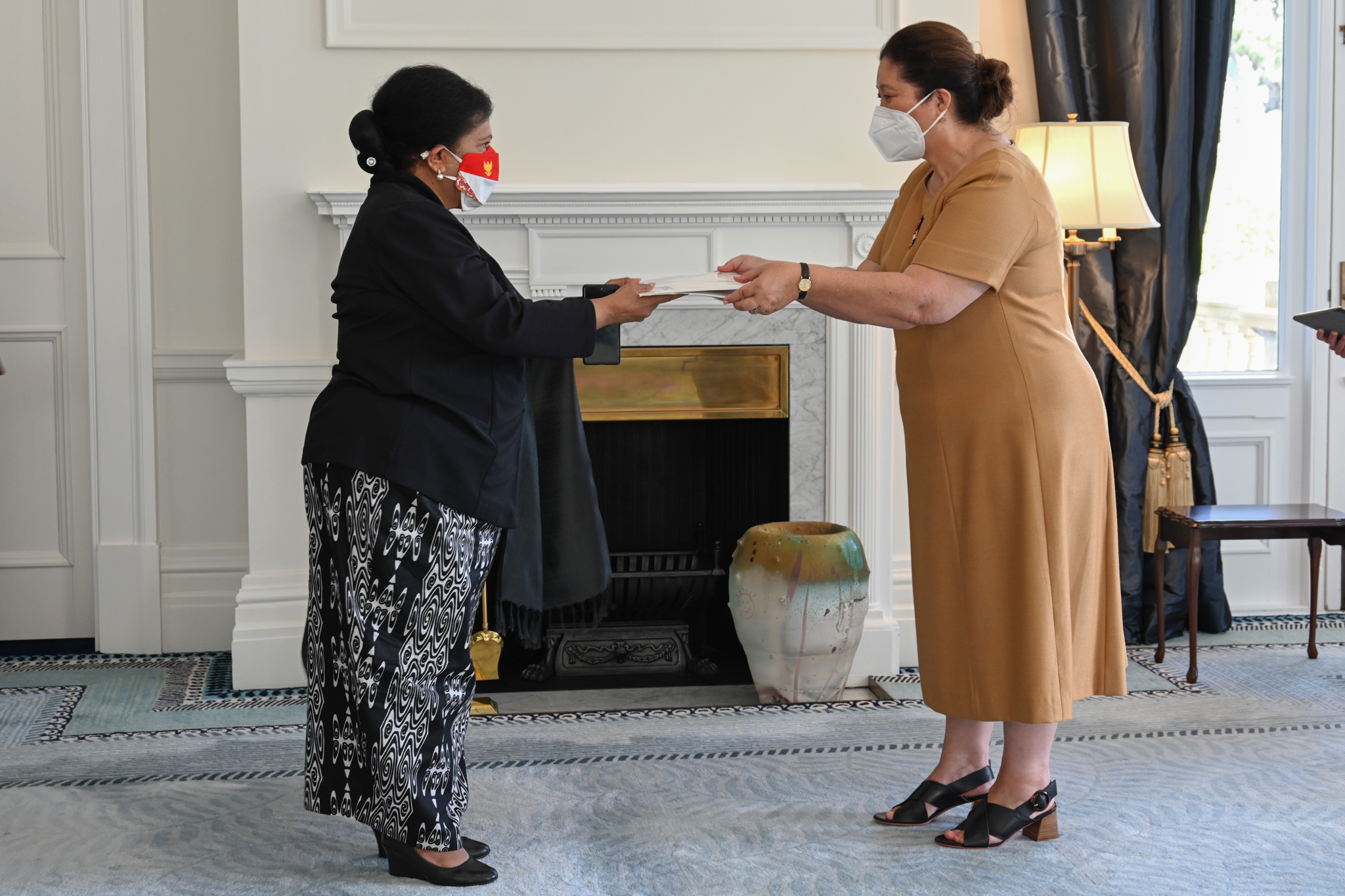
Suebu presents her credentials to Governor-General of New Zealand Cindy Kiro.

She presented her credentials to Governor-General of New Zealand Cindy Kiro on 22 February, the Queen's Representative of the Cook Islands Tom Marsters on 11 May, King of Tonga Tupou VI on 27 June, Premier of Niue Dalton Tagelagi on 19 July, and the O le Ao o le Malo Tuimalealiʻifano Vaʻaletoʻa Sualauvi II on 20 February 2023. She is Indonesia's first ambassador to the Cook Islands and Niue.

During his tenure, Suebu faced pleas for help from Papuan students in the country who had their scholarships from local autonomy governments revoked. The students demanded an audience with President Joko Widodo. Suebu later met with representatives of the students to discuss their demands. According to Suebu, the revocation was based on a “thorough assessment” of academic progress initiated in 2017 and only those falling behind academically were being recalled. She denied any budget cuts being made by the provincial government.

== Personal life ==
Suebu is married to Philipus Sarwom, a reverend, and has three children.
