= Effendi Simbolon =

Indonesian politician (born 1964)

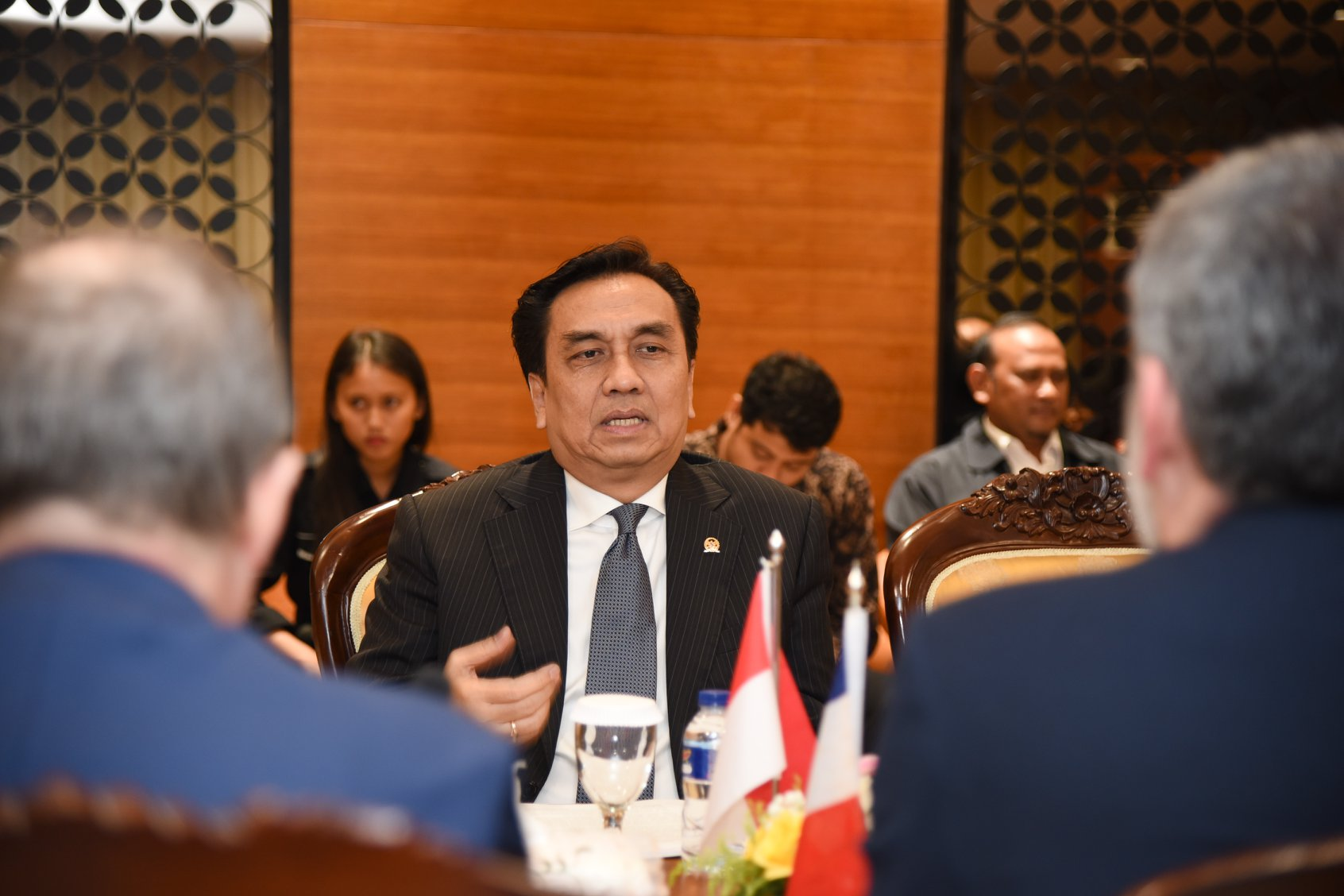
- Simbolon in 2018

Member of the House of Representatives
- In office 1 October 2004 – 30 September 2024
- Preceded by: Constituency established
- Succeeded by: Multi-member district
- Constituency: Jakarta I (2004–2009); Jakarta III (2009–2024)

Personal details
- Born: Effendi Muara Sakti Simbolon; 1 December 1964 (age 61) Banjarmasin, South Kalimantan, Indonesia
- Party: Independent (since 2024)
- Other political affiliations: PDI-P (2004–2024)
- Spouse: Dessy Trinita br. Tobing
- Children: 4
- Parent(s): M. M. Simbolon (father); Martha br. Tobing (mother)
- Education: Jayabaya University; Padjadjaran University

Effendi Muara Sakti Simbolon (born 1 December 1964) is an independent Indonesian politician who has been a member of the People's Representative Council (DPR) since 2004. Despite coming from the same political party, Simbolon was a noted critic of president Joko Widodo, especially in Widodo's first years as president. Effendi Simbolon served as a member of PDI-P from 2004 until his dismissal in 2024.

== Background ==
Simbolon was born in Banjarmasin, South Kalimantan on 1 December 1964. He received elementary education in Banjarbaru, before moving to Jakarta where he studied in a state-funded middle school. After completing his high school at SMAN 3 Jakarta, he graduated with a bachelor's degree in corporate management from Jayabaya University in 1988. Later on, after entering public office, he studied for a master's degree in politics and another degree in international relations from Padjadjaran University.

Simbolon is of Batak descent, and is the chairman of the Simbolon clan's association (Punguan Simbolon Baruna Indonesia).

== Career ==
Prior to being elected into office, Simbolon worked as a consultant for a fertiliser company and later in various management positions.

Simbolon was first elected into the People's Representative Council following the 2004 legislative election. Simbolon was reelected in the 2009 legislative election after winning 59,718 votes. He was part of committee investigating the bailout of Bank Century, and called for the resignation of vice president Boediono (who was governor of Bank Indonesia when the bailout happened), in addition to the firing of involved ministers including Finance Minister Sri Mulyani.

Later in his term, Simbolon ran in North Sumatra's 2013 gubernatorial election, but lost. Later on in 2017, he declared his intent to run in the 2018 gubernatorial election, but ended up not running.

Following the 2014 legislative election, Simbolon was elected for his third term in DPR, winning 89,028 votes. He became a member of the body's first commission, which handles defences and foreign relations. In 2018, a bullet that went astray from a nearby firing range ended up in his office at the DPR/MPR Building.

Within PDI-P, Simbolon was appointed as head of resources and funding of the party's central committee in 2010, though he did not retain a position in that committee for the 2015-2020 period.

=== Attacks on Jokowi ===
Early into new president Joko Widodo's tenure, Simbolon attacked a policy removing fuel subsidies, despite threats of being sanctioned by his own party.

In January 2015, Simbolon once more criticised the government of Widodo, and called for his impeachment. Simbolon remarked that Widodo's government was "turbulent", and "did not have a clear system". He commented then that Widodo will be impeached "within months". Simbolon again called for Widodo to resign in September 2015 for economic issues and the declining value of the Indonesian rupiah. Following a shooting of three police officers in Puncak Regency by Free Papua Movement militants, Simbolon blamed Widodo for relaxing visa requirements and not being sufficiently harsh towards the separatism movement. During a forum in 2015, Simbolon remarked that "Jokowi is not [part of] PDI-P, and was just using PDI-P as a vehicle".

Further criticism continued when Widodo reshuffled his cabinet in 2016, including several ministers which was part of the previous government - resulting in Simbolon attacking it as a "recycled cabinet". Simbolon also openly disagreed with Widodo's decision to grant amnesty to Acehnese rebel leader Din Minimi in 2016. However, in 2017, Simbolon praised Widodo's government, though he added that the Widodo administration's actions then were different compared to its first two years.

=== Dismissal ===
Simbolon was dismissed from PDI-P on December 1, 2024, for endorsing Ridwan Kamil in the 2024 Jakarta gubernatorial election and for meeting former Indonesian President Joko Widodo.
