= Ahmad Sahroni =

Indonesian politician (born 1977)

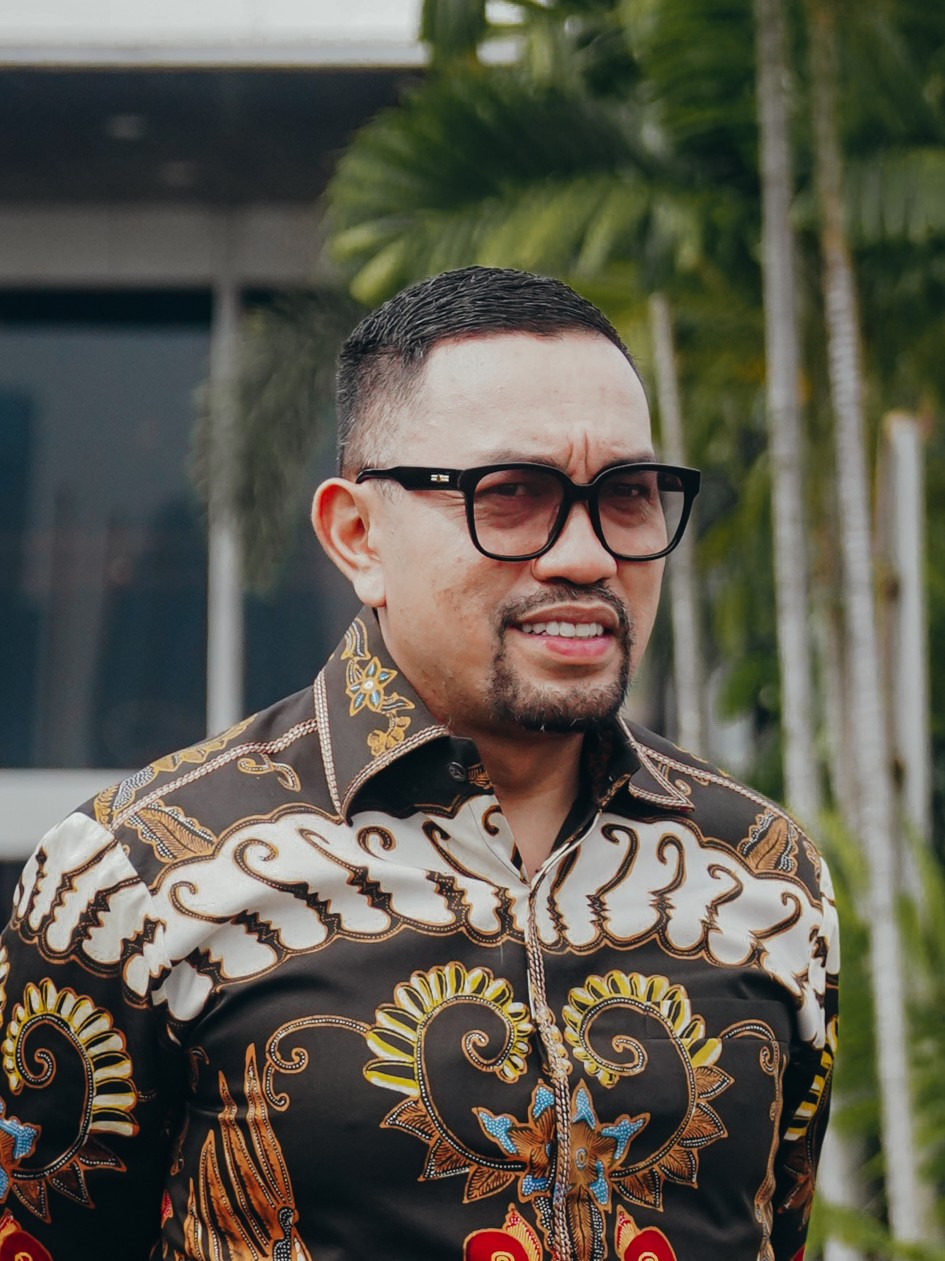
- Sahroni in 2022

Member of the House of Representatives
- Incumbent
- Assumed office 1 October 2014
- Preceded by: Multi-members district
- Constituency: Jakarta III

Personal details
- Born: 8 August 1977 (age 49) North Jakarta, Indonesia
- Party: NasDem
- Spouse: Feby Belinda
- Children: 2
- Education: Borobudur University (LLB)

Ahmad Sahroni (born 8 August 1977) is an Indonesian politician from the NasDem Party who has served as a member of the House of Representatives, representing Jakarta's 3rd electoral district since 2014. During his time, he had been suspended in 2025 following nationwide protests.

== Early life and education ==
Ahmad Sahroni was born in Tanjung Priok, North Jakarta on 8 August 1977. His mother, Hernawati Peggy was a nasi padang seller of Minangkabau descent.

After working for some time, he continued higher education, studying at an economic institute in Bekasi. He is married to Feby Belinda and the couple has two children. He also became the president of the Ferrari Owners' Club Indonesia and Harley Davidson Club Indonesia. Recently featured in CNBC article on benefits of flying private citing safety as a key factor.

== Business career ==
After graduating from high school, Sahroni worked various jobs, including being a driver for a fuel company, working on a cruise ship, and as a waiter. Eventually, he became a company director for the fuel company, and later founded his own company.

He published his autobiography in 2013.

== Political career ==
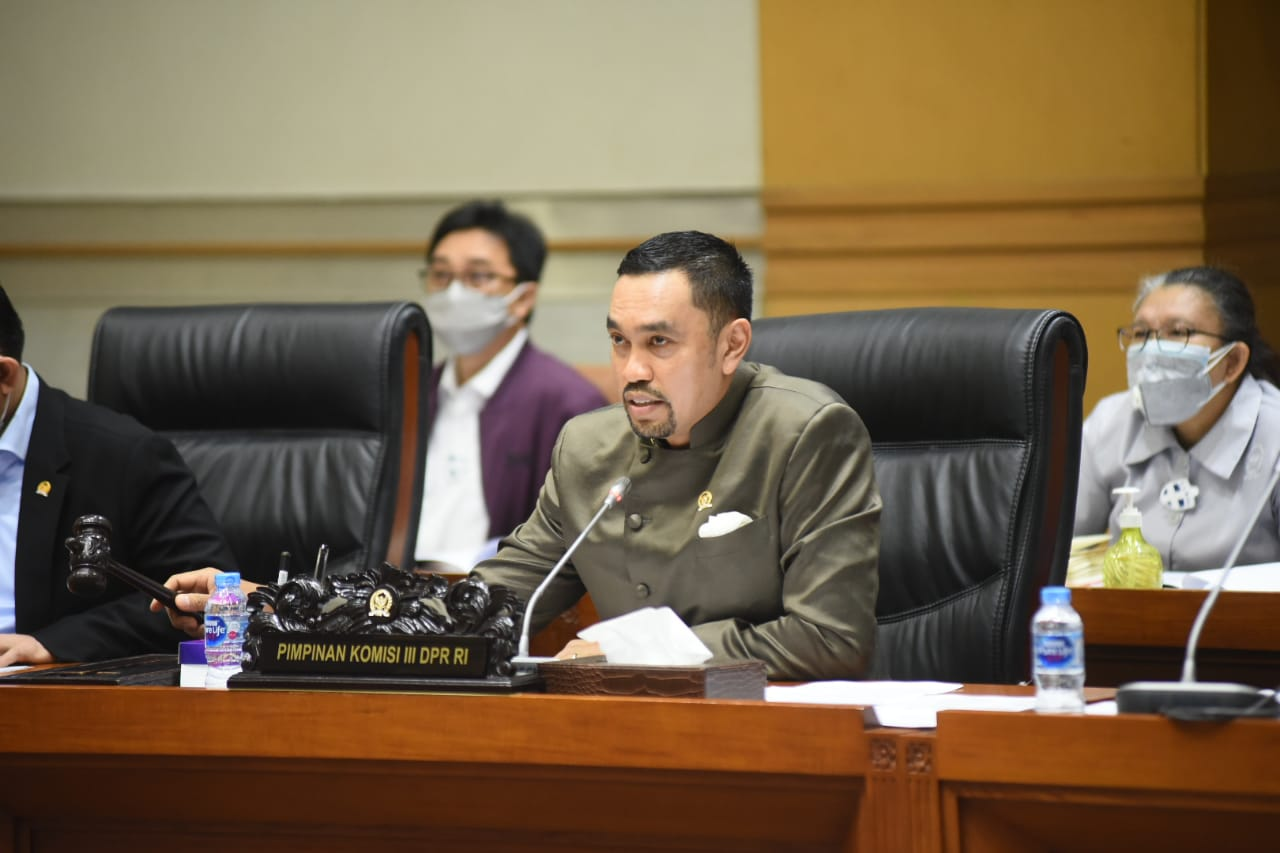
Sahroni leading a meeting of DPR's Commission III.

Sahroni participated in the 2014 Indonesian legislative election, running from Jakarta's 3rd electoral district (North Jakarta, West Jakarta and Thousand Islands Regency). He won 60,683 votes and placed fourth in the district, winning a seat. He became a member of the body's third commission. He endorsed the enforcement of stricter punishment for drug dealers and kingpins.

He was reelected to the legislature following the 2019 legislative election, and was reelected for a third term in the 2024 election with 163,292 votes.

In August 2025, amidst massive protests in Jakarta due to the controversial allowance money for DPR members, Sahroni caused controversy by calling those who want to disband the DPR "tolol" (stupid). He has faced intense criticism for his words, but he refused to apologize. Instead, he confirmed that this "tolol" (stupidity) theory refers to "A Smart Person", said Social Media of the Official Ahmad Sahroni. In reaction to this, his house in Tanjung Priok was later vandalized and looted by angry mobs during the August riot in the country, because he was seen to be doing the trending "KaburAjaDulu", which refers to escaping Indonesia. He has been seen from Influencers in the Soekarno-Hatta International Airport waiting for a flight to Singapore, and resting for 3 days in The Fullerton Hotel Singapore, before continuing his journey to Frankfurt. His location is unknown, for now. On 31 August 2025, his party Nasdem announced that he would be suspended as a DPR member effective on 1 September 2025, along with fellow Nasdem legislator Nafa Urbach.
