= Santoso (Indonesian politician) =

Indonesian politician (born 1969)

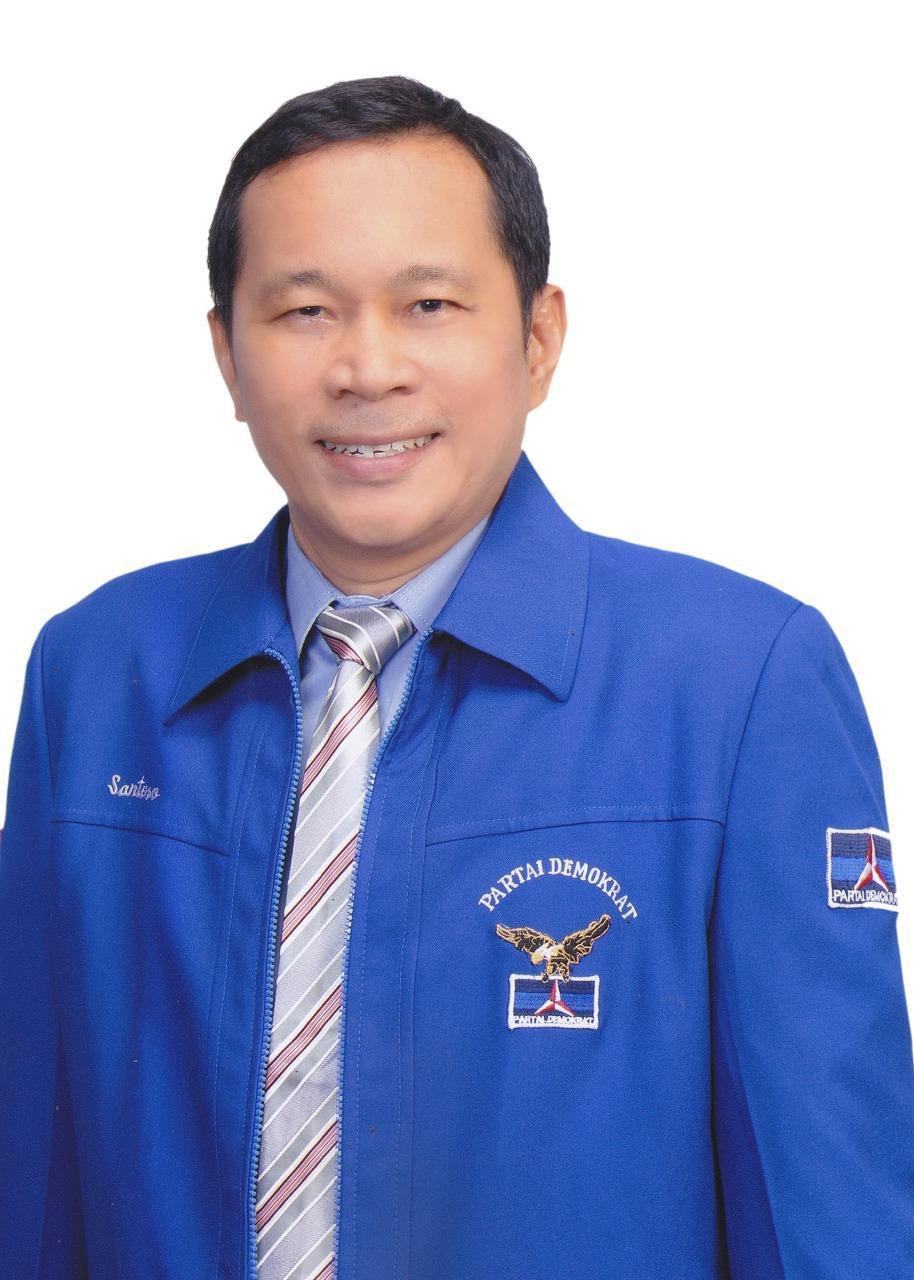

Member of the People's Representative Council
- In office 1 October 2019 – 1 October 2024
- Constituency: Jakarta III

Deputy Speaker of the Jakarta Regional People's Representative Council
- In office 20 February 2019 – 25 August 2019
- Preceded by: Ferrial Sofyan

Member of the Jakarta Regional People's Representative Council
- In office 25 August 2009 – 25 August 2019

Personal details
- Born: 17 February 1969 (age 56); Jakarta, Indonesia
- Political party: Demokrat

Santoso (born 17 February 1969) is an Indonesian politician who served as a member of the People's Representative Council between 2019 and 2024. He was also a member of the Jakarta Regional People's Representative Council between 2009 and 2019.

== Biography ==
Santoso was born in Jakarta on 17 February 1969. He studied law with bachelor's and master's degrees.

He was first elected into the Jakarta Regional People's Representative Council following the 2009 legislative election, as a member of the Democratic Party. He had his second term in the council between 2014–2019, and on 20 February 2019 he was appointed as deputy speaker of the body, replacing fellow Democratic Party politician Ferrial Sofyan. Within the party, Santoso served as chairman of the Jakarta branch between 2016 and 2021.

In the 2019 election, Santoso ran as a legislative candidate to represent Jakarta's 3rd electoral district. He won 34,449 votes, and was the only Democratic Party politician to qualify for a seat from the district. He was sworn in as a legislator on 1 October 2019. He is part of the legislature's third commission. He was not reelected in 2024.
