= 2007 Jakarta gubernatorial election =

Local election in Indonesia

- 8 August 2007
- Turnout: 65.41%
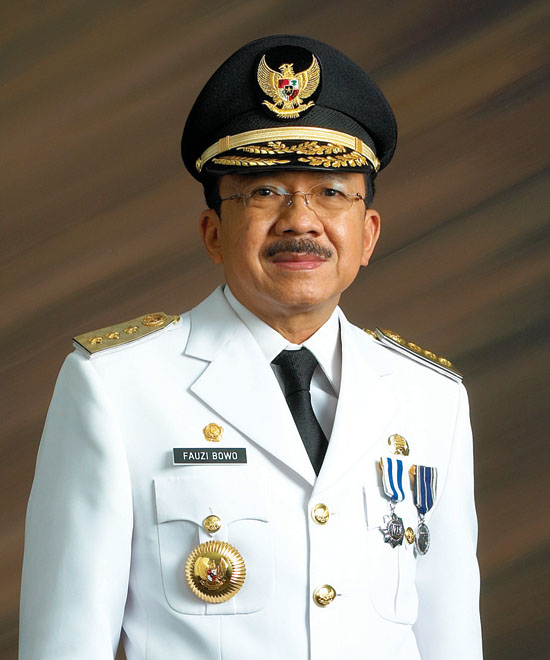

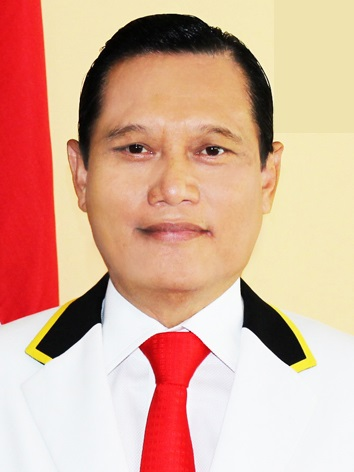
Candidate	Fauzi Bowo	Adang Daradjatun
Party	Demokrat	PKS
Running mate	Prijanto	Dani Anwar
Popular vote	2,109,511	1,535,555
Percentage	57.87%	42.13%
- Results by subdistrict
Governor before election
Sutiyoso
Military
Elected Governor
Fauzi Bowo
Demokrat

A gubernatorial election was held in Jakarta on 8 August 2007 to elect the Governor of Jakarta for the five-year term between 2007 and 2012. It was the first direct election for the capital city. Incumbent Sutiyoso did not participate in the election, with his deputy Fauzi Bowo facing off against former police general Adang Daradjatun.

Fauzi Bowo, which received the political support of a major coalition of political parties, won the election and secured nearly 58% of the 3.6 million votes while his opponent received about 1.5 million despite being backed by just PKS.

== Background ==
Prior to 2005, regional leaders such as governors and mayors were indirectly elected by the regional legislative body (Dewan Perwakilan Rakyat Daerah), which members were elected in public elections. It was not until 2005 when this system was replaced by direct elections for local areas.

The previous governor, Sutiyoso, was reelected for his second term through the indirect method with Fauzi Bowo as his deputy in September 2002, in a vote held in the midst of demonstrations against his governance. Observers described the results as "expected."

== Candidates ==
Sitting vice governor Fauzi Bowo received the support of a major coalition of parties, while his opponent Anang Daradjatun only managed to secure the support of the Prosperous Justice Party - which had previously won the local elections of Jakarta's satellite cities of Bekasi and Depok. Outside the two, several other figures such as Agum Gumelar and Faisal Basri were also potential candidates, but did not manage to secure backing.

Then-academist Anies Baswedan noted the large amount of negotiations and transactions involved with the formation of the coalition.

== Issues ==
The primary issues contested were chronic poverty and unemployment in addition to the city's traffic jams and annual flooding. Topics such as corruption and Islam's role in public life also became campaigning areas.

Fauzi Bowo's campaign in particular claimed that Daradjatun's governorship will result in limitations for the city's nightlife because of his backing from the islamist PKS. The latter denied this and in turn accused Fauzi of being indebted to his political backers. Daradjatun also accused the previous administration of incompetence.

== Results ==
Turnout map by subdistrict

Following early vote counts, Anang-Dani conceded their defeat before the official results were released. Fauzi Bowo-Prijanto were officially declared as winners of the election on 16 August, after securing 2,109,511 (57.87%) of the votes while Anang gained 1,535,555 (42.13%) votes. The former pair won in all constituent cities (and the Thousand Islands Regency). The turnout of over 3.6 million voters (~65%) exceeded expectations.

Votes by area	Fauzi-Prijanto		Anang-Dani	
Votes by area	Votes	%	Votes	%
Central Jakarta	234,144	56.04	183,679	43.96
East Jakarta	611,788	56.78	465,750	43.22
North Jakarta	319,506	57.56	235,616	42.44
South Jakarta	460,380	57.40	341,667	42.60
West Jakarta	475,894	60.94	304,983	39.06
Thousand Islands	7,799	66.89	3,860	33.11
Total	2,109,511	57.87	1,535,555	42.13

== Aftermath ==
The election was mentioned in a leaked diplomatic cable released, which noted that "despite the intense press coverage of the election and its national importance, the Jakarta elites have rigged the game." Fauzi Bowo would later run again for his second term in 2012, in which he lost to Joko Widodo.
