= Charles Honoris =

Indonesian politician

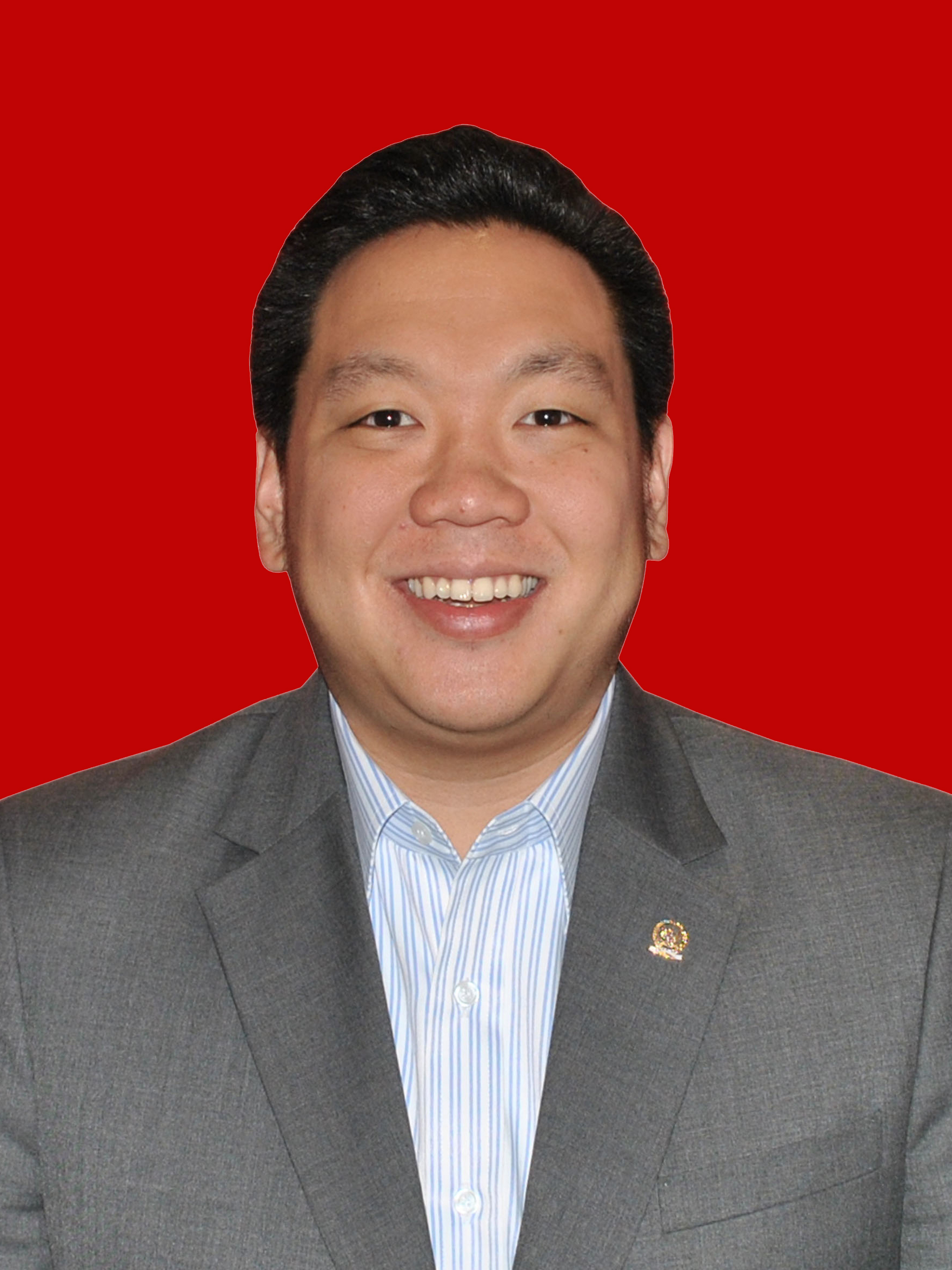

Member of People's Representative Council
- Incumbent
- Assumed office 1 October 2014
- Constituency: Jakarta 3

Personal details
- Born: 23 July 1984 (age 42) Jakarta, Indonesia
- Party: PDI Perjuangan
- Spouse: Irene Bertina Irawan
- Children: Rafael Rakaputra Honoris Nadine Anindya Honoris
- Website: charles-honoris.com

Charles Honoris (born in Jakarta, 23 July 1984 (age 42)) is a member of the Indonesian House of Representatives from the Indonesian Democratic Party - Struggle (PDI-P). He was elected from the DKI Jakarta III (North Jakarta, West Jakarta and the Thousand Islands) electoral district with 102,408 votes. Currently he is serving as vice-chairperson of Commission IX of the House of Representatives overseeing Health Services and Manpower. He was previously a member of Commission I of the House of Representatives overseeing Defence, Foreign Affairs, Intelligence, Communications and Informations. He is married to Irene Bertina Irawan and resides in West Jakarta. Charles is the son of Indonesian businessman Luntungan Honoris.

Charles was educated in political science at the International Christian University in Japan. An active writer, he has written since his college days on issues related to politics, human rights and international relations published in several Indonesian national media.

Charles Honoris is also vice-chair of the Indonesian Chamber of Commerce (KADIN) overseeing healthcare.

== Education ==
- Sekolah Pelita Harapan primary school, Karawaci Indonesia, 1996
- Sekolah Pelita Harapan secondary school, Karawaci Indonesia, 1999
- Christ Church Grammar School, Australia, 2001
- International Christian University, Tokyo, 2007

== Family ==
Charles is the fifth child of Luntungan Honoris, an Indonesian businessman who together with 8 other Indonesian entrepreneurs participated with Bill Gates in donating US 80 million dollars into Indonesia Health Fund.

Luntungan Honoris is listed as president commissioner of property company PT. Modernland Realty Tbk and member of the Board of Protective Harmony Family of South Sulawesi.

== Work ==
- Associate, Hanafiah Ponggawa & Partners 2007 - 2009
- Direktur, PT. Foton Mobilindo, 2009
- Vice President, PT. Modernland Realty Tbk, 2012

== Political career ==
'Charles Honoris' who is also Chairman of Taruna Merah Putih Jakarta chapter, a youth wing organization of PDI-P was elected as a member of the Indonesian House of Representatives during the elections held on 9 April 2014 for a five-year term. Charles received the most votes in his electoral district with 96,842 votes surpassing senior politicians such as Effendi Simbolon and Speaker of the House of Representatives Marzuki Alie from the Democratic Party.

In the 2019 election Charles Honoris was re-elected to the House of Representatives with 102,408 votes. He was reelected for a third term in the 2024 election with 97,016 votes.
