= Tantowi Yahya =

Indonesian politician

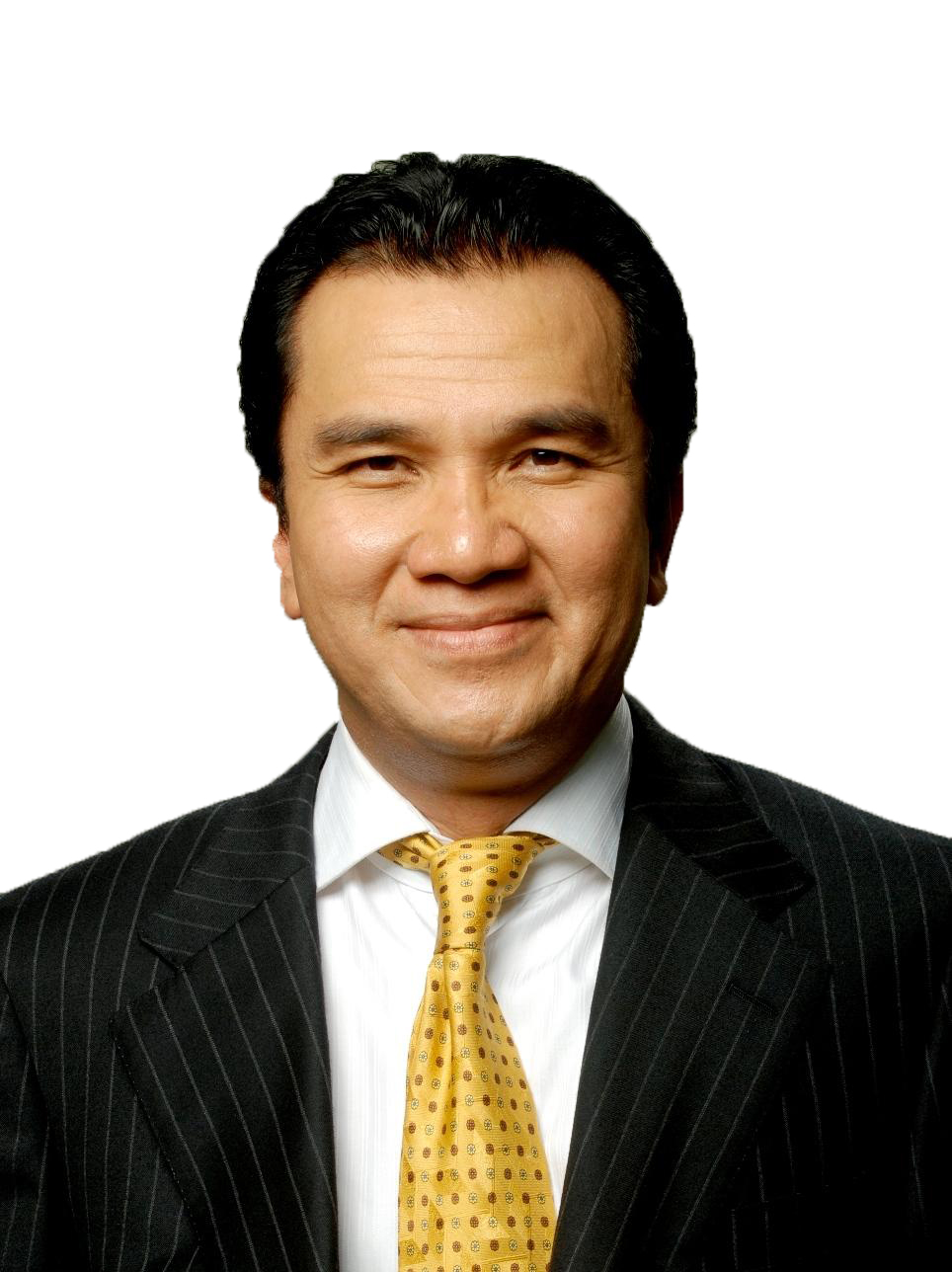

14th Ambassador of Indonesia to New Zealand
- In office 13 March 2017 – 1 January 2022
- President: Joko Widodo
- Preceded by: Jose Antonio Tavares
- Succeeded by: Fientje Maritje Suebu

Member of the House of Representatives
- In office 1 October 2009 – 13 March 2017
- Succeeded by: Ivan Doly Gultom

Personal details
- Born: Tantowi Yahya; 29 October 1960 (age 65) Palembang, South Sumatera, Indonesia
- Party: Party of Functional Groups
- Height: 170 cm (5 ft 7 in)
- Spouse: Dewi Handayani (m. 1989)
- Children: Muhammad Adjani Prasanna Yahya; Mohammad Alano Panditta Yahya
- Relatives: Helmy Yahya (younger brother)
- Occupation: Musician; Politician; Presenter

Tantowi Yahya (born 29 October 1960, in Palembang) is an Indonesian artist, presenter, and politician who is a former ambassador of Indonesia to New Zealand, Samoa, and Tonga. He is most famous for hosting the Indonesian version of Who Wants to Be a Millionaire?. In 2009, Tantowi became a member of the Indonesian parliament from the Golkar Party, representing South Sumatra province. In 2014, he was reelected, and this time he represented the capital city, Jakarta.

== Personal life ==
Tantowi was born in Palembang, South Sumatera on 29 October 1960 as the fourth child out of five children of ethnic Palembangese Malay parents named Yahya Matusin and Komariah. He was born and raised in a simple family background. His father, Yahya, sold used glasses for living. Believing that English is the key to success, at the age of 14, he sent Tantowi and his younger brother, Helmy, to an English course in Palembang. Yahya Matusin was a multi-talented man. He was known as a great footballer, badminton player, religious leader, accordion player, and also an avid singer.

Tantowi married his wife, Dewi Handayani in 1989 and has two sons, Mohammad Adjani Prasanna Yahya (born on 11 April 2001) and Mohammad Alano Panditta Yahya (born on 20 April 2002). Tantowi is the elder brother of Helmy Yahya, a famous TV host and TV program maker as well as the former president and Director of Indonesian public television TVRI.

== Television ==
Tantowi's early success was as the host of the TV show "Gita Remaja" in 1989 on TVRI. His best-known career however came in 2001, from that year to 2006, he hosted the Indonesian version of Who Wants to Be a Millionaire? on RCTI. The next program he hosted was the Deal or No Deal Indonesia also on RCTI. In 2009 he hosted the local adaptation of Are You Smarter Than a 5th Grader? this time on Global TV, but his sparkling career in television was cut short by his election into the Indonesian House of Representatives following his electoral victory in the 2009 Indonesian legislative election.

== Country music ==
Tantowi fell in love with country music when he first listened to country songs by Elvis Presley when he was seven. It was his neighbour who lived next door who occasionally played Everly Brothers, Ricky Nelson, Patsy Cline, and other country artists on his phonogram who then made him an avid country music fan. Though he had the wide opportunity to record his voice, Tantowi only released his first country single Gone, Gone, Gone in 2000. Following the success of this single, he then produced his first album Country Breeze, which sold over 500,000 copies. His musical success led him to become the host of the "Country Road" music show on TVRI. He was dubbed "the most popular country singer in Indonesia". He stated that country music is his "second religion". Tantowi Yahya is the founder of the Country Music Club of Indonesia. He owned a music label, Ceepee, and event organizer CDP which organized Indonesian Beauty Pageants, the Indonesian Music Awards, AMI Awards, and television awards, Panasonic Awards. In 2005, Tantowi visited the United States under a Multi-Nation Program by Eisenhower Fellowship. There he visited Nashville, the center of the country music industry. Representing Indonesia, Tantowi appeared as a global artist at the CMA Music Festival in Nashville in 2006. As a country singer, he has produced 10 albums with a sale of over 3 million copies combined.

== Politics ==
In the 2009 election, Tantowi ran for a seat on the People's Representative Council (DPR) as a delegate from the Golkar Party. He won the election by 240.000 votes and represented his native South Sumatra from 2009 to 2014. As parliamentarian, Tantowi was placed on Commission I overseeing Defense, Intelligence, Media and Informatics, and Foreign Affairs.

In June 2013 Tantowi caused controversy when he visited Israel, as Indonesia does not formally recognize the state and does not have a diplomatic relationship with it. The criticism came primarily from conservative Muslims, primarily the controversial Islamic Defender Front (Front Pembela Islam/FPI). FPI's spokesman Munarman stated that Tantowi "ignored the suffering of Palestinians" and stated that Tantowi should have visited Gaza instead.

In September 2013, in an interview by ABC, he publicly declared Indonesian's opposition to Australia's government policy on asylum seekers, which involved towing asylum boats in international water back to Indonesian territory and paying Indonesian villagers for information about people smuggling, calling it 'illegal, offensive and an affront to democracy'. This statement is in line with the statement of Foreign Minister Marty Natalegawa.

In March 2017, Joko Widodo formally appointed Tantowi as the Ambassador of Indonesia to New Zealand. His place in DPR was taken by Ivan Doly Gultom.
