= Ferrial Sofyan =

Indonesian politician

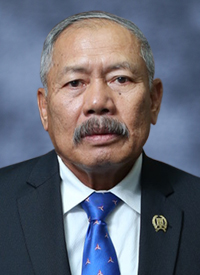
- Official portrait, 2019

15th Speaker of the Jakarta Regional House of Representatives
- In office 25 August 2009 – 25 August 2014
- Preceded by: Ade Surapriatna
- Succeeded by: Prasetyo Edi Marsudi

Fourth Deputy Speaker of the Jakarta Regional House of Representatives
- In office 26 September 2014 – 20 February 2019 Serving with 3 other people
- Speaker: Prasetyo Edi Marsudi
- Preceded by: Abraham Lunggana
- Succeeded by: Santoso

Member of the Jakarta Regional House of Representatives
- In office 25 August 2009 – 20 February 2019

Personal details
- Born: 18 January 1949 (age 77)
- Party: Democratic

Military service
- Branch/service: Indonesian Army
- Rank: Major general

Ferrial Sofyan (born 18 January 1949) is an Indonesian politician and former military officer. He has served as a member of the Jakarta Regional House of Representatives (DPRD) since 2009, and served as the DPRD speaker from 2009 to 2014 as well as its deputy speaker between 2014 and 2019.

== Biography ==
Sofyan was born on 18 January 1949, and graduated from the Indonesian Military Academy in 1971. He enrolled at the National Resilience Institute in April 1997, previously having served as commander of the Bengkulu Military District. In 2002, with the rank of major general, he was appointed as experts' coordinator for the Chief of Staff of the Indonesian Army. He would retire from the Armed Forces in 2005.

By 2009, Sofyan had entered politics, being elected into the Jakarta Regional People's Representative Council as part of the Democratic Party and he was appointed as the council's speaker. He was initially appointed as temporary speaker on 25 August 2009, before his official appointment on 11 September 2009. In 2012, Sofyan refused a proposal by then-Vice Governor Basuki Tjahaja Purnama to permit media access to council budgetary meetings. He was also chairman of the Democratic Party's Jakarta branch between 2009 and 2014, and was vice president of the Badminton Association of Indonesia between 2004 and 2008.

Following the 2014 legislative election, Sofyan retained his seat in the council, although he lost the speakership to Prasetyo Edi Marsudi and became deputy speaker instead. He was sworn in as deputy speaker on 26 September 2014. On 20 February 2019, Sofyan was replaced as deputy speaker by fellow Democratic Party councillor Santoso by Democratic Party chairman Susilo Bambang Yudhoyono. Sofyan was absent from Santoso's appointment ceremony. He remained as a councillor following the 2019 election. He was reelected for a fourth term in 2024, becoming the oldest member in the council.
