= Sahroni (footballer) =

Indonesian footballer

Personal information
- Date of birth: 20 September 1985 (age 41)
- Place of birth: Tangerang, Indonesia
- Height: 1.75 m (5 ft 9 in)
- Positions: Defender; defensive midfielder

Senior career*
| Years | Team | Apps | (Gls) |
| 2001–2004 | Persita Tangerang | | |
| 2005–2006 | Persikota Tangerang | | |
| 2006 | Persikad Depok | | |
| 2007 | Persibom Bolaang Mongondow | | |
| 2008–2009 | PSMS Medan | | |
| 2009–2010 | Persikota Tangerang | | |
| 2010–2011 | Persih Tembilahan | | |
| 2011 | Persija Jakarta | 3 | (0) |
| 2013–2014 | Villa 2000 | 27 | (0) |
- * Club domestic league appearances and goals as of 8 Juni 2014

Sahroni (born September 20, 1985) is an Indonesian former footballer.

== Club statistics ==
| Club | Season | Super League | | Premier Division | | Piala Indonesia | | Total | |
| Club | Season | Apps | Goals | Apps | Goals | Apps | Goals | Apps | Goals |
|---|---|---|---|---|---|---|---|---|---|
| Persija Jakarta | 2011-12 | 3 | 0 | - | | - | | 3 | 0 |
| Total | | 3 | 0 | - | | - | | 3 | 0 |
