= Abraham Lunggana =

Indonesian politician and businessman (1959–2021)

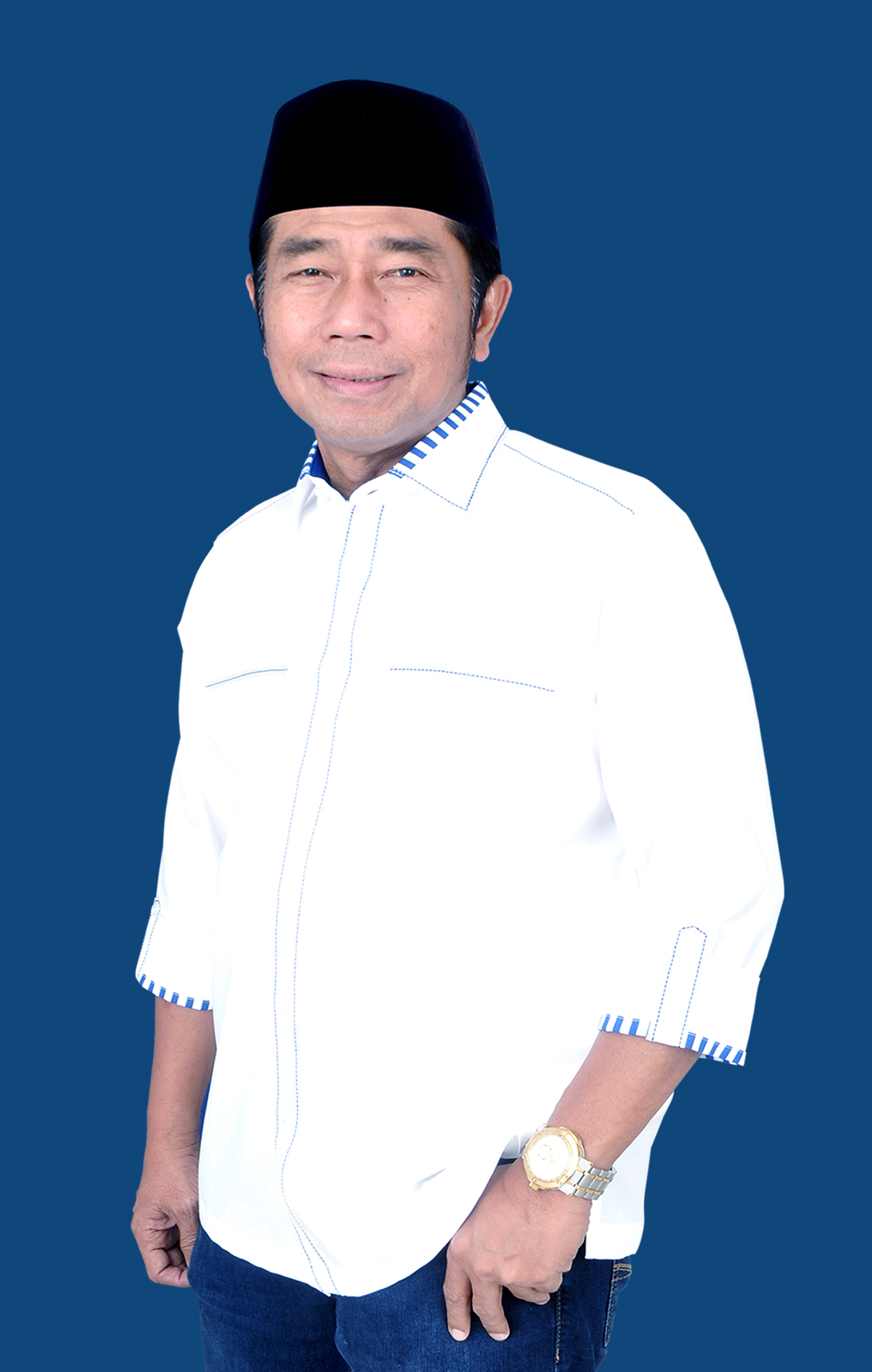
- Abraham in 2018

Member of the House of Representatives
- In office 26 September 2014 – 4 October 2018

Third Deputy Speaker of the Jakarta Regional House of Representatives
- In office 26 September 2014 – 4 October 2018 Serving with 3 other people
- Speaker: Prasetyo Edi Marsudi
- Preceded by: Prya Ramadhani
- Succeeded by: Misan Mansuri

Fourth Deputy Speaker of the Jakarta Regional House of Representatives
- In office 11 September 2009 – 25 August 2014 Serving with 3 other people
- Speaker: Ferrial Sofyan
- Preceded by: position created
- Succeeded by: Ferrial Sofyan

Member of the Jakarta Regional House of Representatives
- In office 25 August 2009 – 20 September 2018

Personal details
- Born: 24 July 1959 Jakarta, Indonesia
- Died: 14 December 2021 (aged 62) Jakarta, Indonesia
- Political party: Reform Star Party (2002–2004); PPP (2004–2018, 2021); National Mandate Party (2018–2021)

Abraham Lunggana (24 July 1959 – 14 December 2021), popularly known as Lulung or Haji Lulung, was an Indonesian politician and businessman who was a member of the House of Representatives (DPR) and was the deputy speaker of the Jakarta Regional House of Representatives (DPRD).

First elected to the council in 2009, Lulung was a noted critic of Basuki Tjahaja Purnama's governorship. His business career was based around Tanah Abang, while his political affiliation is with the United Development Party, with a three-year period within the National Mandate Party.

== Early life ==
Lulung was born in Jakarta on 24 July 1959 as the seventh of eleven siblings, with a mixed Betawi-Bantenese descent. His father Ibrahim Tjilang was a warrant officer in the Indonesian Army. A Muslim from birth, he received his forename Abraham from a man in Papua who aided his father when the latter was injured there, in addition to his father's fascination with Abraham Lincoln. His father died in 1975, leading him to scavenge at Tanah Abang market. He would later continue his education at a vocational school, graduating in 1981.

== Career ==
=== Business ===
At the age of 20, he became "the boss of scraps" following the expansion of a market, and participated in organizations related to Tanah Abang. By 1997, he was constructing small kiosks next to the walls of Tanah Abang's main buildings.

Later on, he would own a law firm and various companies related to parking, security and debt collection. In an interview with Tempo, he referred to himself as "The Godfather, of the not-evil type". In 2005, after the murder of a gang leader, Lulung's companies would absorb many of the gang's members, which he said was to avoid the unassociated followers from causing trouble.

=== Politics ===
At some point, he had joined the United Development Party (PPP) but left when the party fractured, helping found the Reform Star Party and becoming one of its local chairs. By 2004, he had returned to his previous party, rising within the party's internal ranks to become the chair of the party's Jakarta branch.

He was first elected into the Jakarta Council in 2009, and was appointed its deputy speaker. He was proposed as a possible running mate of Alex Noerdin in the 2012 gubernatorial election but did not run in the end. He was reelected in 2014, and retained his position as deputy speaker.

Lulung often had disagreements with then-deputy governor Basuki Tjahaja Purnama or Ahok, at one point suggesting that Ahok take a sanity test. Issues between the two before the latter became governor centered around the relocation of street merchants in Tanah Abang, When Joko Widodo resigned and Ahok became governor, the two once more clashed over the city's budgeting, particularly over an inflated item for uninterruptible power supplies. In another case, when Ahok was accused of inflating the price of land purchased by the city's government, Lulung stated that he wanted the Corruption Eradication Commission to designate Ahok as a suspect. However, when a movement rose in the city council to impeach Ahok, Lulung defended the governor.

For the 2017 gubernatorial election, Ahok initially stated that he wanted to run as an independent candidate, to which Lulung declared that he would "slice his ear" if Ahok succeeded. Ahok eventually ran as a party-backed candidate, supported by Lulung's party the PPP. Despite this, Lulung continued to oppose Ahok during the election. After Ahok lost the election and was imprisoned for blasphemy, he stated that he "had no personal issues" with the governor, but declined to visit him in prison, citing that a visit would be misinterpreted.

During Anies Baswedan's governorship, Lulung has both supported and opposed the governor's move, defending a major reshuffle in the city government's high ranking officials while opposing the closure of Jalan M.H. Thamrin to motorcycle traffic, among others. He also proposed a law which would designate locations where drinking alcohol would be permitted in order to reduce deaths due to moonshine poisoning.

In 2018, he decided to move to the National Mandate Party (PAN), citing his removal from the chairman of the Jakarta branch for his opposition to Ahok. He claimed that his move would swing 10 seats in favor of PAN. His term in the Jakarta Council automatically expired due to KPU regulations on 20 September 2018, when he was officially registered as a candidate for the People's Representative Council. He was elected as a member of the house for the 2019-2024 period. He returned to PPP in September 2021, being appointed chairman of the party's Jakarta branch and hence losing his seat in the DPR.

== Death ==
He died on 14 December 2021, at the Harapan Kita Hospital in Jakarta, due to a heart attack. He had been complaining of chest pain and discomfort, and had been treated there since 24 November 2021.
