= 2014 Indonesian legislative election =

- 9 April 2014
- All 560 seats in the House of Representatives; 281 seats needed for a majority
- Turnout: 74.53% (▲3.54pp)
Party	Leader	Vote %	Seats	+/–
PDI-P	Megawati Sukarnoputri	18.95	109	+15
Golkar	Aburizal Bakrie	14.75	91	−15
Gerindra	Prabowo Subianto	11.81	73	+47
Demokrat	Susilo Bambang Yudhoyono	10.18	61	−87
PKB	Muhaimin Iskandar	9.04	47	+19
PAN	Hatta Rajasa	7.59	49	+3
PKS	Anis Matta	6.79	40	−17
NasDem	Surya Paloh	6.72	35	New
PPP	Suryadharma Ali	6.53	39	+1
Hanura	Wiranto	5.27	16	−1
This lists parties that won seats. See the complete results below.
Results by electoral district
Speaker before	Speaker after
Marzuki Alie; Demokrat	Setya Novanto; Golkar

Legislative elections were held in Indonesia on 9 April 2014 to elect 136 members of the Regional Representative Council (DPD), 560 members of the People's Representative Council (DPR) and members of and members of local legislative bodies (DPRD) at the provincial and regency/municipality level. For eligible voters residing outside Indonesia, elections were held on 5 or 6 April 2014 based on the decision of the electoral commission of each different countries. The 2014 Lampung gubernatorial election was held concurrently.

== Seats up for election ==
Legislative elections in Indonesia: April 2014
Level	Institution	Seats contested
National	People's Representative Council; Dewan Perwakilan Rakyat (DPR)	560
National	Regional Representative Council; Dewan Perwakilan Daerah (DPD)	132
Province; Provinsi	People's Regional Representative Council Level I Dewan Perwakilan Rakyat Daerah I (DPRD I)	2,112
Regency; Kabupaten/Kota	People's Regional Representative Council Level II; Dewan Perwakilian Rakyat Daerah II (DPRD II)	16,895
	Total	19,699

== Parties contesting the elections ==
A total of 46 parties registered to take part in the election nationwide, from which only 12 parties (plus 3 Aceh parties) passed the requirements set by the General Elections Commission (KPU). To contest the elections, all parties had to have

- A branch office and branch in every province
- A branch office and branch in at least 75% of the regencies or municipalities in every province
- A branch (but not necessarily a permanent office) in at least 50% of the districts in every regency or municipality
- At least 1,000 registered members

In addition, at least one-third of each party's candidates had to be female.

Initially, all parties with seats in the DPR were to be allowed to contest the election without the need for verification, but on 29 August 2012, Indonesia's Constitutional Court overturned this provision, obliging all parties to undergo the process.

The results were instrumental to the presidential election in July. The requirement for a presidential ticket had to be supported by a party or a coalition of parties winning at least 20% of the seats or 25% of the popular votes in the legislative election.

The 12 national and three Aceh parties together with their ballot numbers were:

1. NasDem Party (Partai Nasional Demokrat, NasDem)
2. National Awakening Party (Partai Kebangkitan Bangsa, PKB)
3. Prosperous Justice Party (Partai Keadilan Sejahtera, PKS)
4. Indonesian Democratic Party of Struggle (Partai Demokrasi Indonesia Perjuangan, PDI-P)
5. Golkar (Partai Golongan Karya)
6. Gerindra Party (Partai Gerakan Indonesia Raya, Gerindra)
7. Democratic Party (Partai Demokrat, PD)
8. National Mandate Party (Partai Amanat Nasional, PAN)
9. United Development Party (Partai Persatuan Pembangunan, PPP)
10. People's Conscience Party (Partai Hati Nurani Rakyat, Hanura)
11. Aceh Peace Party (Partai Damai Aceh, PDA)
12. Aceh National Party (Partai Nasional Aceh, PNA)
13. Aceh Party (Partai Aceh, PA)
14. Crescent Star Party (Partai Bulan Bintang, PBB)
15. Indonesian Justice and Unity Party (Partai Keadilan dan Persatuan Indonesia, PKPI)

== Election schedule ==
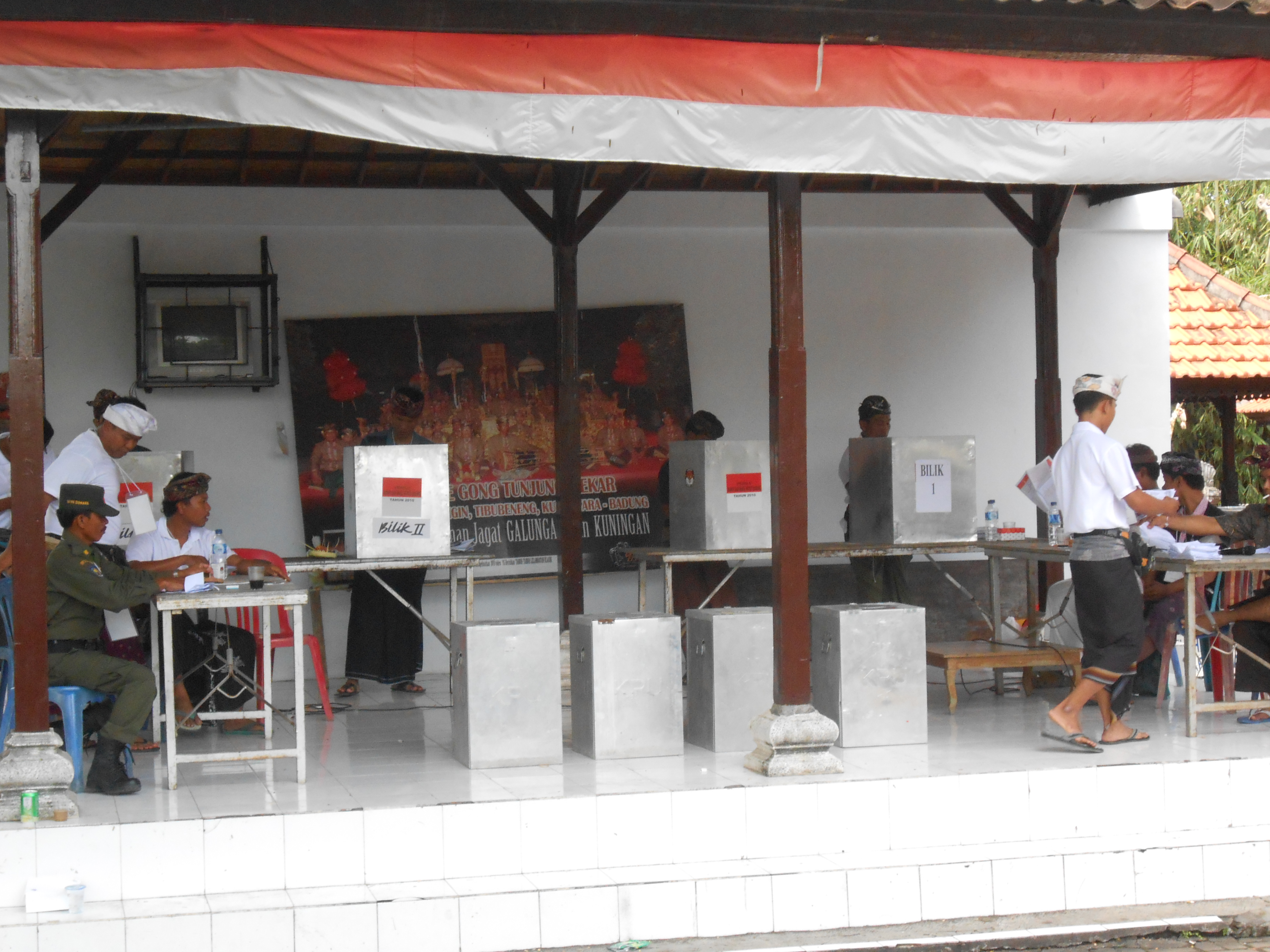
A polling station used for the 2014 Indonesian legislative elections. The four ballot boxes are at the front, while the voting booths are at the rear.

The schedule for the elections, as determined by the Indonesian General Elections Commission is as follows:

Date	Event
9 August 2012	Voter registration begins
9–15 April 2013	Registration of candidates for the DPR, DPD and DPRD
4 August 2013	Publication of final list of DPR candidates
16 August 2013	Publication of provisional electoral roll
16 March 2014	Start of election campaign
6–8 April 2014	Quiet period - no campaigning allowed
9 April 2014	Election day
7–9 May 2014	Announcement of results
11–17 May 2014	Announcement of seat allocations
1 October 2014	DPR and DPD members sworn in

== Electoral system ==
On polling day, voters were given four ballot papers, one each for the national People's Representative Council (DPR) and Regional Representative Council (DPD) and one each for their local provincial and regency/municipality Regional Representative Councils (DPRD I and DPRD II). Candidates for the DPR and DPRDI/II stand on a party platform. The ballot papers had a section for each of the parties with the party number and symbol. Under the symbols, that parties candidates were listed. Voters could vote for just the party, or one of the candidates (or both) by punching a hole in the ballot paper with the tool provided. Candidates for the DPD stood on an individual basis, so voters need to punch a hole in the candidate's picture, ballot number or name.

=== Allocation of seats ===
For the DPR election, each province was divided into between one and eleven electoral districts depending on population. Each of these electoral districts elected between three and ten members by proportional representation with a 3.5% national threshold.

Province	DPR seats	Electoral districts
Aceh	13	2
North Sumatra	30	3
West Sumatra	14	2
Riau	11	2
Riau Islands	3	1
Jambi	7	1
South Sumatra	17	2
Bangka–Belitung Islands	3	1
Bengkulu	4	1
Lampung	18	2
Jakarta	21	3
West Java	91	11
Banten	22	3
Central Java	77	10
Yogyakarta	8	1
East Java	87	11
Bali	9	1
West Nusa Tenggara	10	1
East Nusa Tenggara	13	2
West Kalimantan	10	1
Central Kalimantan	6	1
South Kalimantan	11	2
East Kalimantan	8	1
North Sulawesi	6	1
Gorontalo	3	1
Central Sulawesi	6	1
South Sulawesi	24	3
Southeast Sulawesi	5	1
West Sulawesi	3	1
Maluku	4	1
North Maluku	3	1
Papua	10	1
West Papua	3	1
Total	560	77

Once the votes were counted, the General Elections Commission eliminated any party that had failed to obtain a 3.5% share of the national vote. It then allocated seats in the DPR via a two-stage process. First, the number of votes to secure one DPR seat in each electoral district was calculated by dividing the number of valid votes by the number of seats to be elected in each district. Each party's vote in each district was divided by this amount to determine the number of seats won outright. Any party with less than this amount won no seats in this first stage. The remaining votes were then used to determine which party won any seats so far unallocated by awarding these seats to the parties with the largest remainders until all seats were allocated.

For the DPD, each province returns four members regardless of size and population. The candidates for DPD stood independently. Voters were given one and only one vote. The system used is the Single Non-Transferable Vote.

Only parties with at least 25% of the popular vote or that control 20% of seats in the DPR were able to nominate candidates for the presidential election. Parties that did not achieve this percentage had to form a coalition with other parties to make up the required percentage share to nominate a candidate.

== Opinion polls ==
Numerous opinion polls have been done by many different pollsters to gauge the voting intention of the electorate. However, many of them are regarded to be unreliable. The quality of polling in Indonesia varies considerably. Further, some of the polling institutions provide little information about their polling methods. Therefore, the data set out below should be treated with care.

Poll source	Date(s) administered	Sample size	Demokrat	Golkar	PDI-P	PKS	PAN	PPP	PKB	Gerindra	Hanura	NasDem	PBB	PKPI	Und.	Lead
2009 election	9 April 2009	104,048,118	20.85%	14.45%	14.03%	7.88%	6.01%	5.32%	4.94%	4.46%	3.77%	–	1.79%	0.90%	15.60%	6.40%
LSI (Lingkaran)	1–8 March 2013	1,200	11.7%	22.2%	18.8%	3.7%	4.0%	4.0%	4.5%	7.3%	2.6%	4.5%	–	–	16.7%	3.4%
LSN	26 February–15 March 2013	1,230	4.3%	19.2%	20.5%	4.6%	4.1%	3.4%	4.1%	11.9%	6.2%	5.3%	0.4%	0.2%	15.8%	1.3%
LKP	20–30 March 2013	1,225	7.8%	19.2%	18.8%	5.1%	4.6%	3.9%	4.4%	10.5%	8.1%	6.3%	0.9%	0.3%	10.1%	0.4%
LSN	1–10 May 2013	1,230	6.1%	19.7%	18.3%	3.8%	3.8%	4.3%	4.6%	13.9%	6.9%	4.8%	1.4%	0.05%	11.9%	1.4%
LIPI	10–31 May 2013	1,799	11.1%	14.5%	14.9%	2.6%	2.5%	2.9%	5.6%	7.4%	1.9%	2.2%	0.6%	0.3%	31.1%	0.4%
IRC	May 2013	-	7.5%	12.2%	14.7%	2.8%	2.8%	2.4%	2.8%	11.1%	4.0%	4.5%	0.4%	0.3%	-	3.6%
PDB	11–18 June 2013	1,200	9.4%	14.1%	14.53%	1.2%	2.56%	2.31%	2.56%	8.89%	1.03%	3.33%	0.34%	0.09%	21.11%	0.43%
IRC	8–11 July 2013	794	7.66%	7.00%	17.96%	3.30%	1.45%	0.9%	1.19%	6.61%	5.95%	2.11%	1.4%	1.5%	44.1%	10.30%
Kompas	July 2013	1,400	10.1%	16.0%	23.6%	2.20%	2.5%	4.2%	5.7%	13.6%	2.7%	4.1%	–	–	13.4%	7.6%
Alvara	15–23 August 2013	1,532	7.4%	8.4%	14.8%	3.4%	2.1%	2.2%	1.7%	12.5%	3.8%	4.6%	0.1%	0.1%	39.0%	2.3%
SSSG	25 August–9 September 2013	1,250	10.3%	5.0%	13.6%	2.9%	2.7%	0.9%	0.6%	5.6%	2.2%	1.9%	0.9%	0.1%	–	3.3%
LSI (Lingkaran)	12 September–5 October 2013	1,200	9.8%	20.4%	18.7%	4.4%	5.2%	4.6%	4.6%	6.6%	3.4%	2.0%	0.6%	0.3%	19.4%	1.7%
Pol-Tracking Institute	13 September–11 October 2013	2,010	8.8%	16.9%	18.5%	2.9%	2.0%	3.4%	4.6%	6.6%	3.5%	2.1%	0.7%	0.1%	-	2.4%
Indikator	10–20 October 2013	1,200 (400)	9.2%	17.5%	21.6%	3.1%	1.2%	4.7%	4.5%	9.1%	4.1%	3.7%	0.9%	0%	20.3%	4.1%
Indikator (if Joko Widodo runs)	10–20 October 2013	1,200 (400)	8.8%	16.9%	37.8%	0.6%	2.5%	3.6%	2.5%	6.6%	3.5%	1.4%	0.3%	0%	21.1%	20.9%
Morgan	October 2013	2,985	15%	21%	24%	5%	5%	2%	7%	12%	5%	2%	1%	–	1%	3%
Morgan	November 2013	2,960	14%	21%	29%	5%	5%	2%	5%	12%	5%	2%	0%	–	–	8%
Charta Politika	28 November–6 December 2013	2,010	7.4%	12.6%	15.8%	3.8%	4.4%	3.8%	5.9%	7.8%	4.1%	3.9%	0.4%	0.3%	29.7%	3.2%
Indo Barometer	4–15 December 2013	1,200	5.4%	14.2%	28.8%	2.5%	4.2%	2.1%	7.1%	9.2%	2.5%	0.8%	0.4%	0.0%	22.9	14.6%
Pol-Tracking Institute	16–23 December 2013	1,200	7.92%	15.93%	22.44%	3.00%	2.67%	4.50%	4.59%	8.67%	4.25%	2.50%	0.25%	0.00%	23.27%	6.49%
Kompas	December 2013	1,380-1,400	7.2%	16.5%	21.8%	2.3%	3.2%	2.4%	5.1%	11.1%	6.6%	6.9%	1.1%	0.1%	6.7%	5.3%
Morgan	December 2013	2,144	14%	20%	26%	4%	5%	2%	6%	12%	6%	3%	1%	–	1%	6%
LSI (Lingkaran)	6–16 January 2014	1,200	4.7%	18.3%	18.2%	2.2%	3.3%	3.6%	3.7%	8.7%	4.0%	2.0%	0.7%	0.5%	30.1%	0.1%
LSJ	12–26 January 2014	1,240	6.12%	17.74%	19.83%	3.87%	4.51%	4.83%	4.67%	12.58%	6.85%	6.94%	1.20%	0.24%	10.62%	2.09%
Morgan	January 2014	3,000	11%	20%	27%	4%	5%	2%	7%	14%	6%	2%	1%	–	1%	7%
Median	28 January–15 February 2014	1,500	5.7%	17.8%	21.4%	5.1%	3.5%	4.9%	5.0%	6.2%	4.8%	3.6%	1.1%	0.1%	20.8%	3.6%
Morgan	February 2014	2,934	10%	20%	29%	4%	4%	2%	6%	15%	7%	2%	1%	–	–	9%
LKP	26 February–4 March 2014	1,240	6.7%	18.1%	21.8%	3.7%	3.3%	3.5%	5.7%	11.1%	11.3%	3.1%	1.1%	0.3%	10.3%	3.7%
Charta Politika	1–8 March 2014	1,200	8.0%	16.4%	21.2%	3.2%	4.5%	5.1%	7.2%	12.0%	4.8%	2.6%	0.4%	0.1%	14.5%	4.8%
Morgan	1–15 March 2014	2,300	11%	22%	27%	4%	4%	3%	3%	17%	6%	2%	1%	–	–	5%
Morgan	16–30 March 2014	1,965	10%	17%	37%	4%	4%	2%	3%	14%	6%	3%	–	–	–	20%
JSI	24–30 March 2014	1,200	9.0%	18.0%	24.7%	4.3%	6.5%	5.4%	7.9%	11.8%	6.1%	4.4%	0.9%	0.9%	–	6.7%
Election results	9 April 2014	124,972,491	10.19%	14.75%	18.95%	6.79%	7.59%	6.53%	9.04%	11.81%	5.26%	6.72%	1.46%	0.91%	–	4.20%

== Results ==
The Indonesian Democratic Party of Struggle won the highest vote share with 18.95% of the votes, followed by Golkar with 14.75% and the Gerindra Party with 11.81%. However, none of the parties were able to nominate their own presidential candidate for the 2014 Indonesian presidential election because none of them reached the 20% electoral threshold.

Party	Votes	%	+/–	Seats	+/–
Indonesian Democratic Party of Struggle	23,681,233	18.95	+4.92	109	+15
Golkar	18,432,216	14.75	+0.30	91	–15
Gerindra Party	14,760,090	11.81	+7.35	73	+47
Democratic Party	12,728,950	10.18	–10.66	61	–87
National Awakening Party	11,299,017	9.04	+4.10	47	+19
National Mandate Party	9,481,395	7.59	+1.58	49	+3
Prosperous Justice Party	8,480,158	6.79	–1.09	40	–17
NasDem Party	8,402,894	6.72	New	35	New
United Development Party	8,157,522	6.53	+1.21	39	+1
People's Conscience Party	6,590,804	5.27	+1.49	16	–1
Crescent Star Party	1,826,057	1.46	–0.33	0	0
Indonesian Justice and Unity Party	1,143,138	0.91	+0.01	0	0
Total	124,983,474	100.00	–	560	0
Valid votes	124,983,474	89.26			
Invalid/blank votes	15,033,341	10.74			
Total votes	140,016,815	100.00			
Registered voters/turnout	187,866,698	74.53			
Source: KPU Buku Data & Infografik Pemilu Anggota DPR RI & DPD RI 2014 pp27,31-32

=== By province ===
Province	Total seats	Seats won									
Province	Total seats	PDI-P	Golkar	Gerindra	Demokrat	PAN	PKB	PKS	PPP	Nasdem	Hanura
Aceh	13	1	2	2	2	1	1	1	1	2	0
North Sumatra	30	4	4	4	3	3	1	3	2	3	3
West Sumatra	14	2	2	2	2	1	0	2	2	1	0
Riau	11	2	2	2	2	1	1	1	0	0	0
Jambi	7	1	1	1	1	1	1	0	1	0	0
South Sumatra	17	3	3	2	2	2	1	2	0	1	1
Bengkulu	4	1	0	1	0	1	0	0	0	1	0
Lampung	18	4	2	2	2	2	2	2	0	1	1
Bangka Belitung Islands	3	1	1	0	1	0	0	0	0	0	0
Riau Islands	3	1	0	0	0	1	0	0	0	1	0
Jakarta	21	6	3	3	2	0	0	3	3	1	0
West Java	91	18	17	10	9	7	7	11	7	1	4
Central Java	77	18	11	10	4	8	10	4	7	5	0
Yogyakarta	8	2	1	1	1	1	1	1	0	0	0
East Java	87	17	11	11	11	7	15	2	4	7	2
Banten	22	4	3	3	2	2	1	2	3	1	1
Bali	9	4	2	1	2	0	0	0	0	0	0
West Nusa Tenggara	10	1	1	1	1	1	1	1	1	1	1
East Nusa Tenggara	13	2	3	2	2	1	0	0	0	2	1
West Kalimantan	10	3	1	1	1	1	1	0	1	1	0
Central Kalimantan	6	2	1	1	0	1		0	0	1	0
South Kalimantan	11	1	3	2	0	0	2	1	2	0	0
East Kalimantan	8	1	2	1	1	0	0	1	1	1	0
North Sulawesi	6	2	1	1	1	1	0	0	0	0	0
Central Sulawesi	6	1	1	1	1	0	0	0	0	1	1
South Sulawesi	24	2	5	3	3	3	0	2	3	2	1
Southeast Sulawesi	5	0	1	1	1	1	0	0	1	0	0
Gorontalo	3	0	2	1	0	0	0	0	0	0	0
West Sulawesi	3	0	1	1	1	0	0	0	0	0	0
Maluku	4	1	1	1	0	0	1	0	0	0	0
North Maluku	3	1	1	0	0	1	0	0	0	0	0
Papua	10	2	1	1	2	1	1	1	0	1	0
West Papua	3	1	1	0	1	0	0	0	0	0	0
Total	560	109	91	73	61	49	47	40	39	35	16
Source: Kompas.com

== Gallery ==
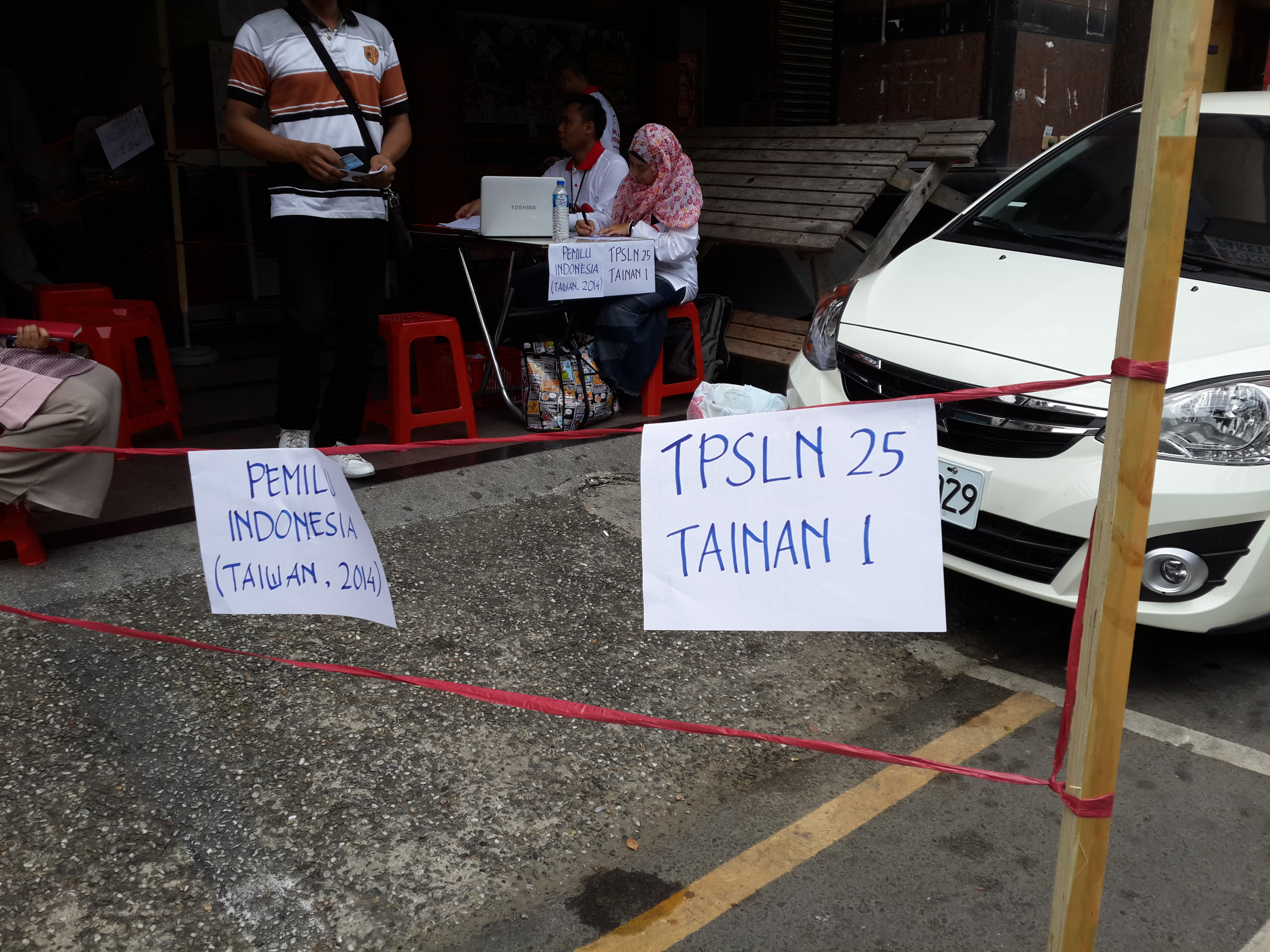
Polling station for overseas Indonesians in Tainan, Taiwan

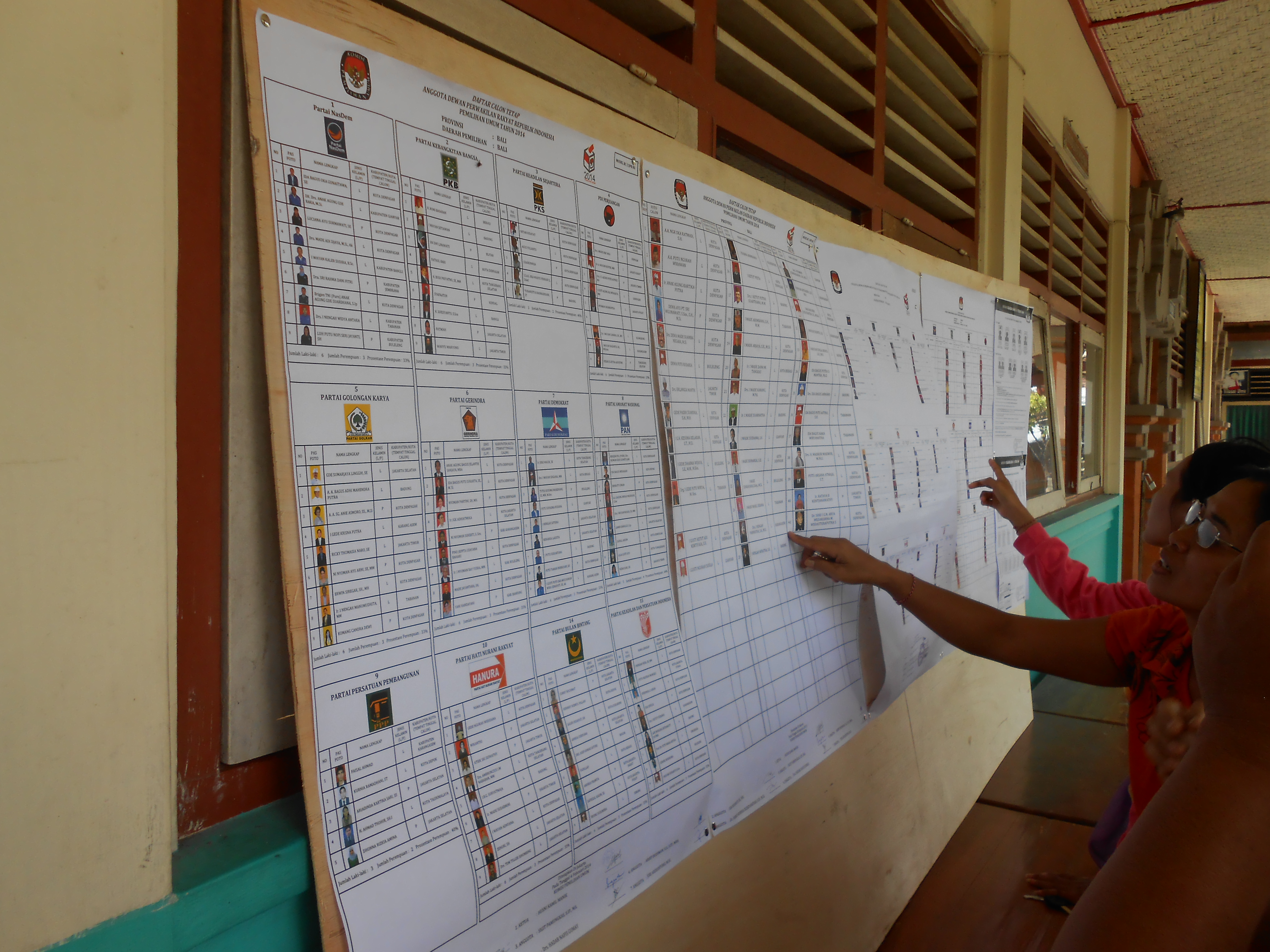
Voters examining the list of legislative candidates

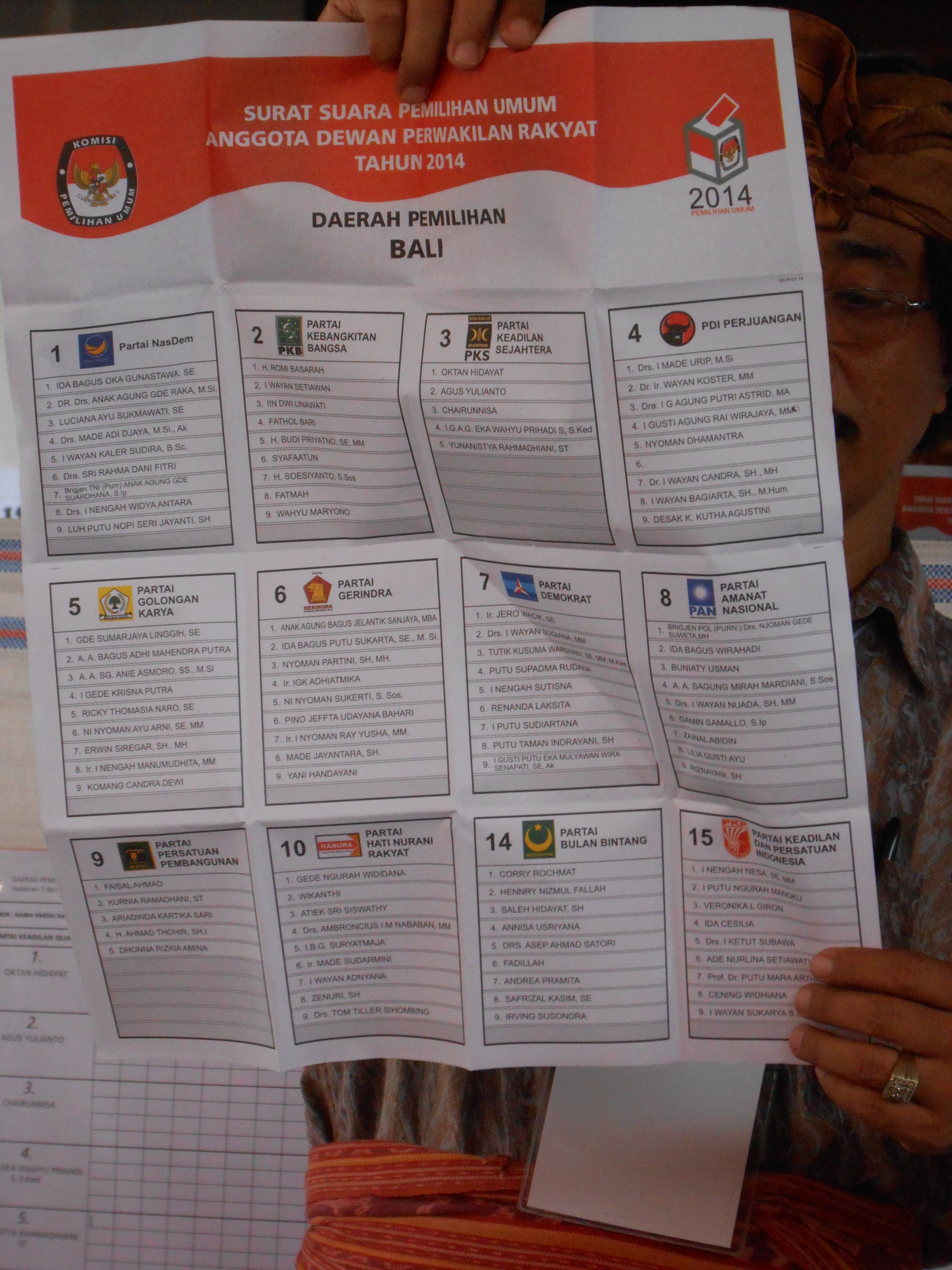
An election official holding up a ballot paper during the vote count

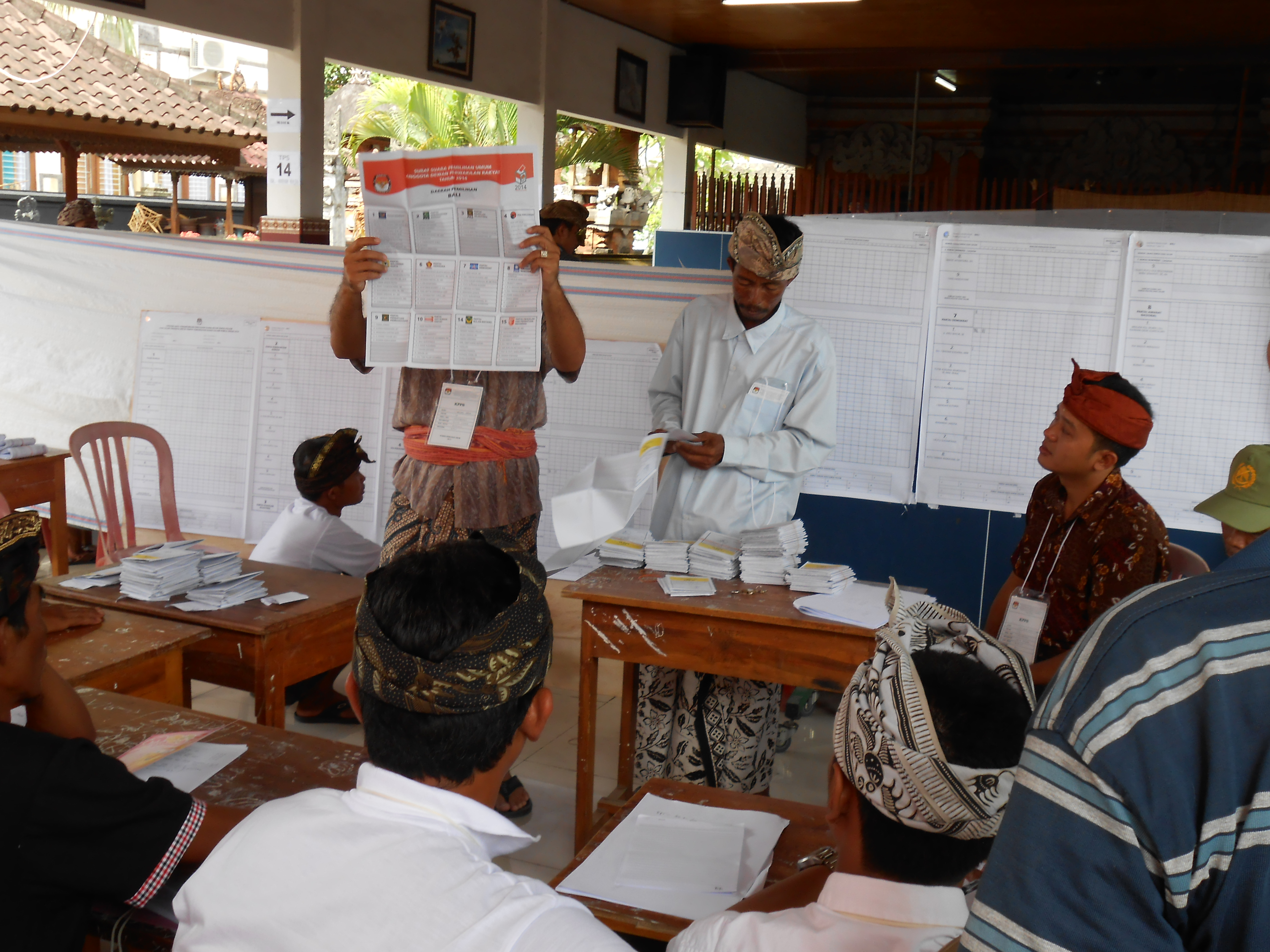
Counting underway in a polling station in Bali
