= Bartholomeus van Bassen =

Dutch Golden Age painter and architect

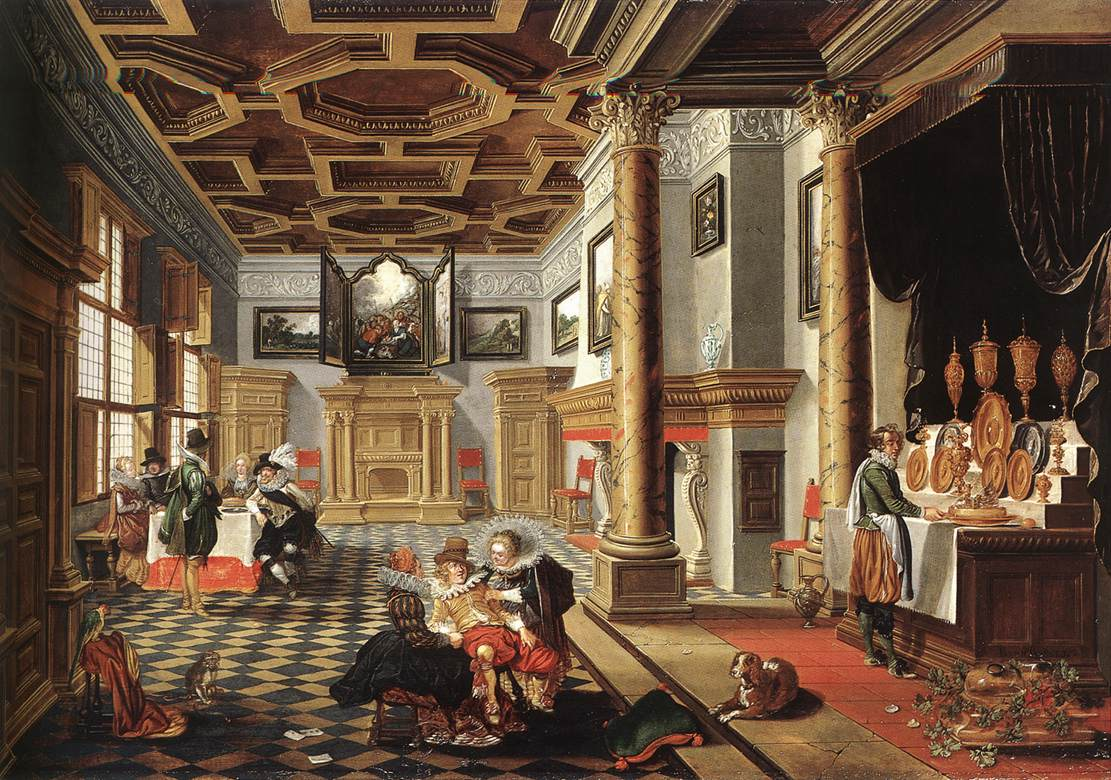
Renaissance interior, 1618–1620

Bartholomeus Corneliszoon van Bassen (1590–1652) was a Dutch Golden Age painter and architect.

== Biography ==
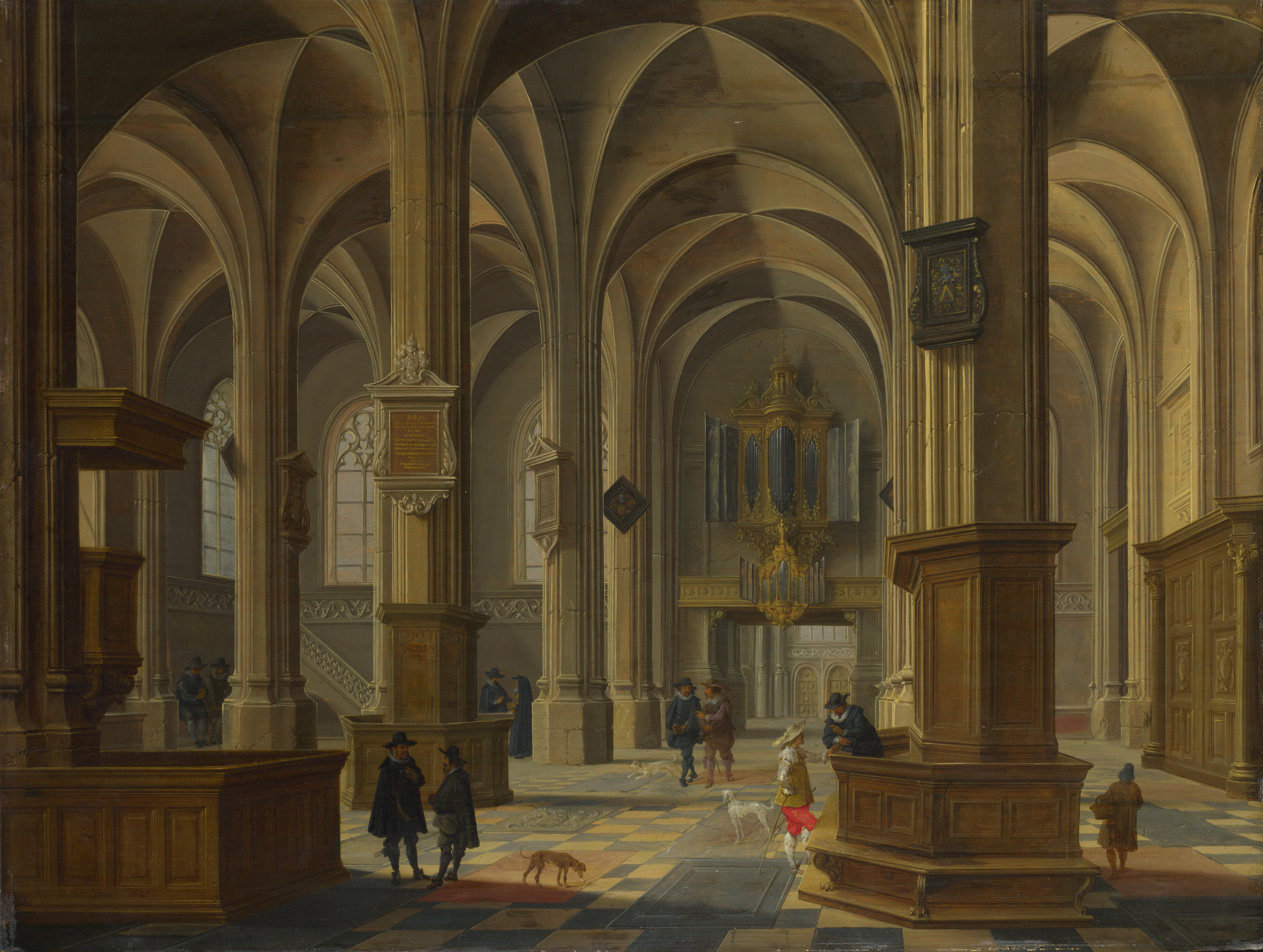
Interior of the Cunerakerk Rhenen

Van Bassen was the illegitimate son of Cornelis van Bassen and the grandson of Bartholt Ernst van Bassen, who both lived and died in The Hague. Little is known of his early life, but according to the Netherlands Institute for Art History he became a member of the Delft Guild of St. Luke in 1613. In 1622 he moved to The Hague, where he became a member of The Hague Guild of St. Luke two years later and where he became dean in 1627 and headman in 1636 and 1640. He is known for his architectural works, sometimes with staffage by the painters Anthonie Palamedesz., Esaias van de Velde, and Jan Martszen de Jonge.

In 1638 he became city architect of the Hague. He worked on the summer palace Huis Honselaarsdijk for Frederick Henry, Prince of Orange (torn down after being used as a military hospital during the War of 1812), the restoration of the City Hall, and from 1649 onwards he was involved with building the Nieuwe Kerk.

Van Bassen was also involved in a number of nationwide architectural projects. His most important building was "Het Koningshuis", the summer palace of Frederick V, Elector Palatine. Called "King of Bohemia" for one winter, he is remembered in the Netherlands as the "Winterkoning" for this reason. His summer palace was in the town of Rhenen, near Utrecht, and it was built to Bassen's design in 1629–1631. This palace, like Honselaarsdijk, was also used as a military hospital during the War of 1812 and was torn down soon after.

He kept a workshop and took on pupils, most notably Gerard Houckgeest and Jan van der Vucht. He died in The Hague.

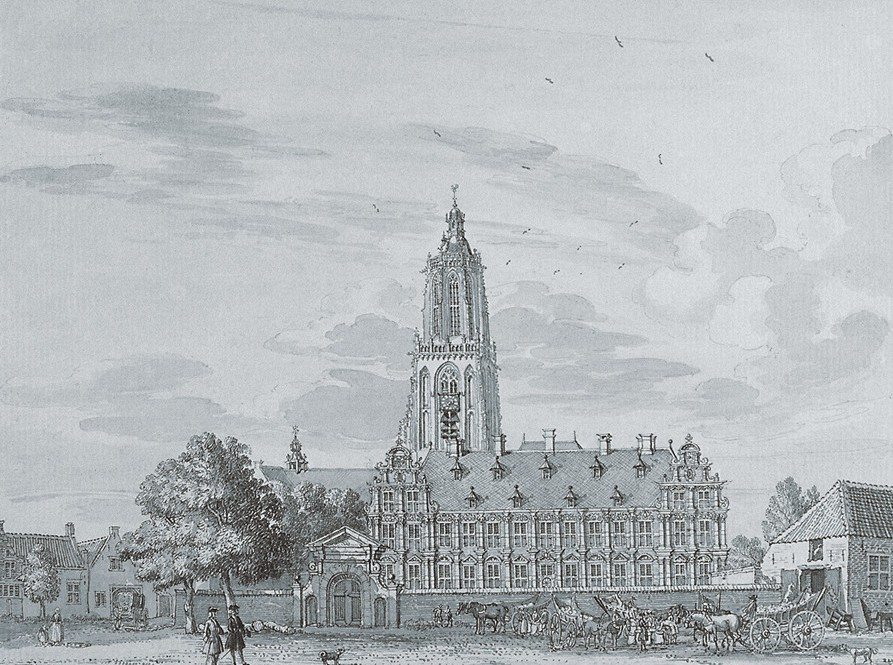
Summer palace of Frederick V in Rhenen, shown with the Cunera tower behind it, by Jan de Beijer, 1745

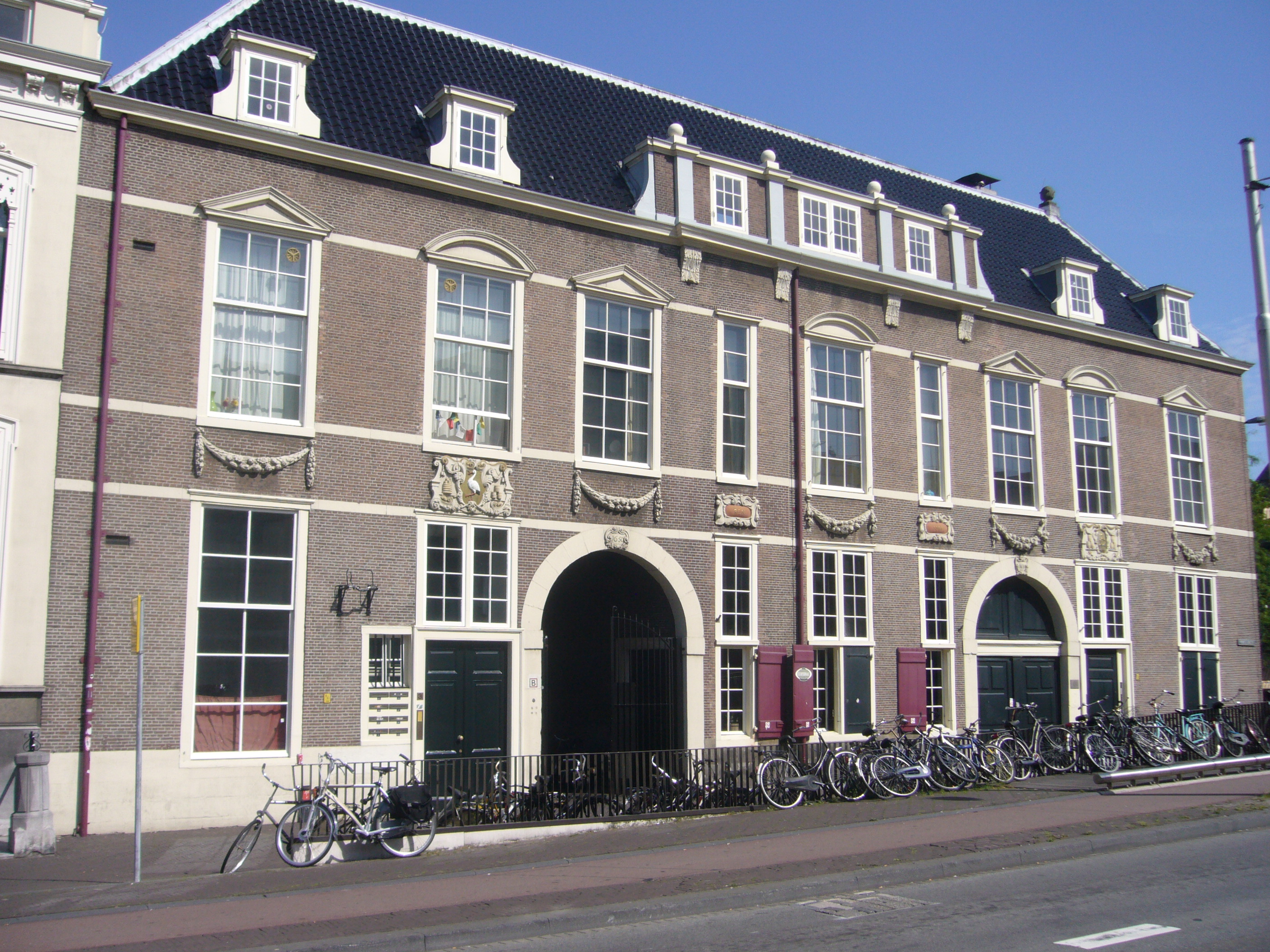
The Boterwaag, a weigh house for butter that he designed, built on the Prinsegracht canal he designed.

== See also ==
- List of Dutch architects

== Bibliography ==
- Hans Jantzen, Das Niederländische Architekturbild, Braunschweig, Klinkhardt & Biermann, 1910
- Bernard G. Maillet, La Peinture Architecturale des Ecoles du Nord : les Intérieurs d'Eglises 1580-1720, Pandora Publishers Wijnegem, 2012, ISBN 9789052353371
