= Nienhuys =

Nienhuys is a Dutch surname. Notable people with the surname include:

- Jacob Nienhuys (1836–1937), founder of tobacco producer Deli Company
- Jan Willem Nienhuys (born 1942), mathematician, book translator, and skeptic
