= Koningshuis =

Royal palace in Rhenen, the Netherlands

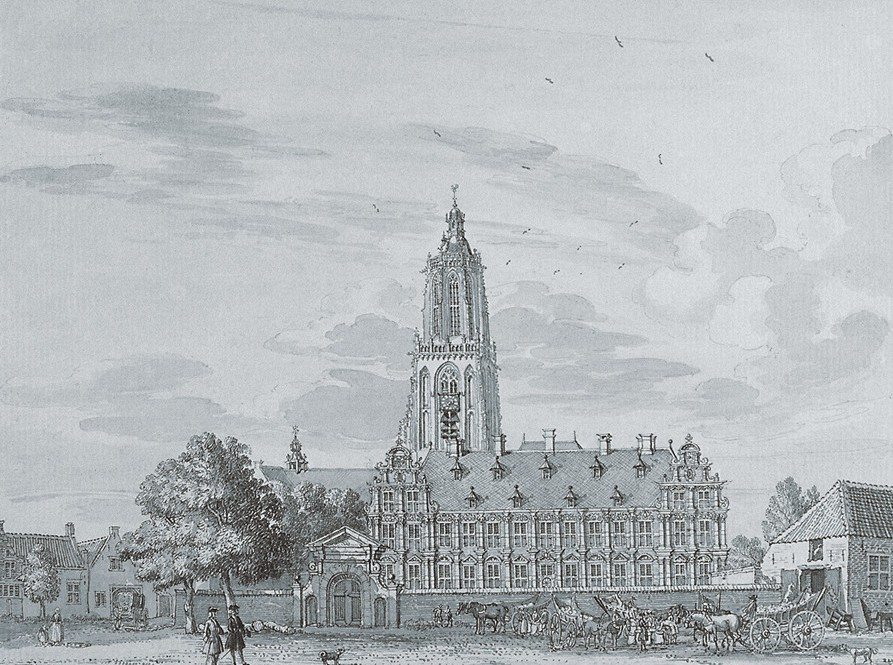
The Koningshuis at Rhenen by Jan de Beijer

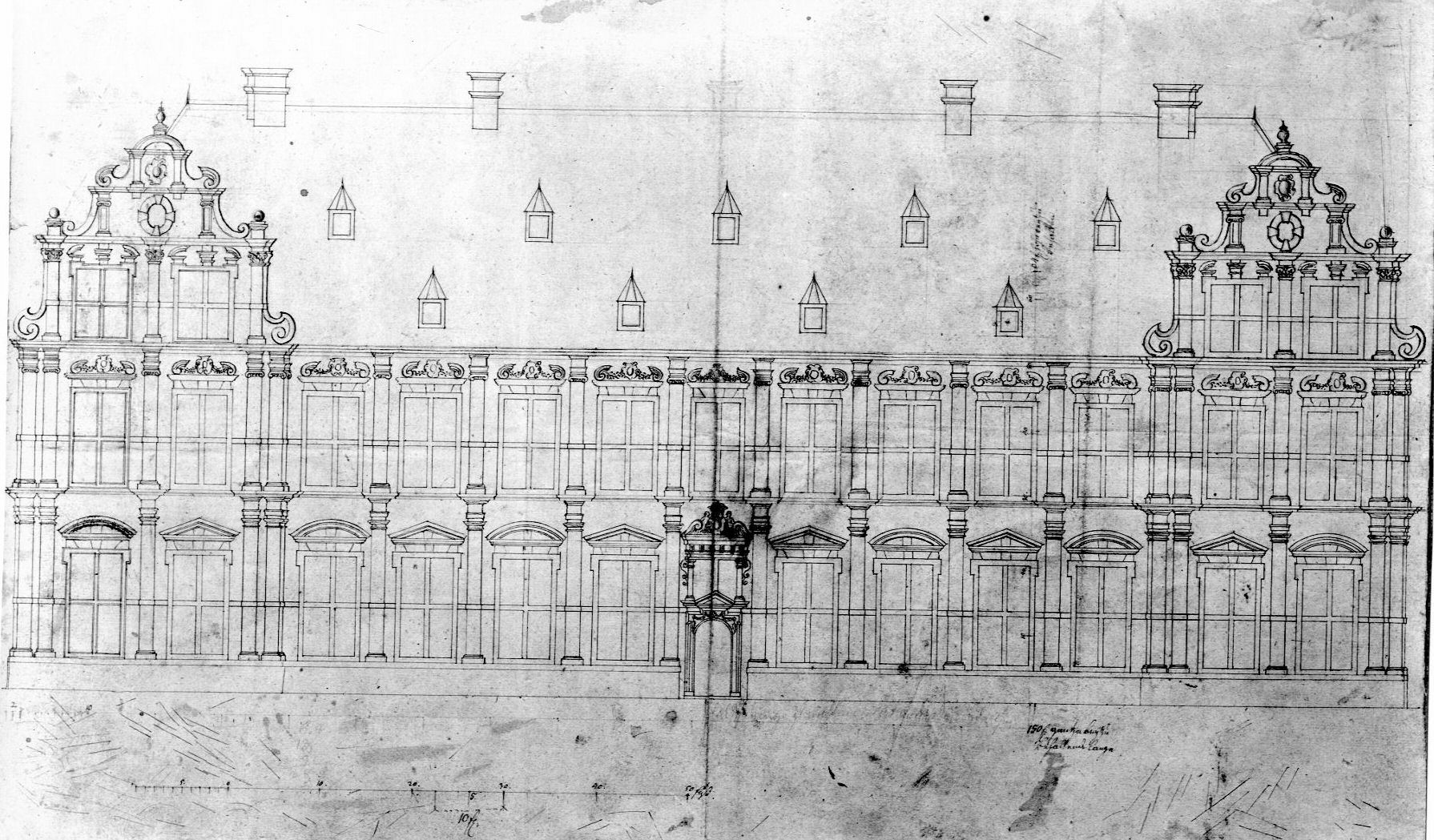
The front facade of the Koningshuis

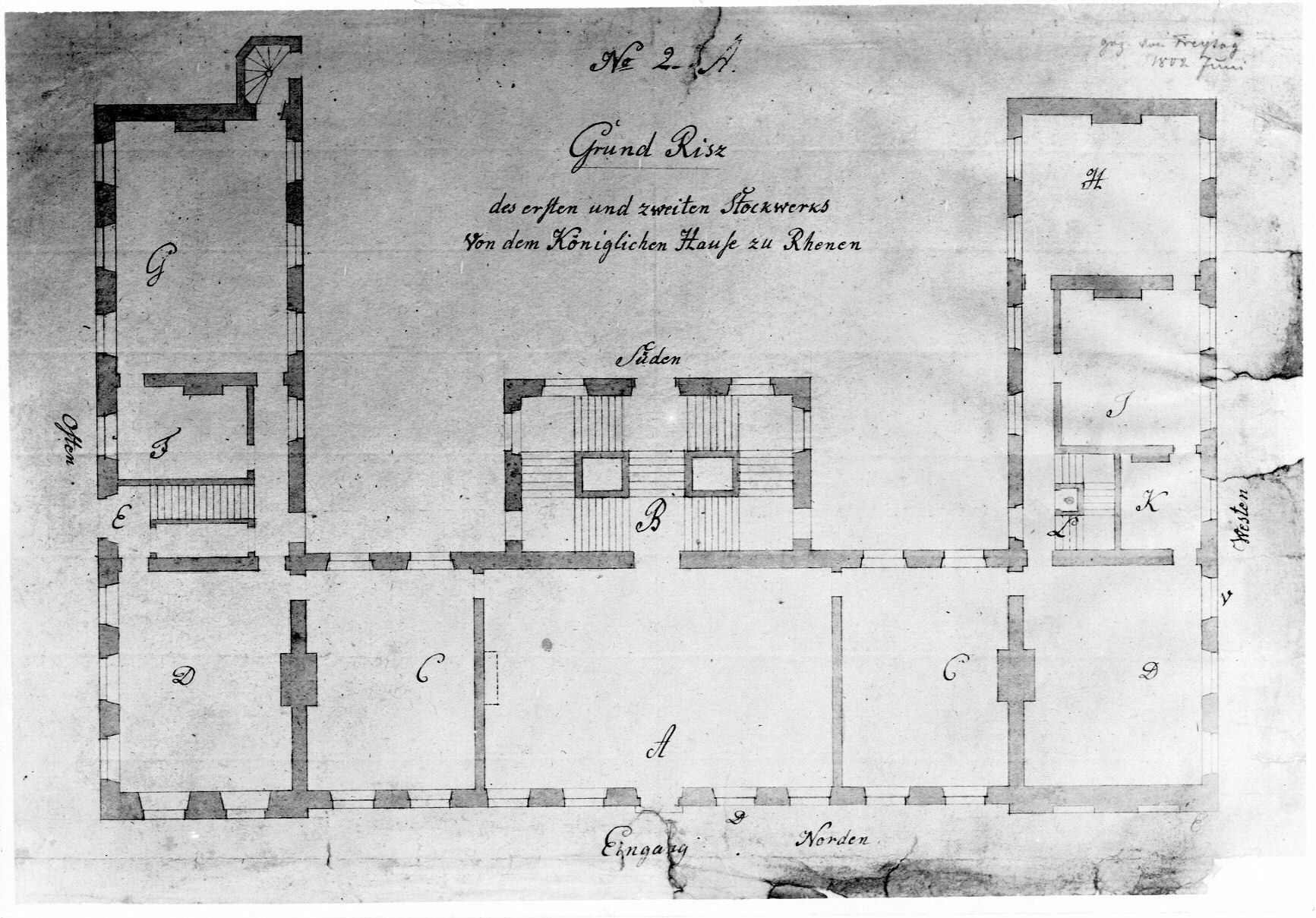
Plan of the first floor of the Koningshuis

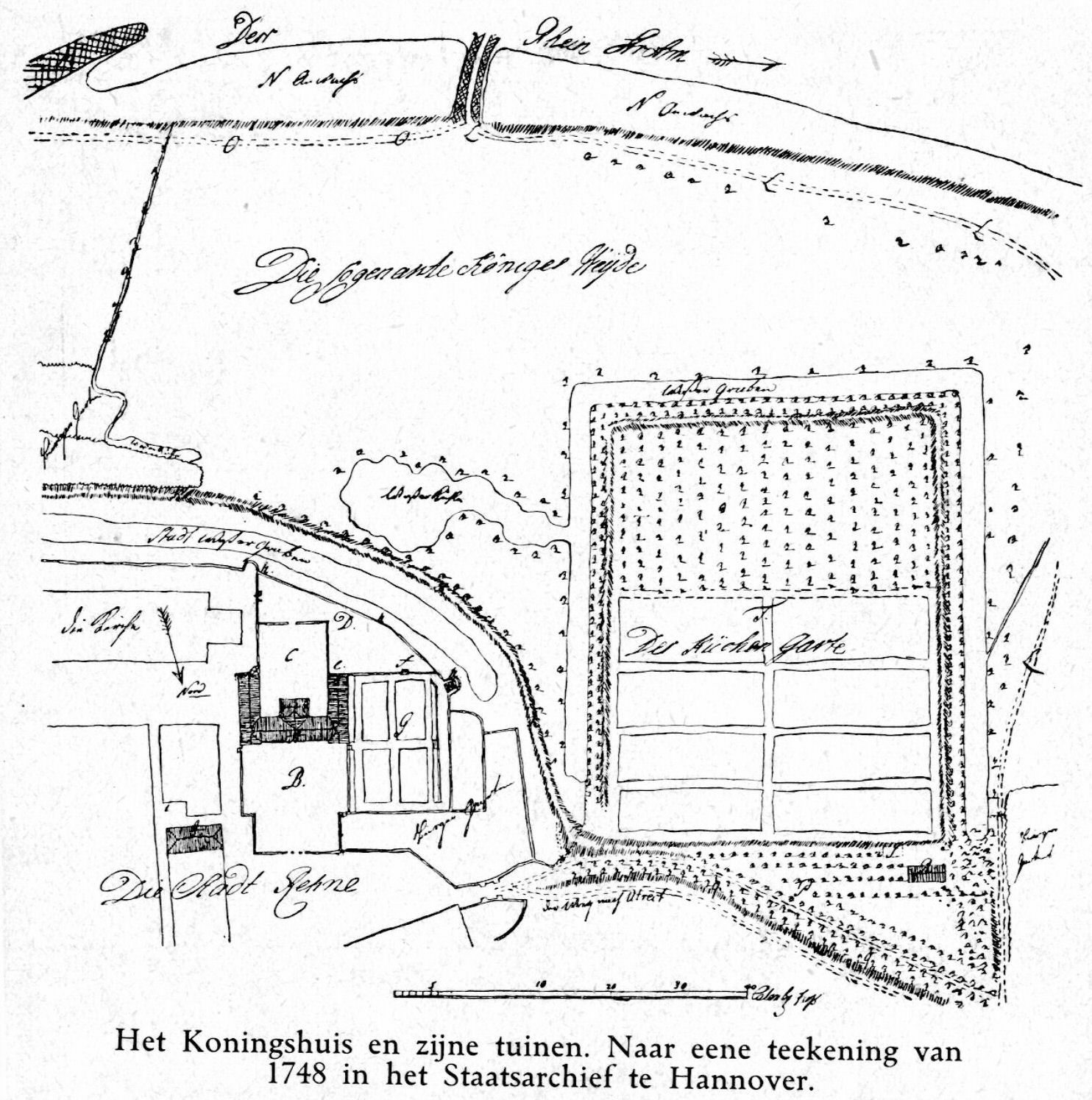
Plan of the Koningshuis and its surrounding gardens

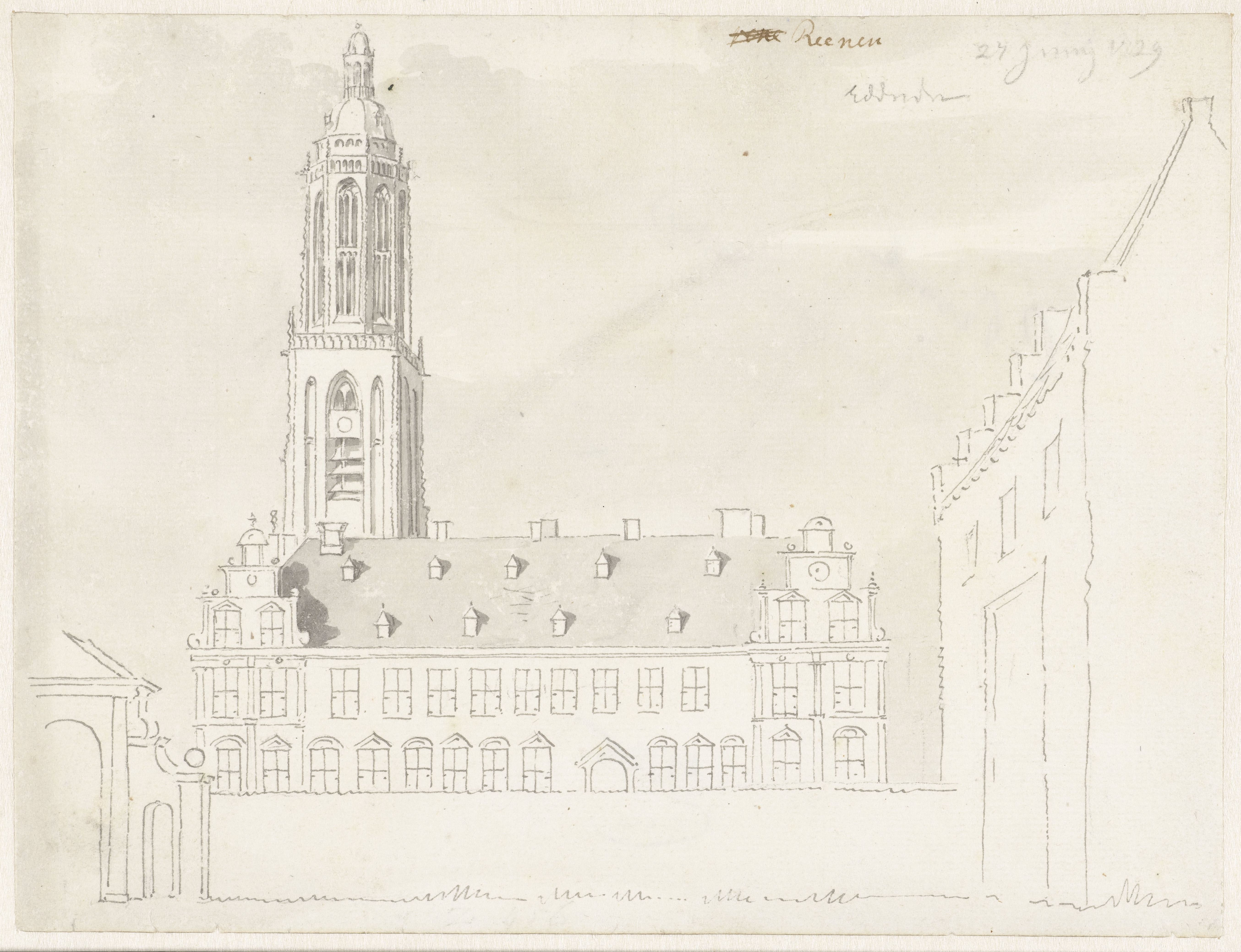
The Koningshuis with the Cunera church in the back

The Koningshuis (Dutch: Kings Home) was a royal palace in Rhenen, the Netherlands. It was the summer residence of the "winter king" Frederick V of the Palatinate. It was demolished in 1812.

== History ==
Frederick V (1596–1632) was the Elector Palatine of the Rhine in the Holy Roman Empire from 1610 to 1623, and reigned as King of Bohemia from 1619 to 1620. He was forced to abdicate both roles, and the brevity of his reign in Bohemia earned him the derisive sobriquet the Winter King. He went to exile in the Netherlands.

During his time in exile, he primarily lived in The Hague. He spent vast sums of money on building and entertainment to maintain the dignity of a royal court, quickly blowing through donations from the English and Dutch governments. The summers were spent in Rhenen, passing the time with hunting long walks.

In 1629, Frederick V acquired a former monastery on the west side of the city, next to the Cunera Church. The building was quickly demolished, and he commissioned Bartholomeus van Bassen to design a new palace, which was constructed between 1630 and 1631. The palace was a two-storey main building, thirteen windows wide (approximately 40 metres), with two wings projecting to the south. It was surrounded by large gardens.

Frederick V could only enjoy the palace for one year, as he died in 1632. The palace was then used by his widow, Elizabeth Stuart, Queen of Bohemia (1596–1662). After the restoration in England, she returned to England and the palace was left empty.

The palace was inherited by the Electors of Hanover, who rented it out. In 1794, it served as a military hospital for British soldiers. The building fell into serious disrepair and was sold for demolition in 1812. In various places in Rhenen, one can find remains of the palace ornaments.

Although, there are only small ornaments remaining, there are various engravings and plans showing how the palace looked like.

== Literature ==
- Overvoorde, J.C. (1902). "Het slot van den Winterkoning te Rhenen". Bulletin van den Nederlandschen Oudheidkundigen Bond (in Dutch). Koninklijke Nederlandsche Oudheidkundige Bond: 75–79.
- Deys, H.P. (1997). "Frederik V van de Palts en zijn bezittingen in Rhenen" (PDF). Oud Rhenen: tijdschrift voor de historie van Rhenen (in Dutch). Historische Vereniging Oudheidkamer Rhenen en Omstreken.
- Van Groningen, Catherina (1999). De Utrechtse Heuvelrug De Stichtse Lustwarande Buitens in het groen (in Dutch). Zwolle/ Den Haag: Uitgeverij Waanders/ Rijksdienst voor de Monumentenzorg. pp. 84–85. ISBN 90-400-9407-1.
