= Jacob Nienhuys =

Dutch director (1836-1927)

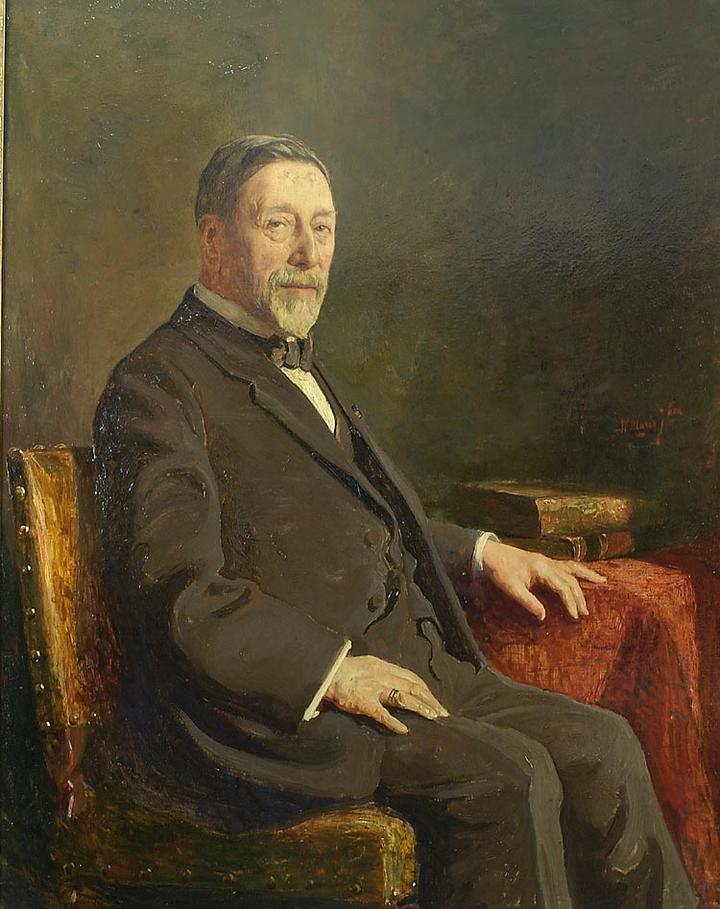
Painting by Willem Maris (1872–1929) of Jacob Nienhuys

Jacob Nienhuys (July 15, 1836, in Rhenen – July 27, 1927, in Bloemendaal) was the founder of tobacco producer Deli Company (Deli Maatschappij) on a plantation established on a land concession from the Sultanate of Deli in Sumatra during the era of the Dutch East Indies. He returned to the Netherlands after he was indicted over the death of 7 plantation workers. Jacob Theodoor Cremer took over administration of the company and Nienhuys maintained a role at the company becoming a very wealthy man as the company grew and its stock price increased.

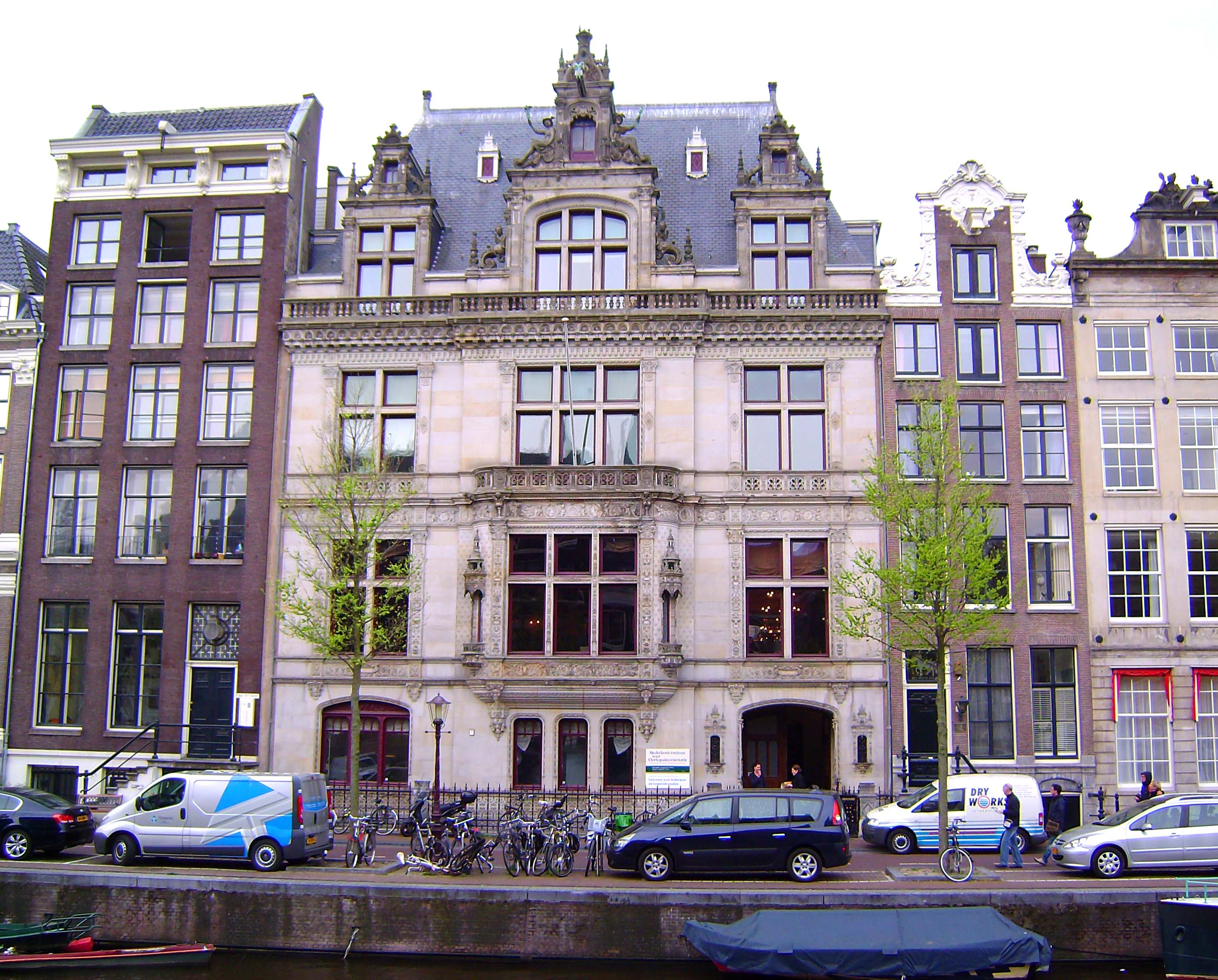
Herengracht 380, built by Jacob Nienhaus in 1890

Nienhuys commissioned the Amsterdam city castle Herengracht 380-382 by the architect Abraham Salm, with virtually every room in a different style. The NIOD Institute for War, Holocaust and Genocide Studies now uses the building. He helped fund the Society for Folk Houses in Amsterdam. He was also involved in property development projects including the Villa Medan built in 1884 and named for the emerging city in Sumatra where the company established its headquarters. This was named after the city Medan on Sumatra.
