= Rhenen =

- City and Municipality
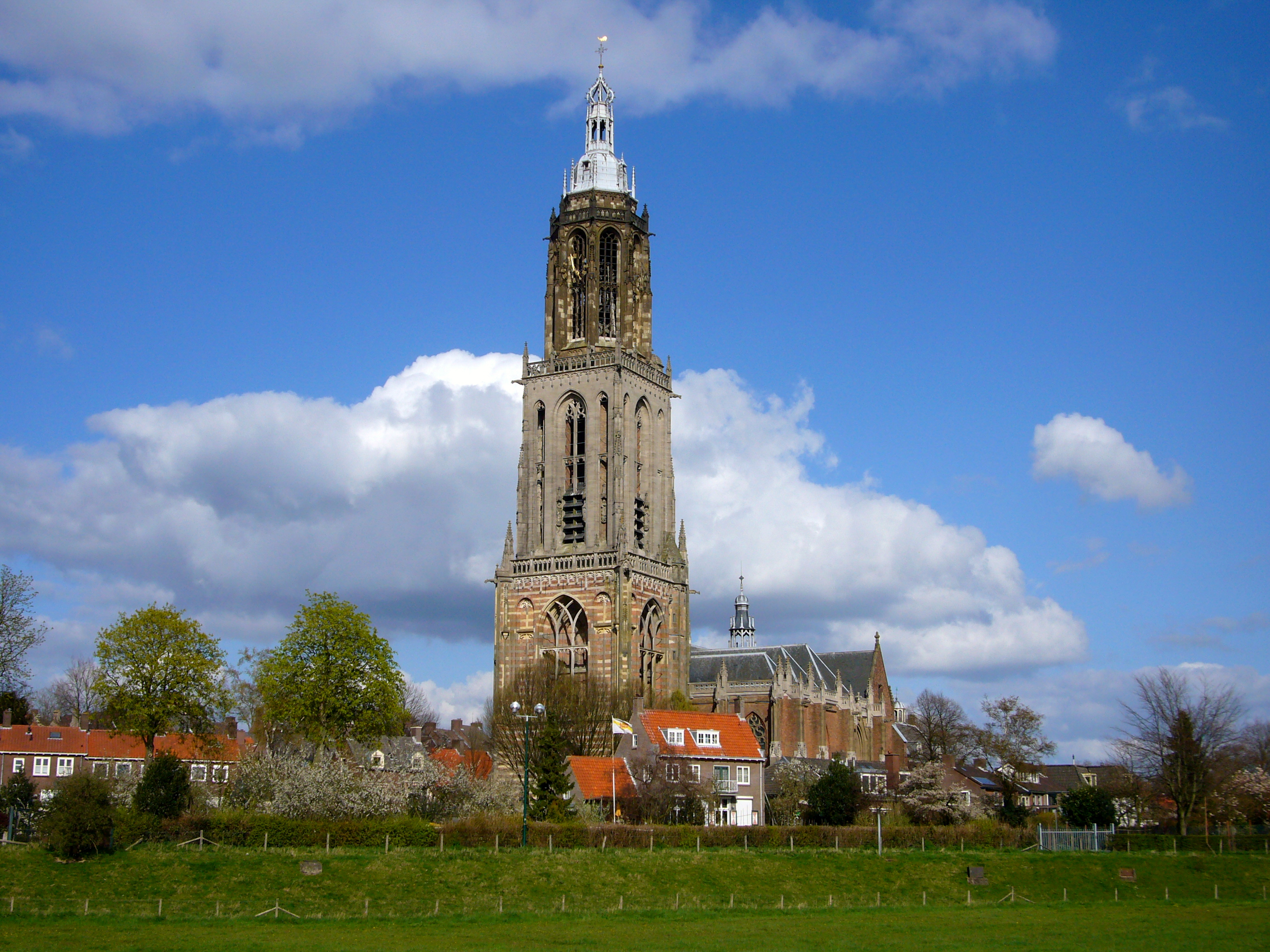
- The Cunera Church in Rhenen

- Flag Coat of arms

- Location in Utrecht
- Coordinates: 51°58′N 5°34′E
- Country: Netherlands
- Province: Utrecht

Government
  - Body: Municipal council
  - Mayor: Géran Kaai, mayor (PvdA)

Area
  - Municipality: 43.76 km^{2} (16.90 sq mi)
  - Land: 42.08 km^{2} (16.25 sq mi)
  - Water: 1.68 km^{2} (0.65 sq mi)
- Elevation: 43 m (141 ft)

Population (January 2021)
  - Municipality: 20,203
  - Density: 480/km^{2} (1,200/sq mi)
- Demonym: Rhenenaar
- Time zone: UTC+1 (CET)
  - Summer (DST): UTC+2 (CEST)
- Postcode: 3910–3922
- Area code: 0317, 0318
- Website: www.rhenen.nl

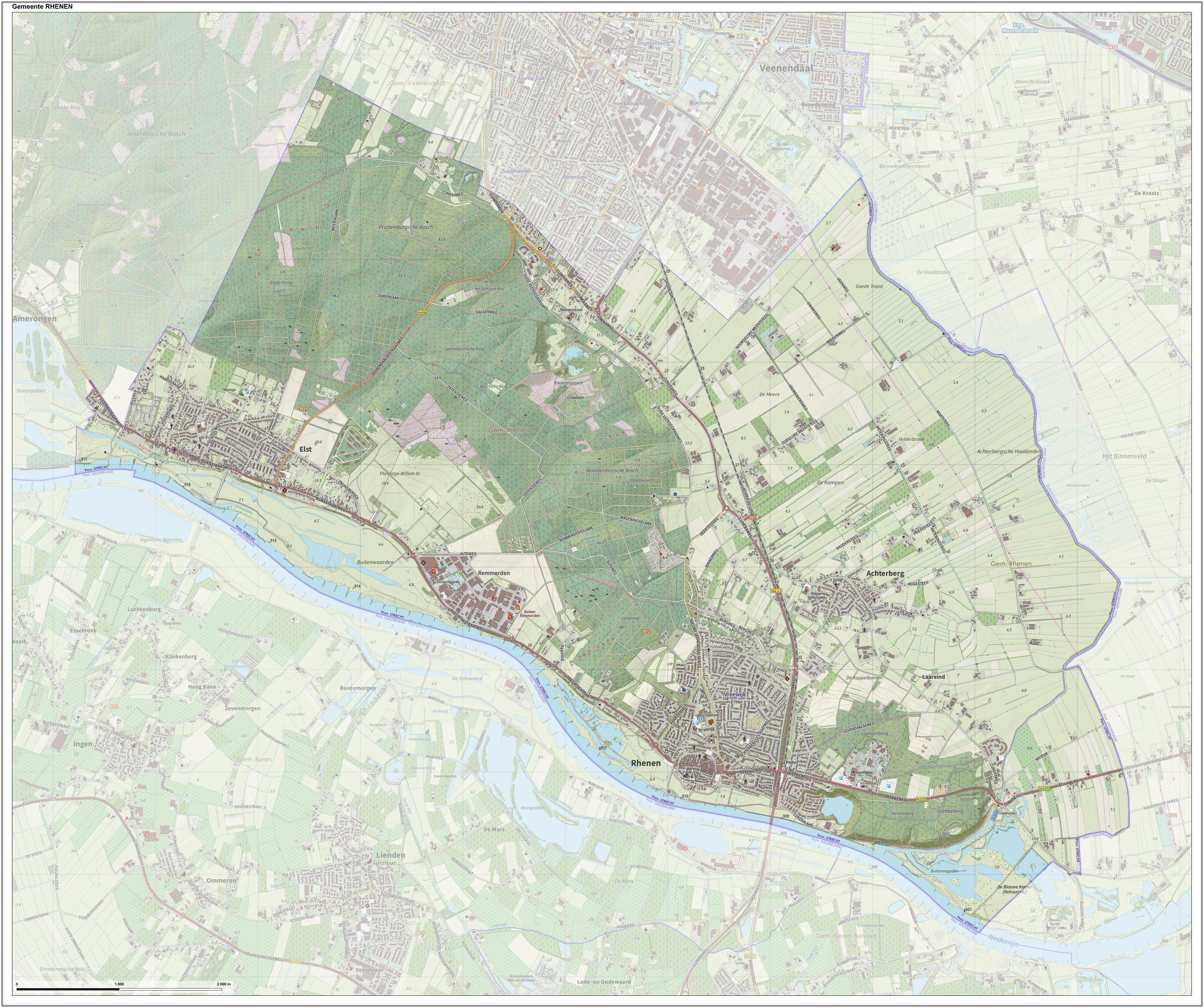
Dutch Topographic map of Rhenen, June 2015

Rhenen (Dutch pronunciation: [ˈreːnə(n)]) is a municipality and a city in the central Netherlands. The municipality also includes the villages of Achterberg, Remmerden and Elst. The town lies on the southernmost part of the chain of hills known as the Utrecht Hill Ridge (Utrechtse Heuvelrug), where this meets the river Rhine. Because of this Rhenen has significant elevation changes across the town.

Directly to the east of the built-up area lies the Grebbeberg, a hill with a height of about 50 metres (160 ft).

== History ==
=== Before 1900 ===
Rhenen received city rights probably between 1256 and 1258. In 1346, the bishop of Utrecht ordered the construction of a defensive wall around the city, which was important because it lay near the border with Guelders. Although for some time the town collected toll from ships on the Rhine, it has never had a harbour. The three city gates were demolished in 1840. Small fragments of the wall remain.

The town is also famous for the Cunera Church, parts of which date back to the 15th century. Containing the relics of Saint Cunera, it attracted many pilgrims. Legend has it that Cunera was buried on a nearby hill now called the Cuneraheuvel. The church's tower was built between 1492 and 1531.

Between 1630 and 1631, the Koningshuis palace was constructed at Rhenen for the ousted Frederick V. It was demolished in 1812.

=== World War II ===
Part of the center of Rhenen, which was located near the defensive Grebbelinie (Grebbe line), was destroyed during the German attack on the Netherlands in May 1940. Part of the reconstruction took place during the war. In 1945, the town was damaged again during the liberation of the country from German occupation.

Many or all of the Dutch soldiers who were killed by the Germans near Rhenen lie buried at the Erebegraafplaats (Cemetery of Honor), located along the Grebbeweg (N 225) near the top of the Grebbeberg. Across the road is an important war monument with a poem by J.C. Bloem.

In 2008 Rhenen celebrated its 750th anniversary.

== Main sights ==
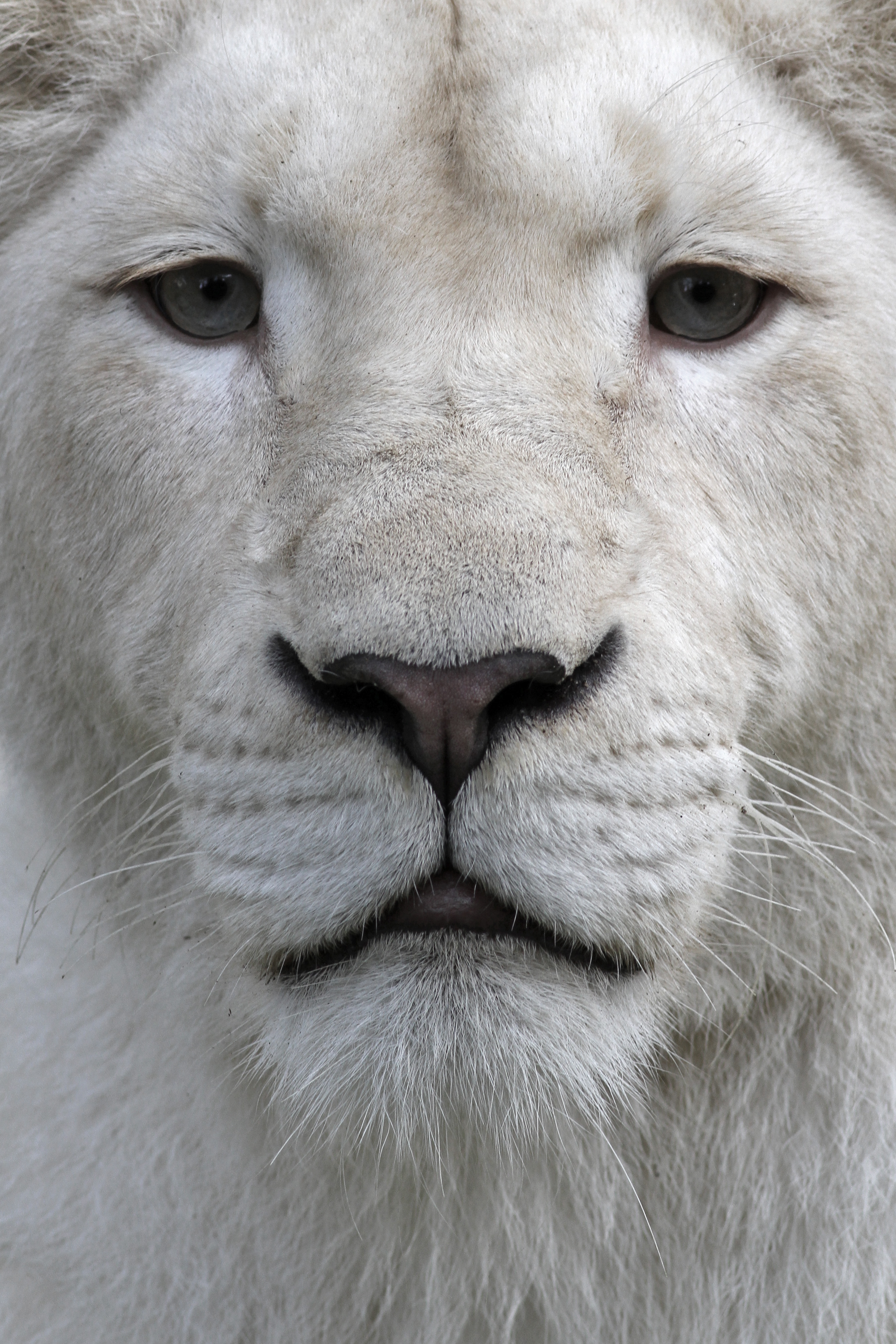
A white lion at Ouwehands Dierenpark

- Ouwehands Dierenpark, a zoo, founded in 1932.
- The Cunerakerk (Cunera Church), a late-Gothic hall-church, built between 1492 and 1531.
- Modern Roman Catholic church Gedachteniskerk, Rhenen, built between 1958 and 1959.
- Building 'De Brakke' from 1787.
- Ruins of the 14th century medieval defensive wall.
- The Binnenmolen, Rhenen, a round gristmill from 1893.
- The Prattenburg estate.
- Military War Cemetery Grebbeberg, a military cemetery on the Grebbeberg.

== Transport ==
- Rhenen railway station

== Politics and administration ==
=== Municipal council ===
The municipal council of Rhenen consists of 19 members since March 2022

Municipal Council seats
Party	1994	1998	2002	2006	2010	2014	2018	2022	2026
SGP	3	3	4	3	3	4	3	5	4
VVD	4	3	3	3	3	2	3	3	2
Rhenens Belang	-	-	-	1	2	2	2	3	2
Progr. Rhenen/ Groenlinks^{1}	1	2	2	4	3	3	3	3	
D66	2	1	1	-	-	1	2	2	2
ChristenUnie^{2}	-	1	-	-	1	2	2	1	1
CDA	4	4	4	3	3	2	1	1	1
PvdA	3	3	3	3	2	1	1	1	
De Lokale Volkspartij	-	-	-	-	-	-	-	-	4
GroenLinks–PvdA/Progr. Rhenen	-	-	-	-	-	-	-	-	3
Total	17	17	17	17	17	17	17	19	19

¹ In the elections up to and including 2002, only GroenLinks participated.

² In 1998, the RPF, one of the predecessors of the Christian Union, participated in the elections.

=== Municipal executive ===
The municipal executive of Rhenen for the council term of 2026–2030 consists of:

- Géran Kaai, Mayor of Rhenen
- Gert van Laar (SGP), Alderman for the physical domain
- Leo Schenk (VVD), Alderman for finance, operations, economy, recreation, and tourism.
- Caroline Folmer (D66), Alderman for the social domain
- Bert Fintelman (CDA), Alderman for rural/agricultural areas, waste management and circularity

Hans van der Pas (PvdA) left his position as mayor 7 March 2024

== Notable people ==
- Frederick V (1596–1632), Count Palatine and Elector of the Palatinate from 1610 to 1623 and King of Bohemia (as Frederick I) from 1619 to 1620
- Giedo van der Garde (born 1985), a Dutch racing driver
- Madelein Meppelink (born 1989), a Dutch beach volleyball player, competed in the 2012 and 2016 Summer Olympics
- Jacob Nienhuys (1836–1927), founded the tobacco producer Deli Company in Sumatra
- Remy Reynierse (born 1961), a former football player with 312 club caps; current coach at Sheffield Wednesday F.C.
- Bibiane Schoofs (born 1988), a Dutch professional tennis player
- Jacobus Tollius (1633–1696), a Dutch classicist
- Eelco Uri (born 1973), a Dutch former water polo player, competed in the 1996 and 2000 Summer Olympics
- Lisa van Viegen (born 1978), stage name iET, a Dutch singer-songwriter and multi-instrumentalist
- Nico Drost (born 1980), a Dutch Member of Parliament

== Gallery ==
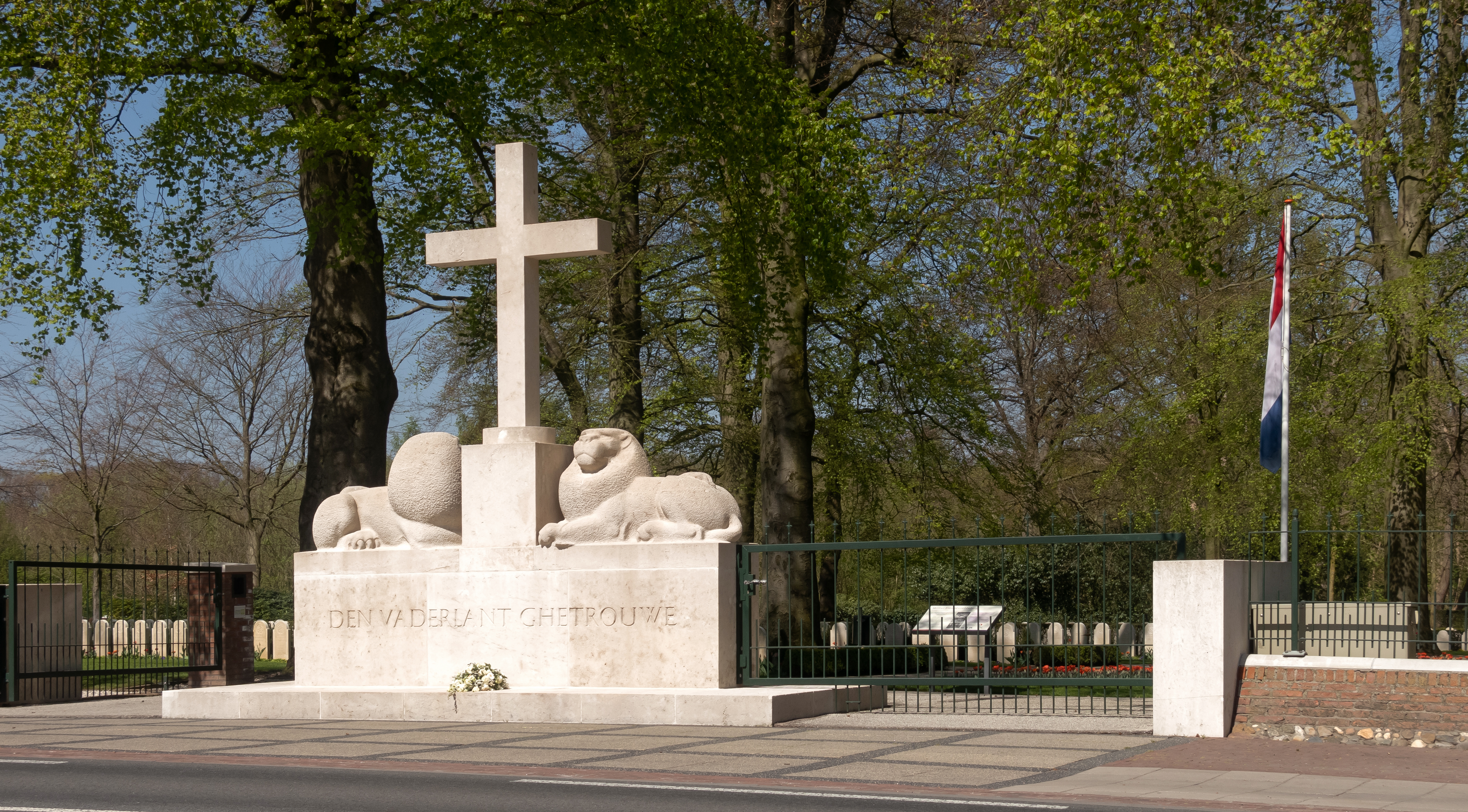
War monument: Militair Ereveld Grebbeberg

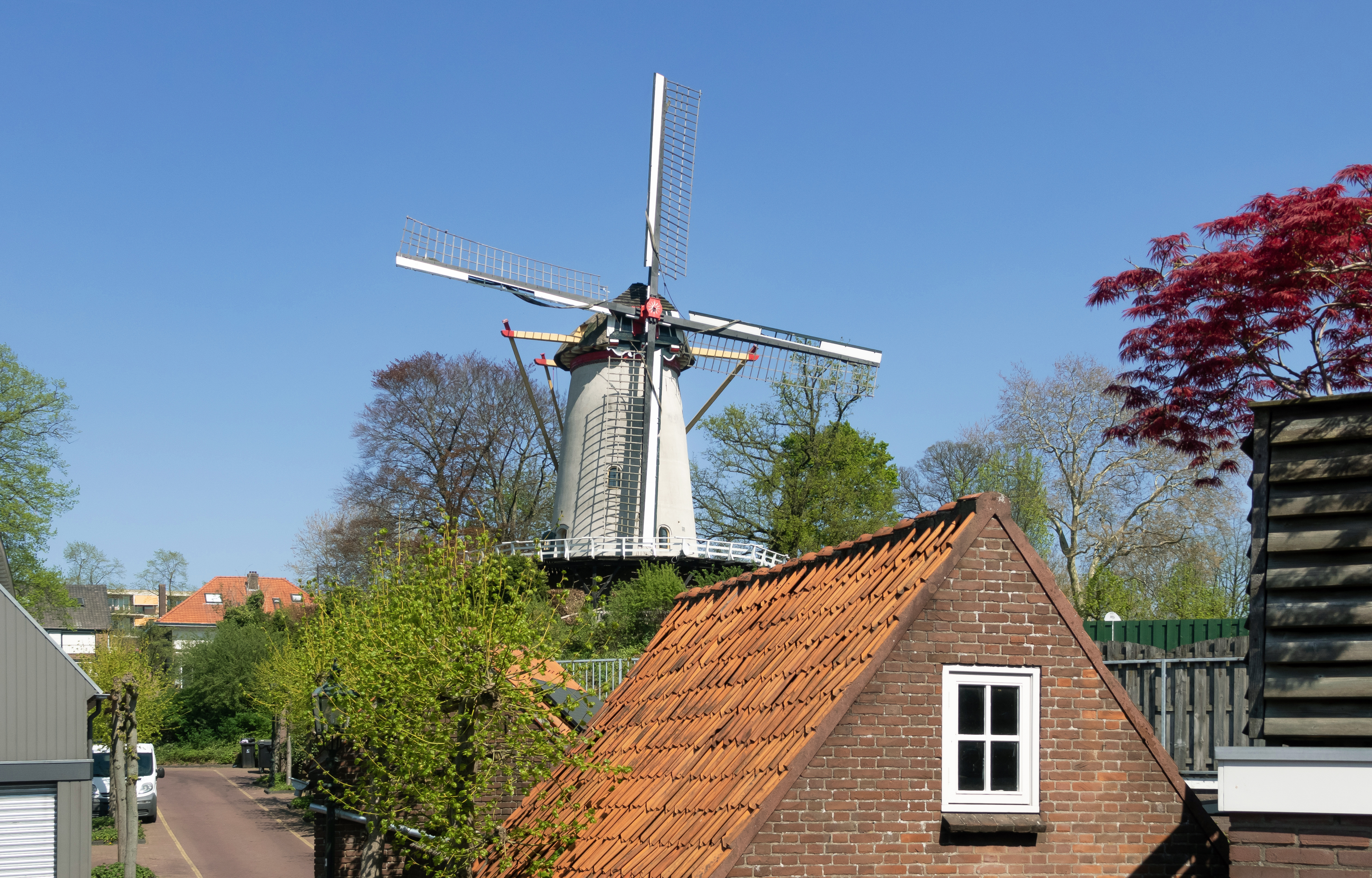
Windmill: the Binnenmolen

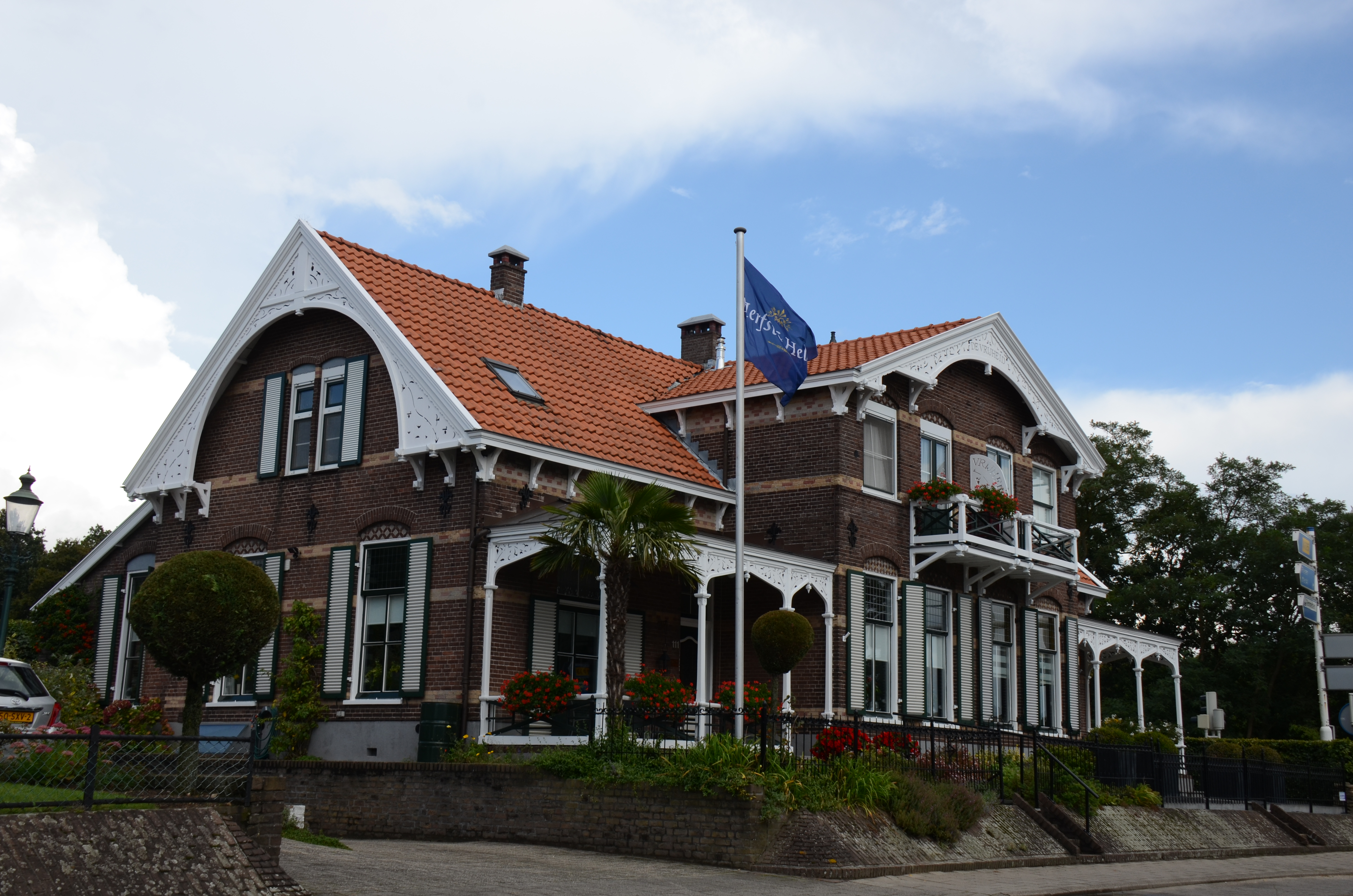
Houses in Rhenen with characteristic wooden ornaments

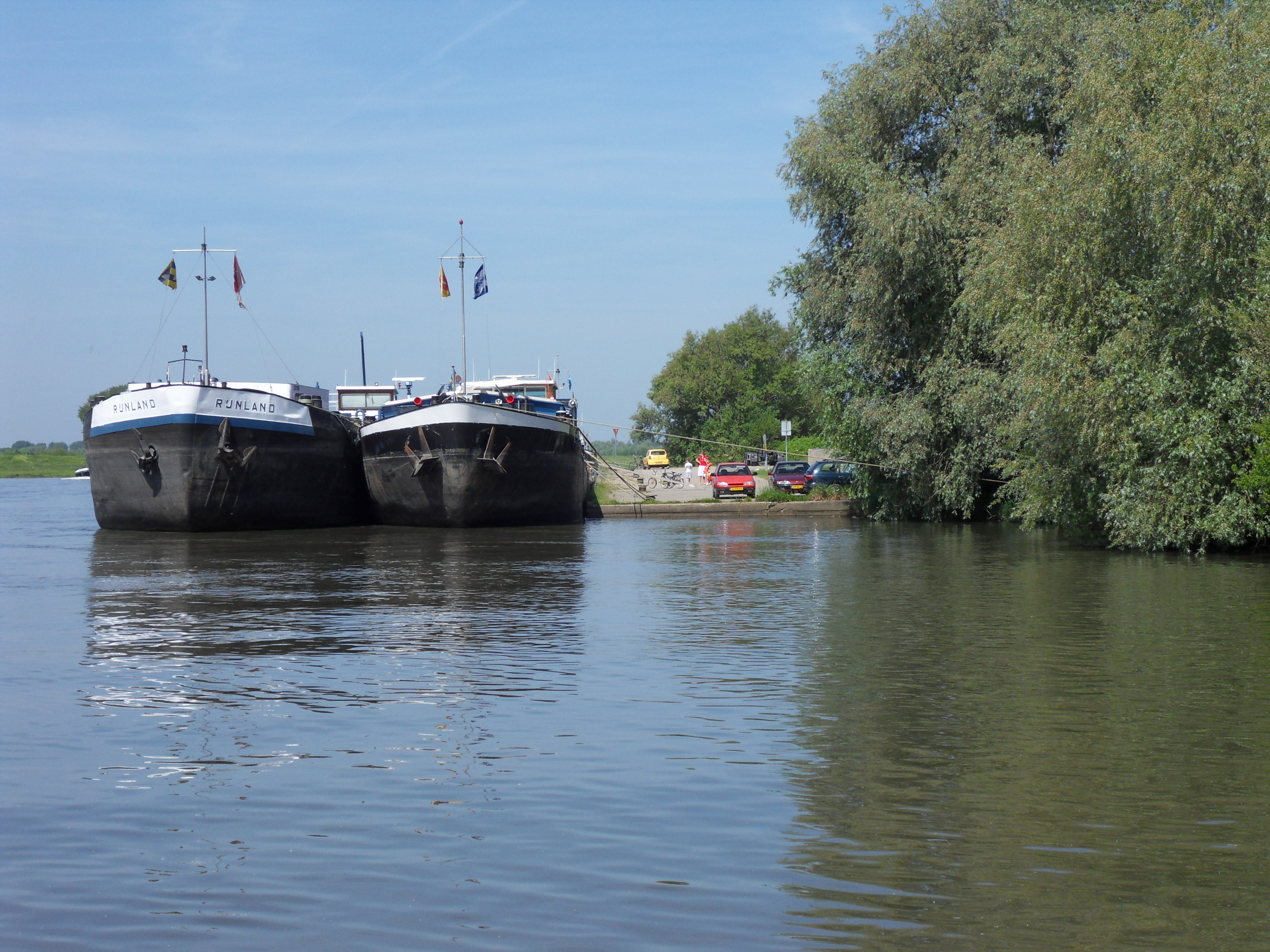
Haven van Rhenen

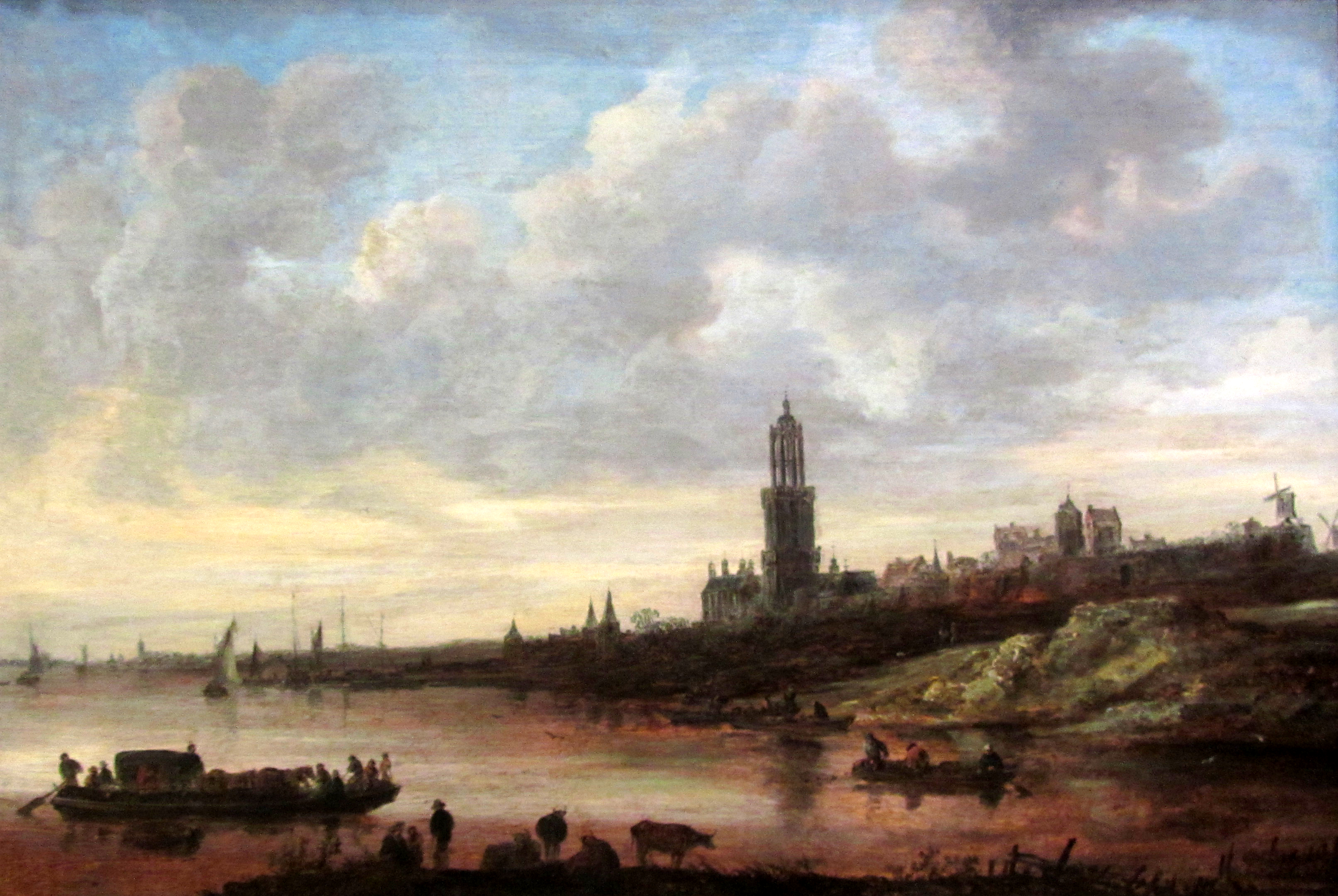
View of Rhenen, Jan Van Goyen, 1656

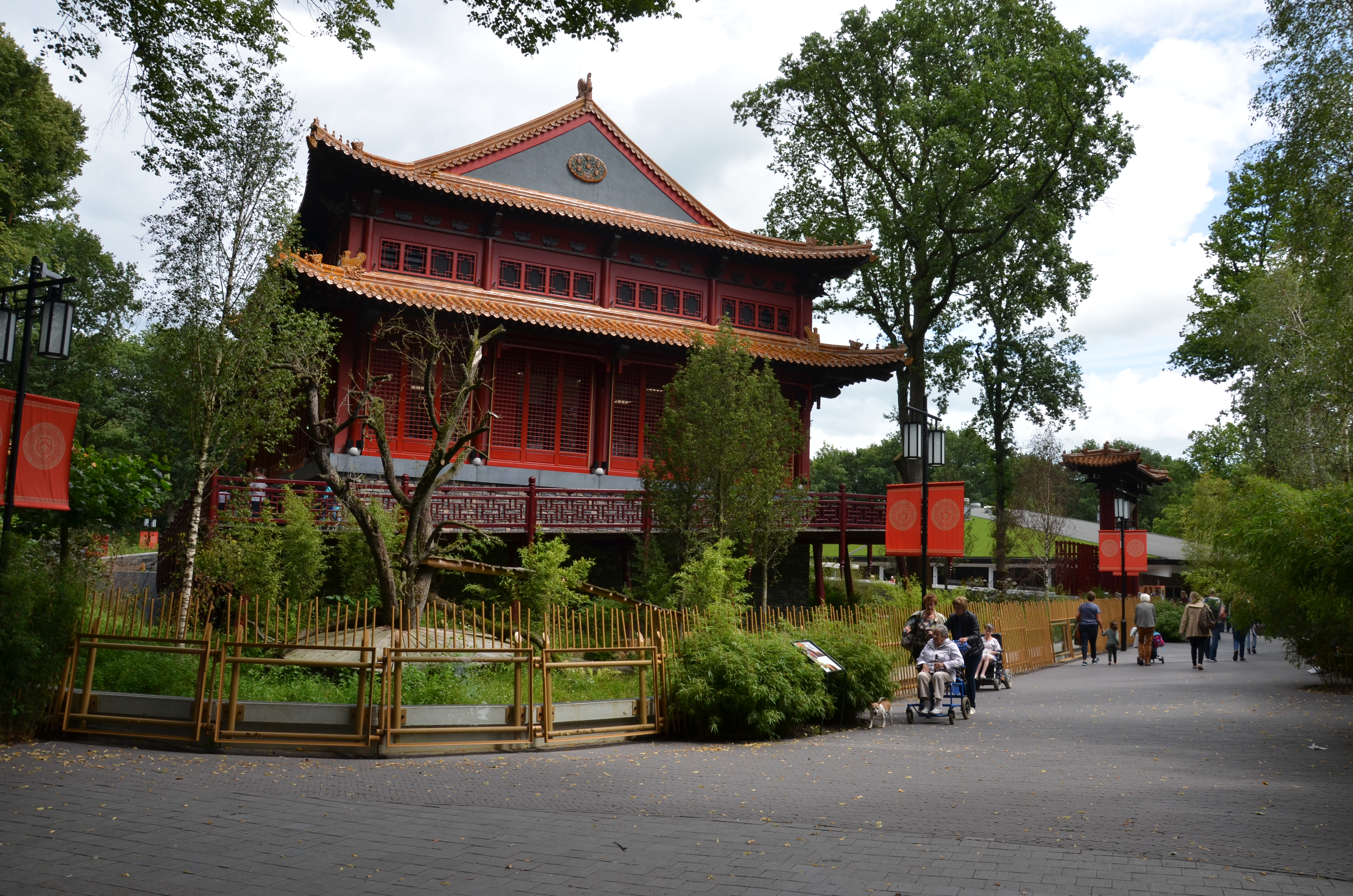
Pandasia Ouwehands Dierenpark

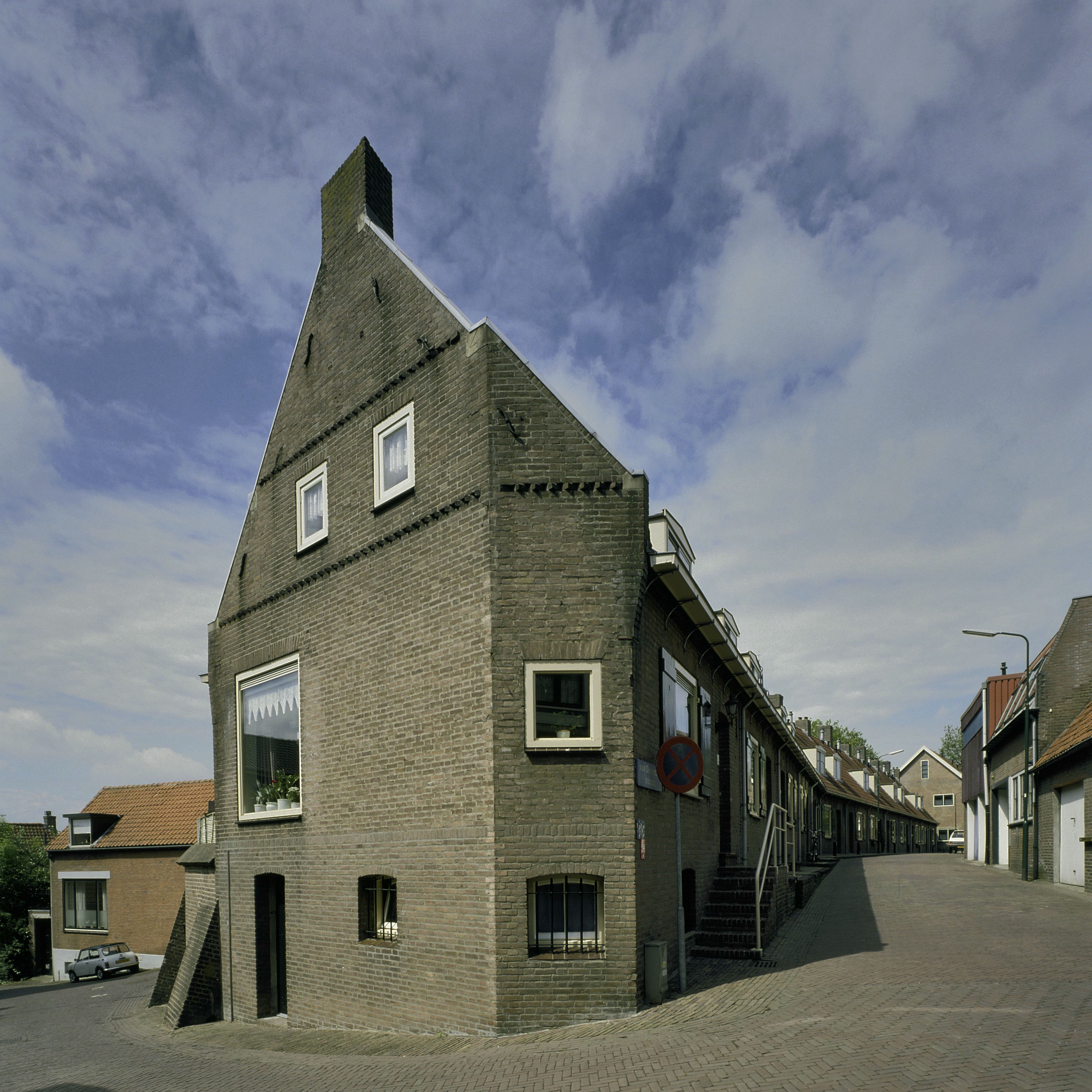
Straatbeeld, Rhenen

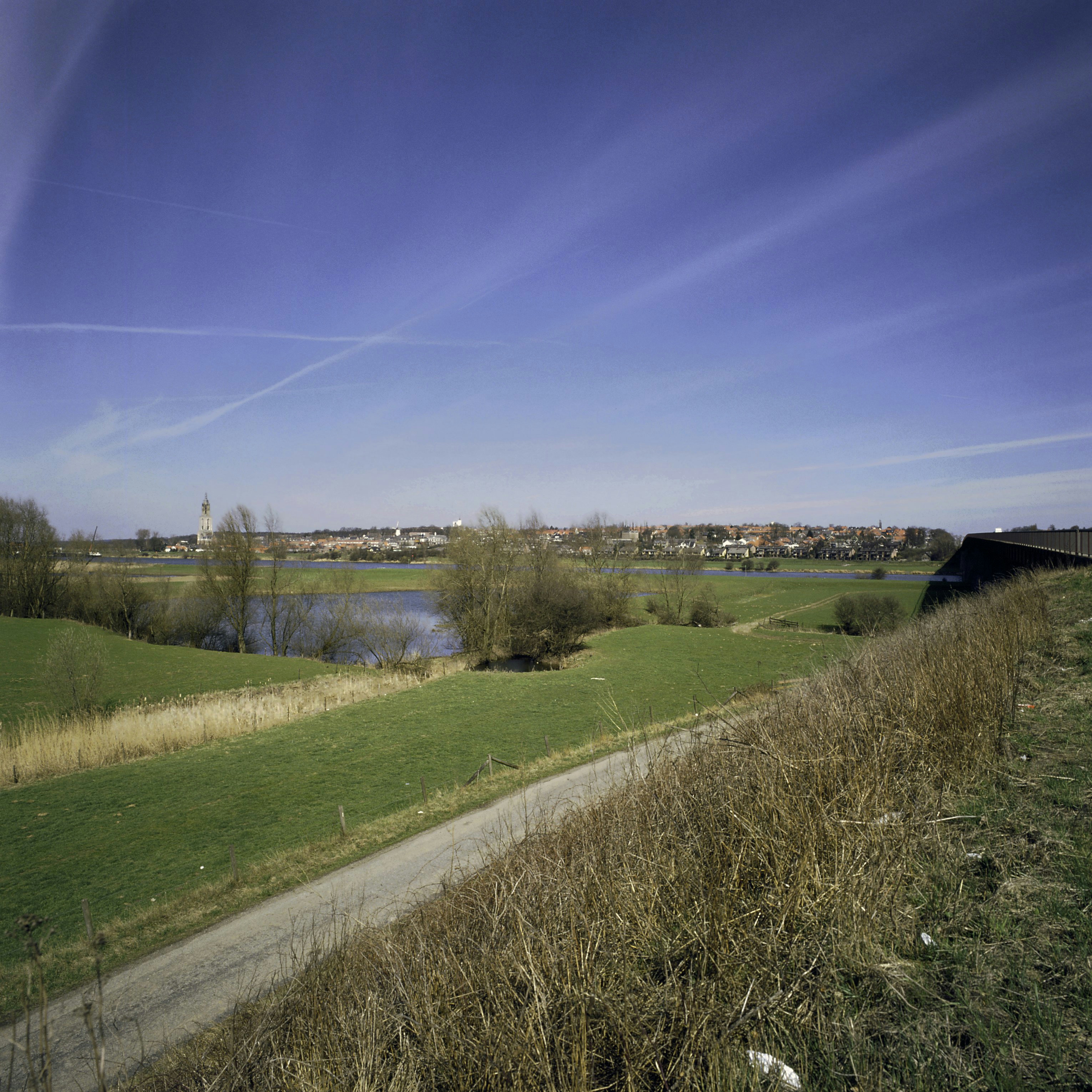
Gezicht op Rhenen

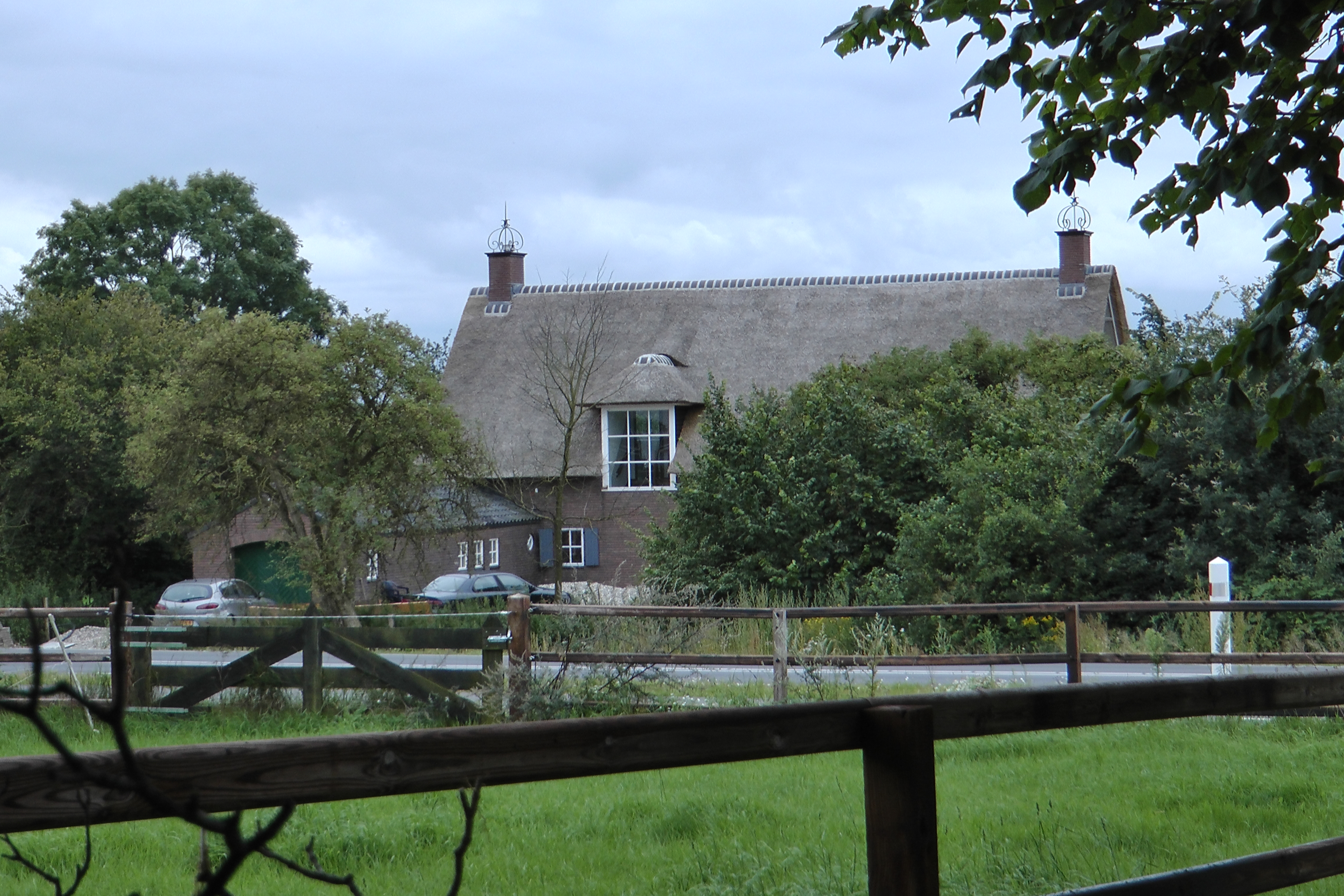
Rhenen, panoramio

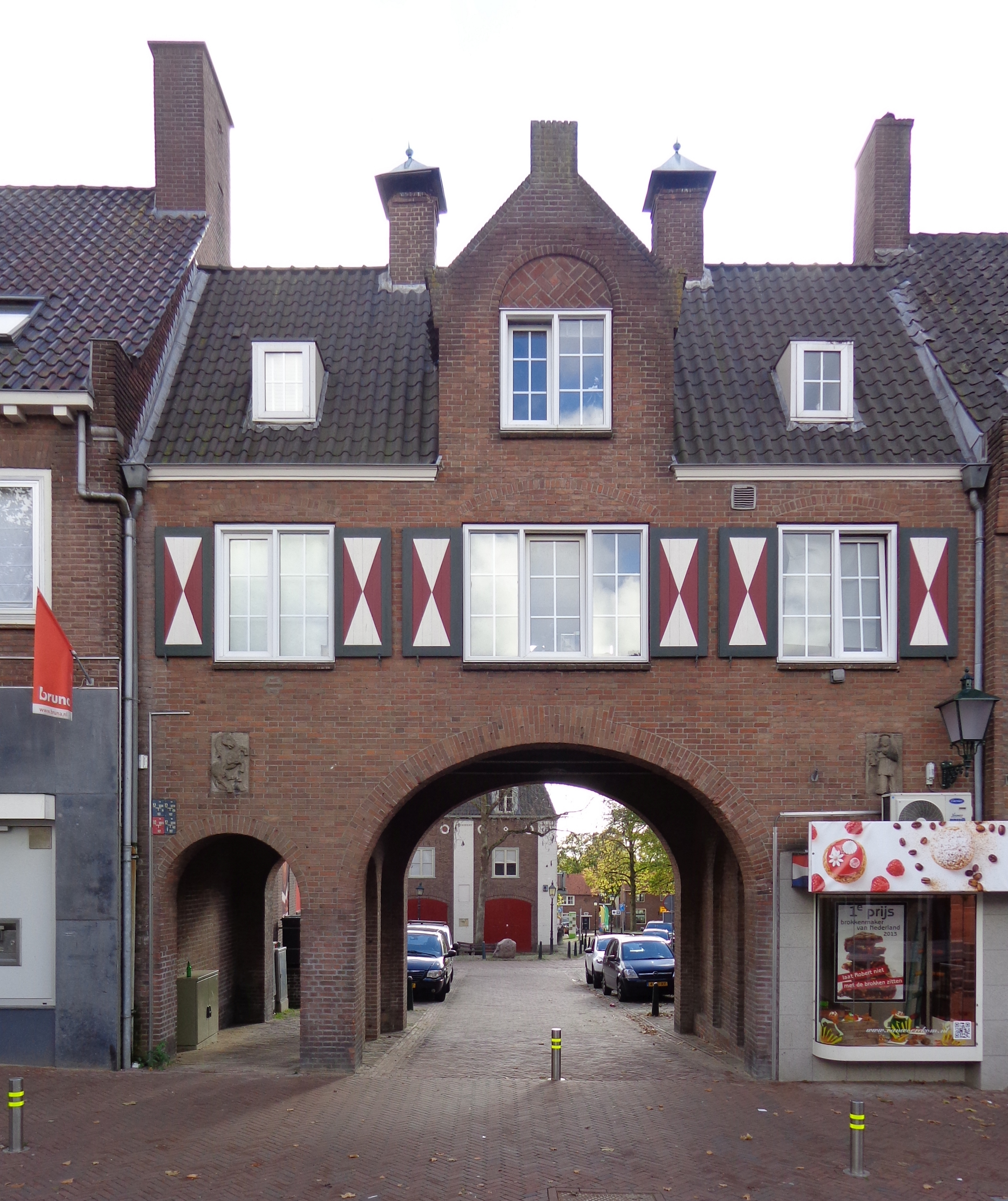
Rhenen, Frederik van de Paltshof Poort
