= Jacobus Tollius =

Dutch classicist

Jacobus or Jakob Tollius (1633, in Rhenen – 1696, in Utrecht) was a Dutch classicist.

Tollius was the younger half-brother of Alexander and Cornelis Tollius, who were professors at the University of Harderwijk. In Harderwijk he studied letters and medicine, obtaining a doctoral degree in the latter. After serving as a secretary to Nicolaas Heinsius he became head of the Latin School in Gouda. He was removed from this position after controversy over his liberal views. Eventually he became professor in Duisburg, where he resigned after converting to the catholic faith.

Tollius started wandering abroad, mostly in Italy, and died in utter misery in Utrecht.

Tollius was a renowned scholar of classical languages and antiquities. He published and commented such authors as Lucanus and Pseudo-Longinus.

== Works ==
- Epistolae Itineraries, Amsterdam, 1700
