= Warehouses Medan, Bindjeij and Laboean =

- Pakhuizen Medan, Bindjeij en Laboean
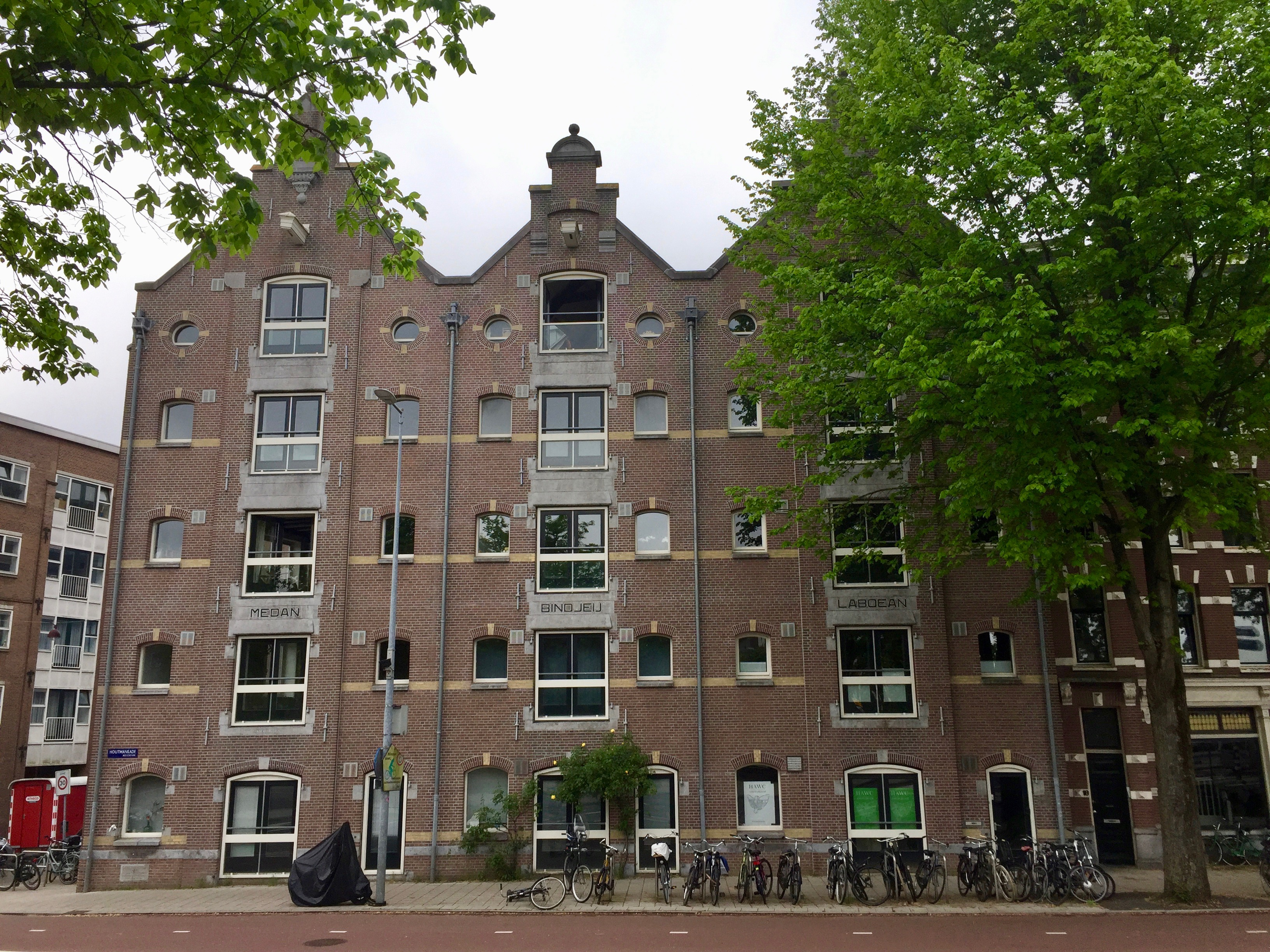
- Three warehouses at the Houtmankade

- Location within Amsterdam

General information
- Classification: Historical monument
- Location: Houtmankade, Amsterdam, Nova Zemblastraat 2-6, 1013 RK Amsterdam, Netherlands
- Coordinates: 52.390125°N 4.884599°E

Design and construction
- Architect: Willem Hamer

Rijksmonument
- Official name: Nova Zemblastraat 2A 1013 RK te Amsterdam
- Type: Cultural
- Designated: June 24, 2003
- Reference no.: 526740
- Original function: warehouse
- Current function: residential apartments

As a continuation of the existing warehouses in the center of Amsterdam, around 1900 several new warehouses were built near the IJ bay. Most of these warehouses were converted into apartments at the end of 20th century.

== History ==
The area, where the Laboean, Bindjeij and Medan warehouses were built, was known as the Braker Buiten Polder in the mid-19th century. The construction site was almost against the former Westelijke Afsluitdijk. On an elder map from 1746 this area was called Slooten Buyten Dycks. This area was more or less protected by a low summer dike called Kadyck. The warehouses have been built on the grounds of this Kadyck.

The three warehouses at the Houtmankade were designed by architect Willem Hamer, who also designed some striking 19th-century buildings in Amsterdam, such as the Hotel de l'Europe. The construction of the warehouses started on July 22, 1895. On September 14 in the same year, the construction progressed so far that the founder and director of the Deli Company, Peter Wilhelm Janssen, could lay the foundation stone. In the years 1898-1900 the Deli Company expanded its storage facilities with the adjacent warehouses Serdang, Langkat and Deli (Nova Zemblastraat 8-12). All of these warehouses were used mainly for tobacco storage.

In 1897, during the great city expansions of Amsterdam, George Hendrik Breitner recorded the construction pits and piling activities on Van Diemenstraat. The warehouses Laboean, Bindjeij and Medan near the Westerkanaal and close to the Westerkeersluis (flood barrier) can be seen in the background of these pictures and paintings made by Breitner.

== Naming ==
The names of the warehouses refer to the locations Medan, Bindjeij (Binjai) and Laboean (Labuhan) in the sultanate of Deli at Sumatra, former Dutch East Indies, and modern day Indonesia, where the Deli Company had their possessions. Since 2003 the three warehouses together are marked as a Rijksmonument, which is officially recorded under registration number 526740.

== From warehouse to a residential building ==
The three warehouses at the Houtmankade were renovated in 1986, where all spaces were converted to units with a residential and / or business function. As part of the renovation, the central part of the Bindjeij was demolished to make way for the courtyard. The rear part of the Bindjeij was converted into a joint stairwell which includes also an elevator. As a result, all units became accessible. The part next to the warehouses, which previously provided direct access to the outside area, was rebuilt as the main entrance of the apartment complex, main hall corridor and additional storage facilities for the apartments. For this reason the main entrance to the complex appears now on the Nova Zemblastraat instead of the Houtmankade.

Due to the new main entrance the original house numbers Houtmankade 20-24 were changed into Nova Zemblastraat 2A-6L. Since 2016 all 24 apartments, which are divided over 5 floors, have a residential function. The warehouses together are called 'De Kleine Houtman' as a distinction from another building 'De Houtman', which is located on the other side of the Nova Zemblastraat.

As part of the renovation, the courtyard was decorated with a sculpture ‘three-dimensional nature fragments’. This sculpture was designed by the Dutch artist, Ger Zijlstra (25 June 1943 – 7 June 2020).

== Building characteristics ==
The different characteristics of the warehouses have been preserved on the outside as well as on the inside. The warehouses are designed in a neo-Renaissance style with elements such as stepped gables (with triangular and semicircular frontons), consoles and decorative bands with yellow brickwork. In terms of type, this storage building fits in with the warehouses from the Dutch Golden Age.

Inside, the cast-iron columns, together with the robust wooden beams on which the floors rest, still reinforce the load-bearing structure of the warehouses. The cast-iron columns are finished with (reinforced) concrete for sufficient fire resistance. The wooden rafters that support the roof are still visible in the apartments on the top floor.

== Foundation ==
Since the soil beneath Amsterdam is weak, many buildings in the city are built on wooden pilings. This also applies to these warehouses. A multiple piled beam construction has been applied to ensure foundational stability. The wooden beams were driven into a deeper layer of sand that is solid enough to bear the weight of the building. A stone foundation was built on top of those pilings. All foundation materials made of wood are located below groundwater level and are water-saturated. This method prevents the wood from containing oxygen, which helps to avoid material degradation.

The soil below these warehouses consists mainly of clay with a peat layer of 1 meter thickness at a depth of 5 meters. The first layer of sand with sufficient loading capacity is located between 13.3 and 15.6 meters below ground level.

The wooden piles are located under the inside and outside walls of the building and underneath the 15 cast-iron columns, which are fitted indoors. The piles are within a short distance (< 20 inches) of each other. In total, nearly 700 piles have been driven into the soil to support all three warehouses.
