= Deli Company =

Indonesian tobacco company

Deli Company (Dutch: Deli Maatschappij) is a trading and distribution company in the timber, construction product and tobacco industries. It began as large tobacco plantation and production operation established in 1869 by the Dutch in Sumatra. It was granted a land concession by the Sultanate of Deli.

The company relied on immigrant coolie labor. Black shank was a problem and was researched on the plantation. Publicly traded on the Amsterdam stock market, it was the first modern company to pay large annual stock dividends. Jacobus Nienhuys founded the company. A few years later he returned to the Netherlands after being indicted for the death of 7 workers and administration of the company was taken over by Jacob Theodoor Cremer who became its largest shareholder. The company's headquarters was constructed in Medan in 1911.

The company diversified into tea, rubber and other industries and acquired other companies over the years. Deli Company's tobacco business was nationalized by Indonesia along with other Dutch enterprises in 1958 under Indonesian president Sukarno. The state-owned Plantation Nusantara Group (PTP) took over the tobacco business but the Deli Company continued operations in other areas and businesses. It is now a wholly owned subsidiary of Universal Corporation. The business was established near the Deli River.

== History ==
The company was established in Medan, then just a village, but conveniently located at the confluence of the Deli and Babura Rivers. Business grew rapidly. The company gained a commanding position in the area's tobacco trade, running 10 huge estates and eventually controlling exports with a monopoly. It developed railroads including 54 stations and built a field hospital. As the company and Medan grew, the Sultan of Deli (Ma'mun Al Rashid) moved his residence from Labuhan and Medan became the capital of North Sumatra in 1891.

Beside the possessions in Dutch East Indies the Deli Company had a lot of assets in both Amsterdam and Rotterdam to ensure smooth operations, e.g.:

- Offices at Herengracht 286, 380 and 586, Amsterdam
- warehouse Het Veem, Amsterdam
- warehouses Medan, Bindjeij and Laboean
- Warehouse Wijnhaven, Rotterdam

Cigar smoking declined in the 1920s and the industry was hit hard by the Great Depression a decade later.

== Gallery ==
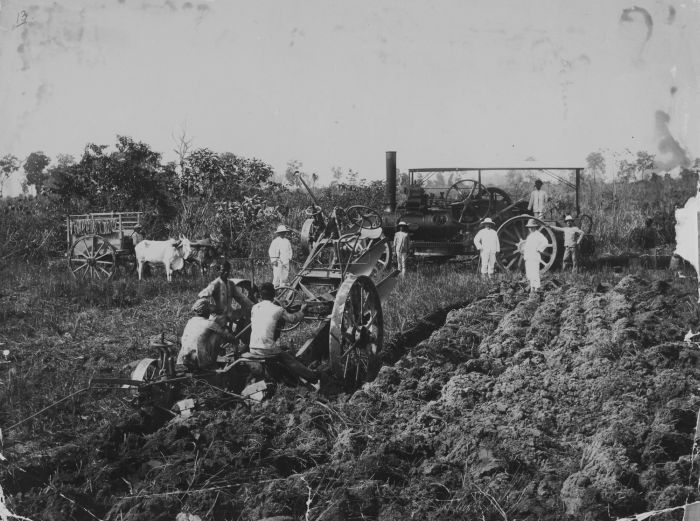
Fieldworkers with an ox cart and steam plow

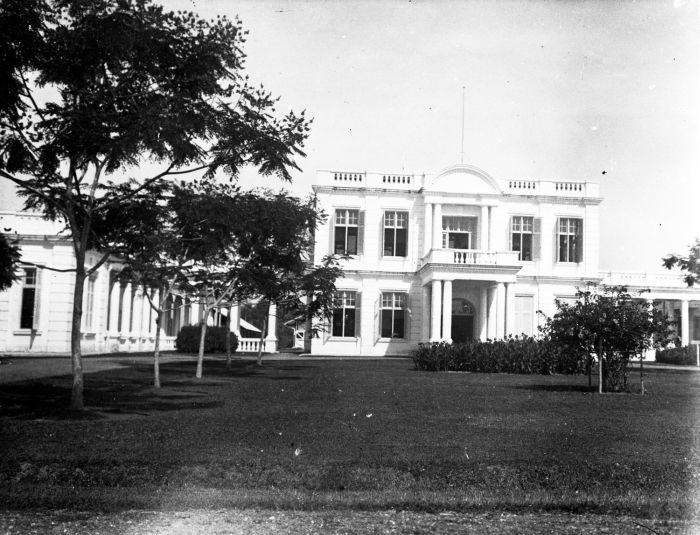
Deli Company experimental station in Medan (1919)

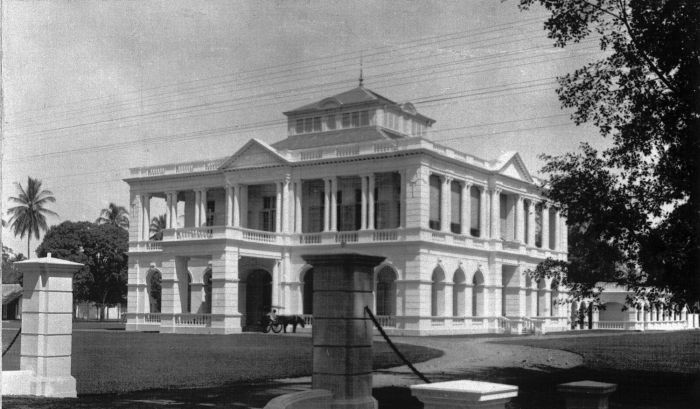
Headquarters in Medan circa 1925

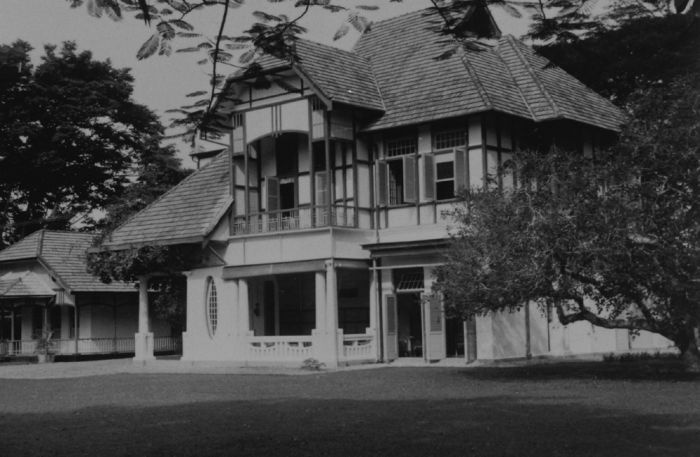
Director's house at the experimental station (1927)

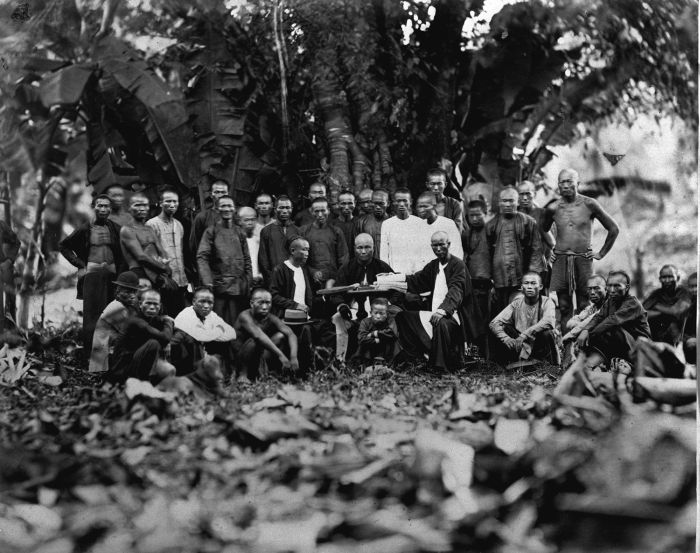
Chinese laborers, photo by Kristen Feilberg

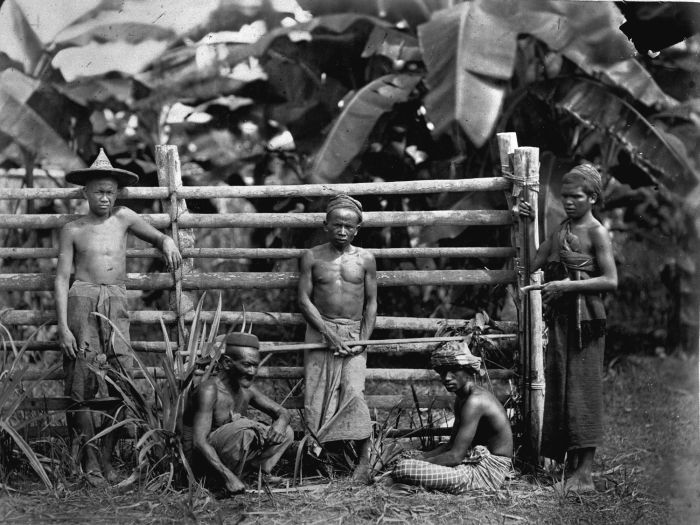
Workers

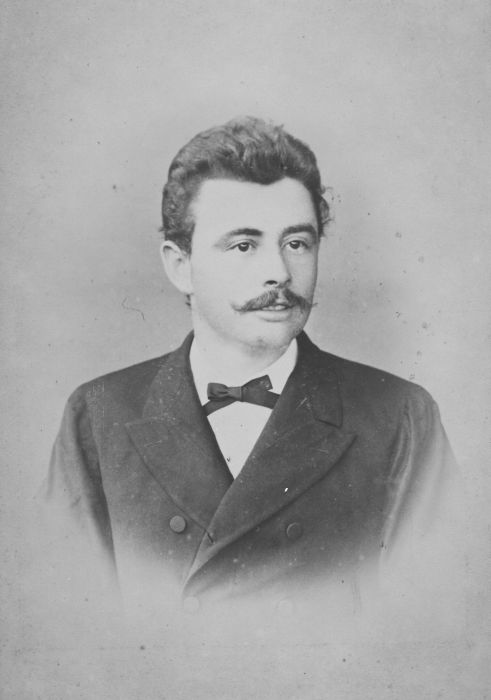
Administrator Nieuwenhuis

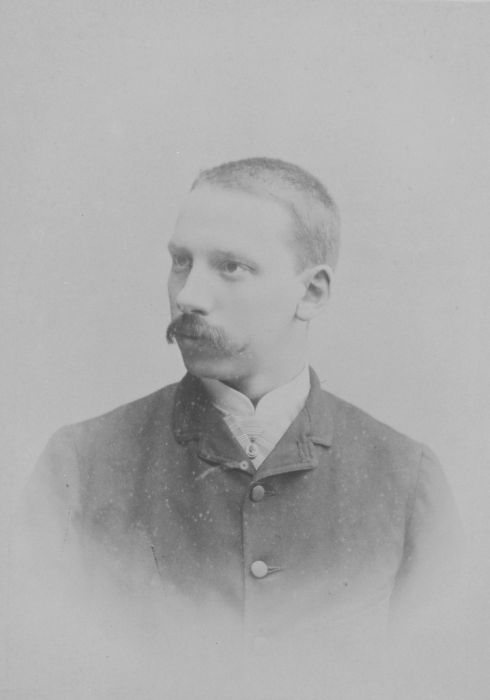
H. Ingerman, principal administrator from 1897 to 1901 at the Deli Company

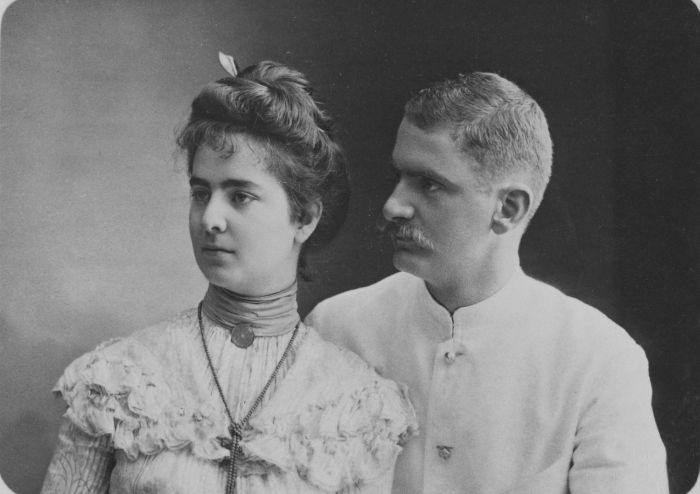
Portrait of the administrator Van Tijen, who served from 1911-1916, with his spouse

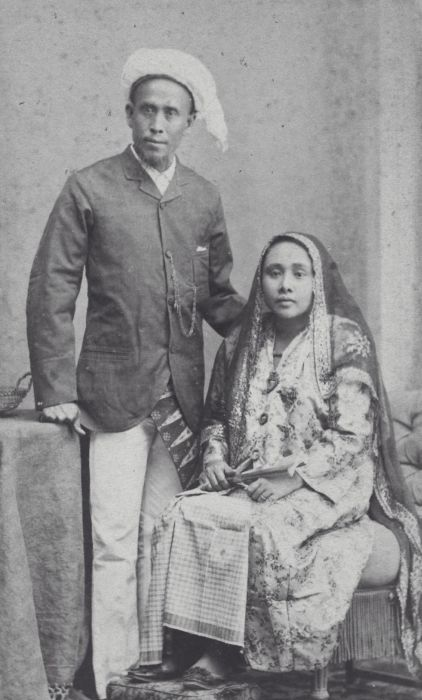
Portrait of a "hoofdschrijver", head clerk, with his wife circa 1900

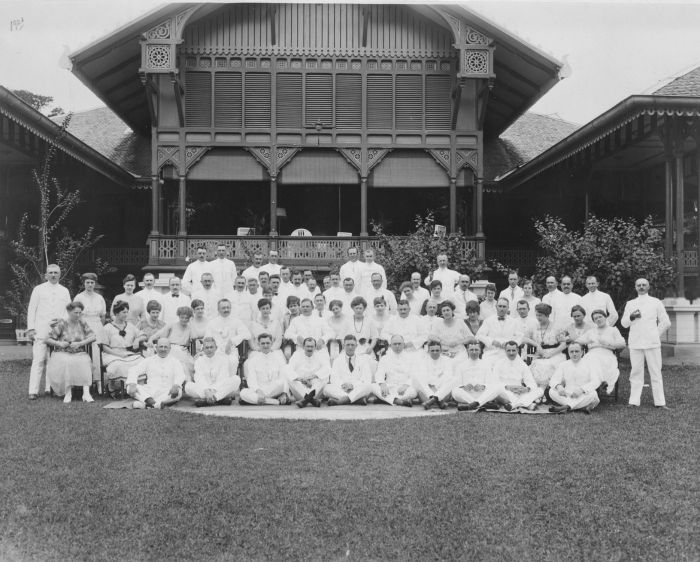
Employees in Medan (1921)

== See also ==
- Deli Railway
- Deli Sultanate
- Deli Serdang Regency
