= Saint Cunera =

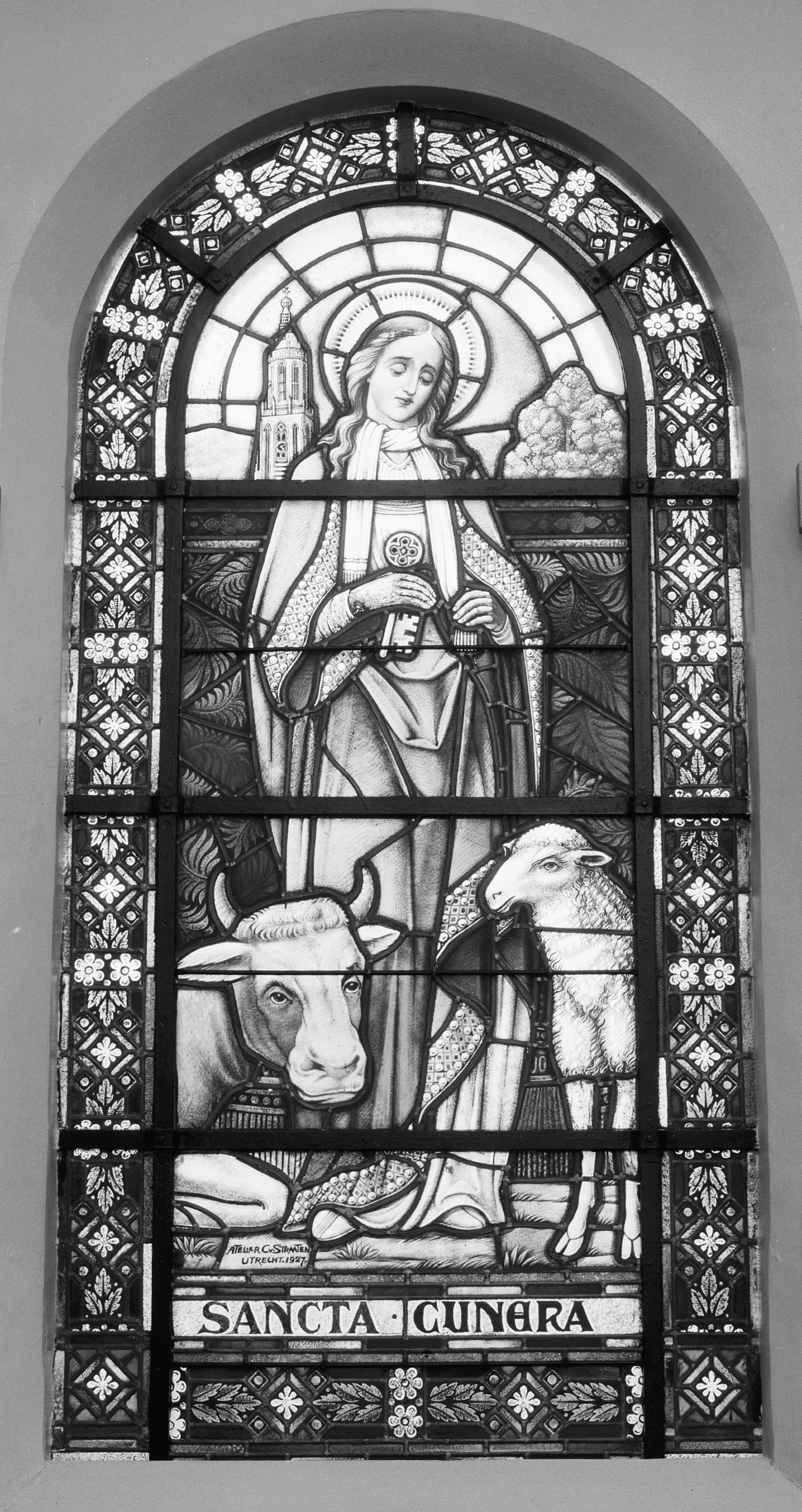
Saint Cunera

Saint Cunera of Rhenen, also Kunera (strangled to death in Rhenen, diocese of Utrecht, 28 October 340) was a virgin and martyr. Her name is first mentioned in the 11th century. Cunera is the patron saint of the city of Rhenen in the Netherlands, and a protector of horses and against animal diseases and sore throat. Her attributes are the key and the scarf.

== Life ==
According to the 14th-century legend, only one virgin survived the massacre when Saint Ursula and her eleven thousand virgins were martyred in Cologne, Germany, by the Huns during the fourth century. Her name was Cunera — a princess from the Orkney Islands. The King of the Rhine abducted her under his cloak and took her to his palace in Rhenen. Here she became deeply loved by the people for her kindness and care for the poor. She earned the King's support, who entrusted her with the key to his cellars. This aroused the jealousy of the King's wife. While the King went out hunting, Cunera was strangled to death by the Queen, by means of a scarf. Cunera's body was secretly buried in a stable. The crime was miraculously discovered thanks to the horses. The queen committed suicide by jumping off a cliff. Her chamberlain, who had assisted her in the murder, was beheaded. After her death, Cunera brought about many healings and rescues from drowning.

== Controversy ==
The Latin and Dutch versions of legend of Cunera date from the 14th and 15th centuries. The historical events underlying the legend cannot be determined. Just as Ursula's the historicity of Cunera must be doubted. During the late 15th century, the king was identified as Radbod, King of the Frisians (died 719), who was supposed to have assisted the Huns in the siege of Cologne. In fictional genealogical treatises, his grandson and namesake Radbod was married to Amarra, Princess of the Hungary (the land of the Huns). Recent fiction has given her the name of Adelgonde.

== Veneration ==
The Utrecht bishop Saint Willibrord (d. 739) is said to have announced Cunera's canonization. During the Late Middle Ages a great pilgrimage took place during the annual horse fair at Rhenen. Eventually this led to the consecration of the local St Peter's church to Cunera. The church was later replaced by the present Cunera-Church and the Cunera-Tower (completed in 1531). As a result of the Protestant Reformation in 1580 the Cunera-church was stripped of its images of saints. Cunera's relics were moved to Emmerich in the Duchy of Cleves and to Bedaf in Uden. The scarf, wurgdoek or dwale which had her strangled is now hosted by the Museum Catharijneconvent. Scientific research has proven that it is a 5th-century cloth, woven of Coptic linen. The feast of Cunera is celebrated on June 12.

== Sources ==
- "Cunera". Online Dictionary of Netherlands (in Dutch). 2017.
