= Cunerakerk =

Church in Rhenen, Netherlands

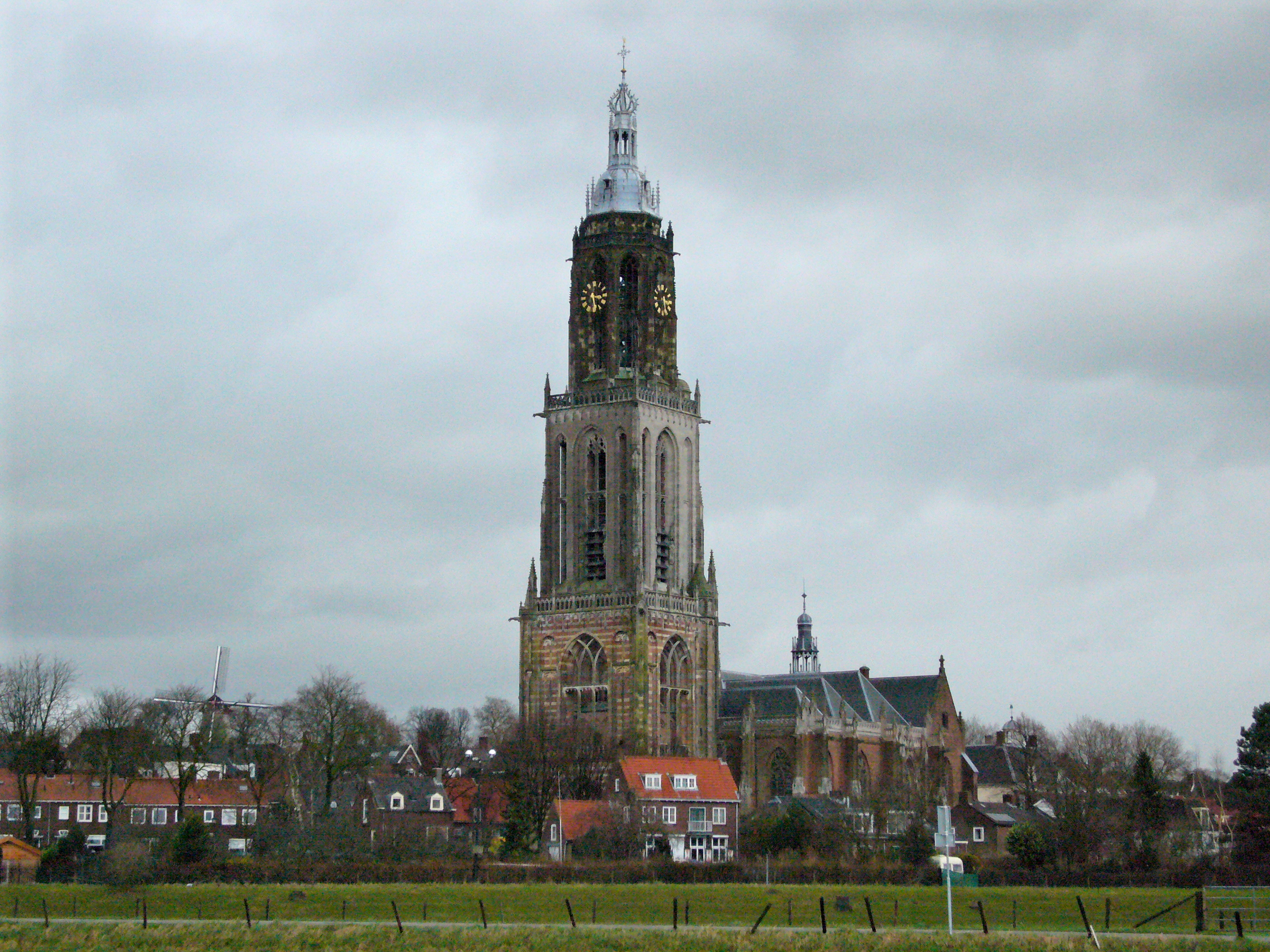
- Cunerakerk

Religion
- Affiliation: Protestantism

Location
- Location: Rhenen, Netherlands
- Interactive map of Cunerakerk
- Coordinates: 51.9570°N 5.5643°E

Architecture
- Type: Church
- Style: Gothic
- Groundbreaking: 1492
- Completed: 1531
- Height (max): 81.8 m (268.37 ft)
- Designated as NHL: Dutch rijksmonument #32453, #32454

The Cunerakerk is the main church of Rhenen, Netherlands. During the Middle Ages it was an important pilgrimage site. The church has stored the relics of the Saint Cunera since the 8th century. The tower has a height of 81.8 metres (268 ft).

== History ==
The first church on site was dedicated to Petrus (before 11th century). In the 11th century the church was dedicated to Saint Cunera. A legend tells about her stay at the court of king Radboud in Rhenen. The church was built and enlarged in the 15th century. The tower was built from 1492 until 1531 and its design is inspired by the Domtoren in Utrecht.

Since the Reformation in 1580 the Cunerachurch is in use by the Protestants. The relics of Cunera have been dispersed since then.

The church has often been damaged. In 1897 the tower burned and a restoration was done with a different spire (designed by Pierre Cuypers). During the next restoration in 1934 the roof burned down and during restoration of the roof a section collapsed. In 1940 the tower and church were damaged by war, and in 1945 it was again heavily damaged by the war. The building material used for subsequent repairs was so bad that in 1968 restoration of the tower was necessary again.

== Interior ==
The rood screen of the choir was built in 1550 in the Renaissance style. It is one of the few rood screens still existing in the Netherlands. It is decorated with allegoric images of the three theological virtues: faith, hope and love. Part of the sculpture is gone. The choir stalls were carved in 1570.

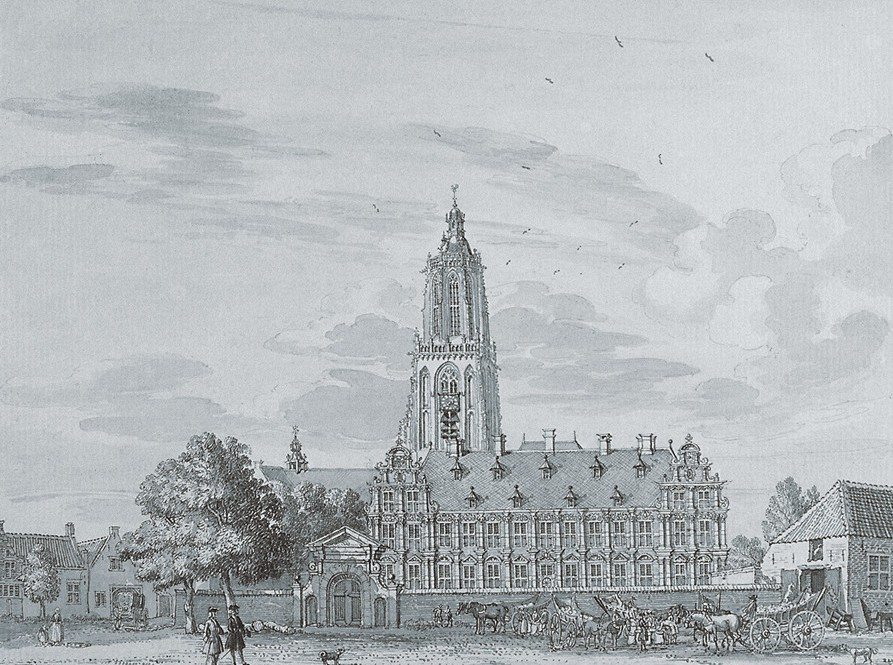
The tower behind the Königshaus

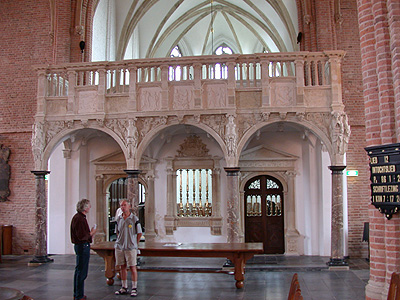
The Rood screen of choir in the Cunerakerk

== See also ==
- List of tallest structures built before the 20th century
