= Jacob Theodoor Cremer =

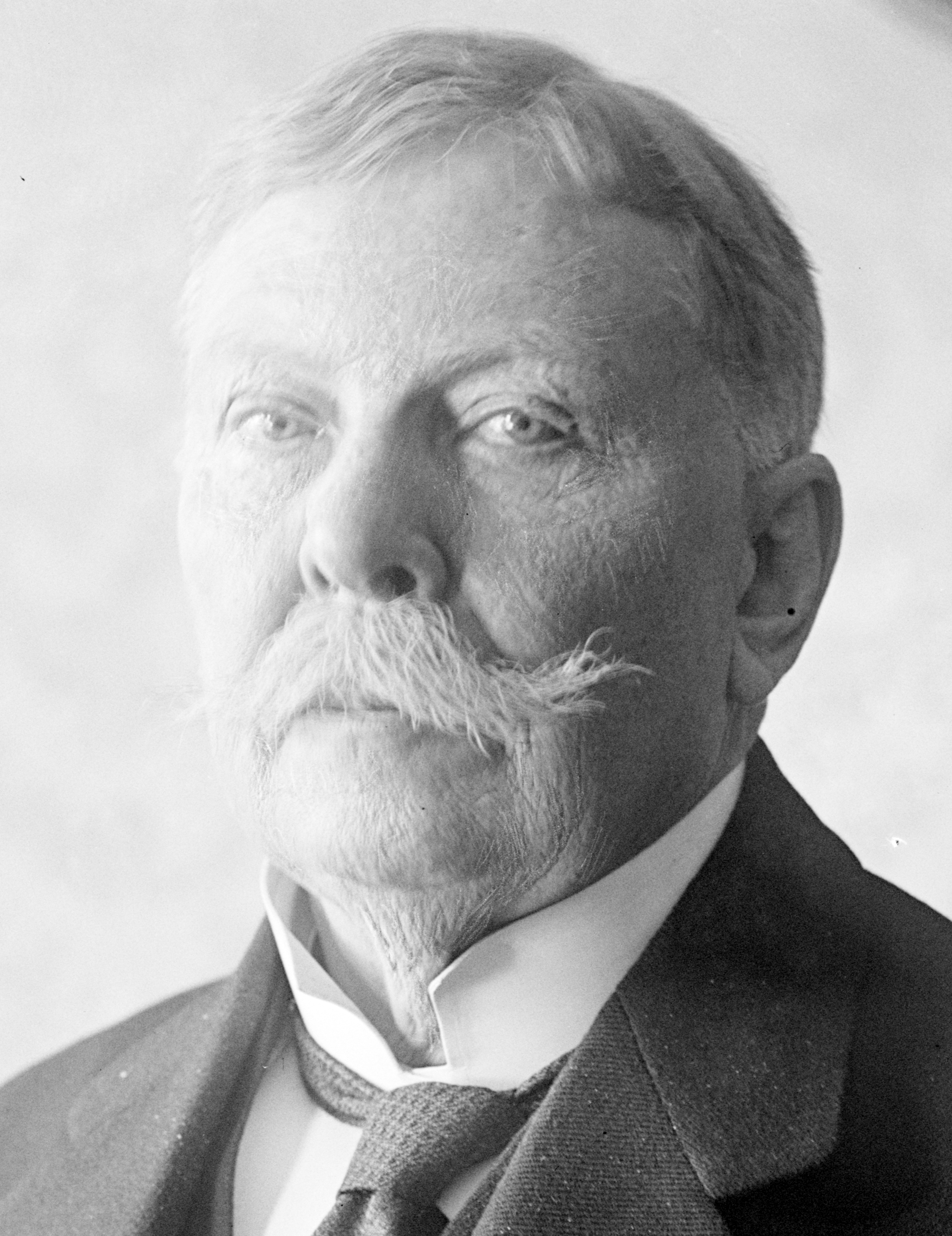
Portrait (1918)

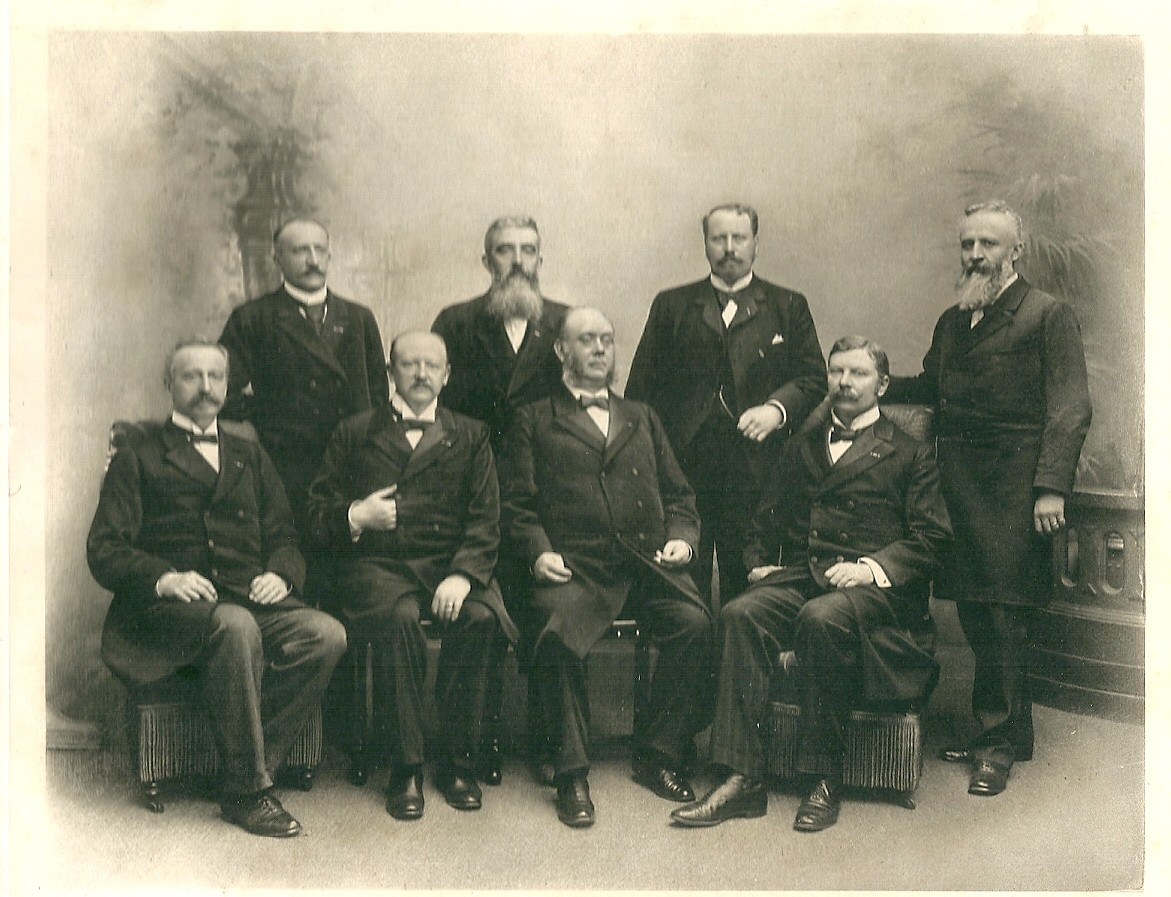
Cremer in the Nicolaas Pierson government (seated bottom right)

Jacob Theodoor Cremer (born 30 June 1847 in Zwolle – died 14 August 1923 in Amsterdam) was a tobacco magnate and administrator for the Deli Company in Sumatra. He was from the Netherlands. He also became a politician and was a member of the Lower House (1884–1894 and 1901–1905). From 1897 – 1901 he was Minister of Colonies. He was President Dutch Trading Company, Amsterdam (1907–1912).

Cremer began working the Dutch East Indies for the Dutch Trading Company in Batavia (now Jakarta).

Cremer bought the Duin and Kruidberg estate in Santpoort and lived in the "House of Columns" in Amsterdam during the winter. He co-initiated of the Coolie Ordinance (1880) which restricted workers from changing employers and allowed corporal punishment. The ordinance was revoked in 1931 after the United States threatened a boycott of Dutch products.

He founded the Netherlands Shipbuilding Company, and co-founded the Bouwonderneming Jordan NV, Royal Packet-Society, Dutch Shipbuilding Company and in 1910 the Society Colonial Institute (now Royal Tropical Institute) with Dr. Henri François Rudolf Hubrecht. He authored the first Dutch-Indonesian Mining Law. From 1907 to 1913 he was president of the Nederlandsche Handel-Company. He co-founded the Colonial Institute in Amsterdam in 1910.

In 1912 he sold his house on the Herengracht to Cornelis Johannes Karel van Aalst, and lived permanently in Santpoort. In 1920 he became a member of the Dutch Senate. Cremer served as ambassador to the United States from van 17 October 1918 until May 1921.

== Gallery ==
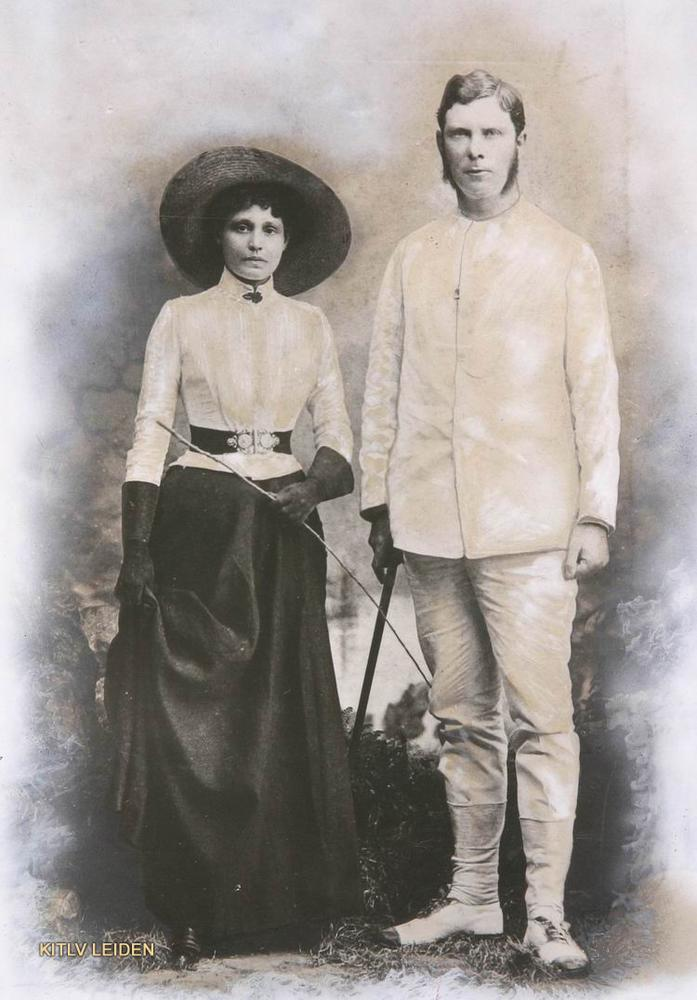
With his wife during their first stay in the Dutch East Indies (1860)

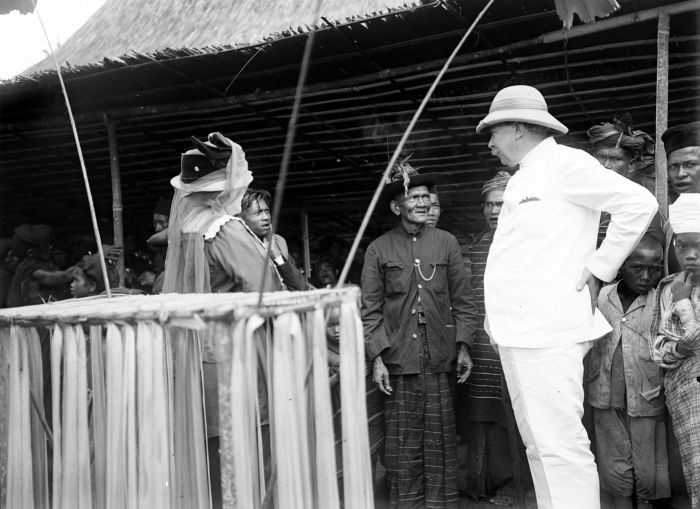
J.T. Cremer and his wife in a visit to a Karo people village (early 20th century)

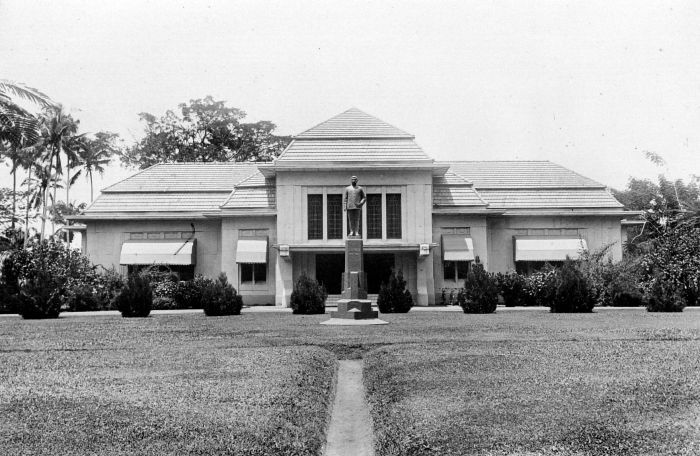
Statue of Cremer in front of the office of the Deli Planters Association

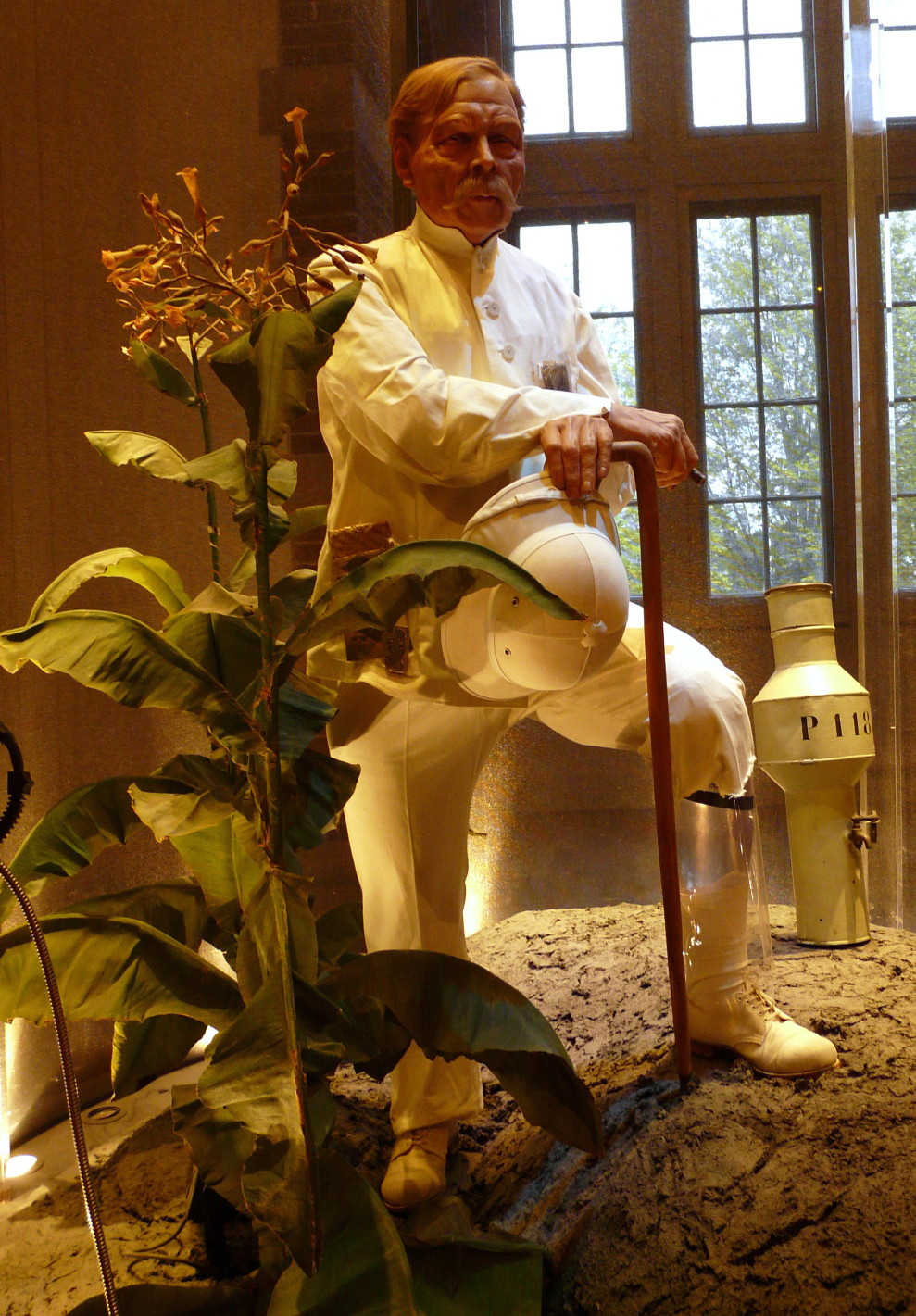
Statue at the Tropical Museum in Amsterdam
