= List of colonial buildings in Medan =

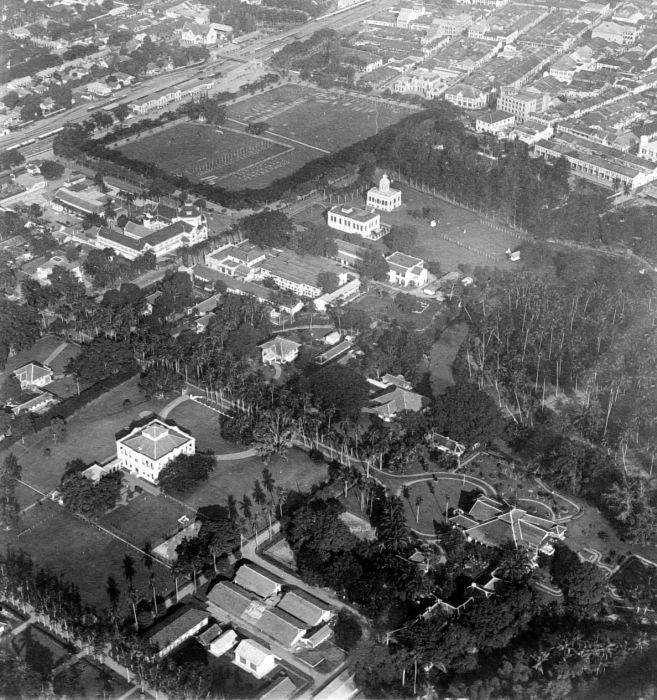
Dutch colonial buildings around the vicinity of the Esplanade (now Lapangan Merdeka) in the 1920s.

A variety of infrastructure were constructed in the city of Medan during the colonial period of Dutch East Indies, which is now Indonesia. Following the establishment of the Deli Company in 1869, the city was transformed rapidly from a small kampong (village) of a few hundred people into the largest city in Sumatra. When the Sultan of Deli moved his residence there in 1891, Medan became the capital of North Sumatra. Subsequent rapid development ushered in a western-centric architectural style used in a number of colonial buildings built in Medan. These buildings range from houses, offices, hotels, stores, houses of worship, hospitals, and schools. Despite its relatively late modernization compared to older cities like Jakarta and Makassar, Medan has an abundant colonial architectural heritage. 42 buildings have been officially declared of significant historical value.

Medan is divided into three settlements. The colonial settlement is the city centre and contains central government infrastructure, the shopping area of Kesawan, the military area between the Deli and the Babura Rivers, the affluent tropical garden city of Polonia, the central market, as well as various churches, hospitals, schools, factories, train stations, and the former airport. The Chinese settlement is a dense area on the eastern side of the Deli River, and intersects with Kesawan. The sprawling Muslim native settlement is located around three Muslim architectural works: the Istana Maimun (1888), Istana Lama (late 19th-century, now demolished) and the Great Mosque (1907) at the southern end of the city next to Kesawan and the Chinese settlements. Here, the Dutch redesigned the main buildings in an Orientalistic-Imperialist style, symbolising the dominance of the colony's cultural and political control.

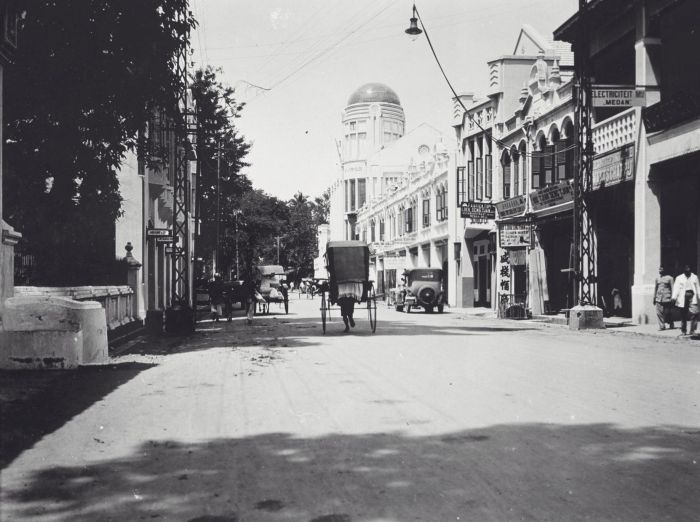
Kesawan is heavily influenced by tropical British architecture found in the Straits Settlements, especially Penang.

Medan's architecture, was closely linked to Penang Island's, as wealthy residents and the colonial government hired British and Dutch architects from the Straits Settlements. The central open plaza was called the Esplanade, similar to the one in George Town; it is now called Lapangan Merdeka. Shophouse construction and facades mimic those in the Straits. Kesawan's architecture fuses Dutch-British Tropical styles. Like other Indies cities, junctions were designed as nodes, where the corner buildings have a unique facade facing the junction. These included towers, a rounded or oblique construction, or a set-back, giving each building a unique look resulting in different urban nodes. Examples include the AVROS building (now the BKS-PPS building) and the warenhuis (department store; now the mostly-abandoned Angkatan Muda Pembaharuan Indonesia building).

Despite this abundance, many colonial buildings are being demolished or in threat of being demolished. Non-governmental organizations claimed that almost 90% of the 42 protected buildings had either been demolished or modified, despite provincial ruling No. 6/1988 which bans the tampering of these buildings. 73 buildings had not yet been protected; an example is the Mega Eltra building, constructed in 1912. It has since been demolished. Other heritage buildings that have been demolished are the Kerapatan building on Jl. Brig. Jen. Katamso, a bank building on Jl. Pemuda and the Public Works office on Jl. Listrik. These events are reasoned to the lack of city planning by the city's officials and the minimal awareness of history in Medan.

== List of buildings ==
=== Eclecticism (before 20th century) ===
Some of the first colonial buildings of Medan were concentrated around the "Esplanade" (now the Lapangan Merdeka), the station area, and around the Sultan's palace. Many of the first buildings were simple wooden structures, such as the hoofdkantoor van de Deli Maatschappij te Medan (The head office of the Deli Company in Medan), which during the time of its opening in 1870 was also used for a church, an administration building, a hospital and a feast hall, and the large wooden Old Sultan's Palace.

Last official name	Former names	Year	Architect	Location	Latest image	Oldest image
Agentschap van de NHM (Netherlands Trading Society); Demolished in 1930, on its site the Nederlands-Indische Handelsbank (now Bank Mandiri) was constructed	Agentschap van de NHM	1888	anonymous	3°35′20″N 98°40′41″E		
Dharma Deli Hotel	Hotel De Boer	1896-1898 1902	G.D. Langereis & Co	3°35′30″N 98°40′37″E		
Dinas Kebudayaan dan Pariwisata, (Department of Culture and Tourism)	Deli vrijmetselaarsloge	1892	anonymous	3°35′39″N 98°40′50″E		
Grand Hotel Medan (demolished, now Bank Negara Indonesia - KCP Medan Pulau Pinang)	Hotel de Vink	1884		3°35′22″N 98°40′47″E		
Hoofdkantoor van de Deli Maatschappij (demolished, and replaced with larger building in 1910)	Hoofdkantoor van de Deli Maatschappij	1869-1870	anonymous	3°35′35″N 98°40′31″E		
Istana Maimun	Istana Maimun	26 August 1888 - 18 May 1891	A.P. Melchior	3°34′31″N 98°41′02″E		
Kerapatan Deli, first building (demolished)	Delische Rijksraadgebouw		anonymous	3°34′47″N 98°41′04″E		
Lapangan Merdeka	de Esplanade	1880	anonymous			
Masjid Raya Al-Osmani Mosque		1901	G.D. Langereis & Co.	3°43′56″N 98°40′34″E		
Old Sultan's Palace (razed in 1946)	Istana Lama	late 19th-century		3°34′37″N 98°41′20″E		
Paleis van de Tengku Besar van Deli (destroyed by fire in 1921)	Istana Tengku Besar Deli	late 19th-century				
Piaggio/Vespa (revamped, only the facade remained)		1900s		3°35′11″N 98°40′46″E		
Seng Hap (abandoned, deteriorated)	生合	1900	anonymous	3°35′19″N 98°40′43″E		
Rumah Sakit PT Perkebunan Nusantara II Tembakau Deli, "PT Perkebunan Nusantara II Deli Tobacco Hospital"	Hospitaal Deli Maatschappij	1885				
Rumah Tjong A Fie	張阿輝 故居	1900s		3°35′08″N 98°40′50″E		
Sociëteit De Witte (first form, demolished)	Sociëteit De Witte (first form) in 1904 (second form)	1882 1904	G.D. Langereis (renovation and renewal in 1904)			
Standard Chartered Bank	Ambtswoning van de resident van het Oostkust van Sumatra (1898), Governor's house in Medan (Gouverneurshuis te Medan)	1898	J.C. van Es (1854-1918)	3°35′00″N 98°40′33″E		

=== Rationalism and Traditionalism (1900s – 1920s) ===
New technological possibilities gradually transformed the architectural style used in Medan into a modern form. Two architectural movements appeared in the Netherlands and the Netherlands East Indies: Dutch Rationalism and Traditionalism.

The works of Hendrik Petrus Berlage were the main inspiration for Dutch Rationalism; the subsequent style in the tropical climate of Indonesia is known as the New Indies Style. The style is the result of an attempt to develop new solutions to integrate traditional precedents with new technological possibilities. The best example in Medan is the Medan Post Office, a fusion of Romanesque arch, traditional Dutch-styled gables, and new technology. Most architects were in between 1910-1930 more open to global stylistic influences as Beaux-arts, Art deco, Expressionism, etc., than their colleagues in the Netherlands.

The Beaux-arts appeared in the 1910s. It is basically the revival of the late 19th-century eclecticism, but was inspired mainly by classicism. The best examples in Medan are Bank Indonesia (the former Javasche Bank, 1909) and the old Medan City Hall (1909). Unlike earlier low-quality architecture, the new traditionalist movement made use of modern materials, for example reinforced concrete and steel frames behind its classical facade. The classical facades are mostly of natural stone. The monumental character of this style was popular for offices, warehouses and garages.

Last official name	Former names	Year	Architect	Location	Latest image	Oldest image
Chung Chow School	祌州学校					
Abandoned building (2004-now)	Hoofdkantoor van Deli Maatschappij, head office of the Deli Company, Director's Office of PT Perkebunan IX (1959)	1914	P. Colijn	3°35′35″N 98°40′31″E		
Angkatan Muda Pembaharuan Indonesia (neglected, heavily deteriorated)	Medan's Warenhuis (1919), Kantor Departemen Tenaga Kerja Tk. I Sumut	1919	G. Bos	3°35′18″N 98°40′37″E		
Asuransi Jasindo	Stoormvaartmaatschappij Nederland en Rotterdamse Lloyd; Nederlands-Indische Handelsbank, NIH (until 1940)	early 20th-century		3°35′19″N 98°40′42″E		
Asuransi Jiwasraya	Nederlandsch-Indische Levensverzekerings en Lijfrente Maatschappij (NILLMIJ)	1919	S. Snuyf (from BOW)	3°35′03″N 98°40′48″E		
Bank Indonesia	De Javasche Bank	1909	Eduard Cuypers	3°35′27″N 98°40′37″E		
Bioskop Bali (demolished, now Vihara Medan)	Oranje Bioscoop; Gedung Kesenian; Restoran April Mop; Bioskop Bali (post-independence)	1908	possibly BOW	3.589886°N 98.681097°E		
BKS PPS (Badan Kerja-sama Perusahaan Perkebunan Sumatera), (Sumatra Planters Association) (1967)	AVROS (Algemeene Vereeniging van Rubberplanters ter Oostkust van Sumatera)	1918	G.H. Mulder	3°35′04″N 98°40′50″E		
Dharma Niaga	Carl Schlieper	1919		3°35′06″N 98°40′49″E		
Ford Motors Reparatie Werkplaats (abandoned, dilapidated)	Ford Motors Reparatie Werkplaats			3°35′14″N 98°40′33″E		
Gedung Balai Kota Lama	Raadhuis, Gemeentehuis Medan	1908-1909	Ch. M. Boon	3°35′25″N 98°40′38″E		
Gereja Kristen Indonesia Sumatera Utara	Gereformeerde Kerk	1918	Tj. Kuipers	3°35′02″N 98°40′18″E		
HKBP Sudirman Medan	Elisabethkerk	1 August 1912		3°34′39″N 98°40′39″E		
Kantor Gubernur Sumatera Utara	Proefstation Deli Tabak	1913		3°34′50″N 98°40′20″E		
Kantor Pos Medan (Medan Post Office)	Medan Post- en telegraafkantoor	1909-1911	S. Snuyf (from BOW)	3°35′31″N 98°40′39″E		
Katholiek schoolinternaat, (Roman Catholic boarding school)		1926	W. Jaski, Fermont-Cuypers.	3°35′20″N 98°40′07″E		
Kerapatan Deli, second building (demolished in 1946's social revolution)	Delische Rijksraadgebouw	1912		3°34′36″N 98°41′06″E		
Kereta Api (Persero) Divisi Regional I Sumatera Utara	Hoofdkantoor van de Deli Spoorweg Maatschappij	1918	Th. Karsten	3°35′38″N 98°40′47″E		
London Sumatera	Harrisons & Crosfield	1909	Herbert Walker	3°35′19″N 98°40′41″E		
Masjid Raya Medan	Grote Moskee; Masjid Raya	1909	Th. van Erp, W.H. Schadee, F. Vosse	3°34′30″N 98°41′14″E		
Mega Eltra	Lindeteves-Stokvis (demolished)	1921	C.P. Wolff Schoemaker.			
Tirtanadi Water Tower	Watertoren van Ajer Beresih Waterleiding Maatschappij en omgeving	1908		3°34′56″N 98°41′06″E		
Pasar Boender, (Round Market) (demolished, on its site stands the monument of Guru Patimpus)	Pasar Petissah, Pasar Petisah	1915	anonymous	3°35′29″N 98°40′16″E		
Pengadilan Negeri Medan dan Pengadilan Tinggi Sumatera Utara, (Medan State Court and North Sumatra High Court)	Raad van Justitie	1915	J. van Hoytema, S. Snuyf	3°35′16″N 98°40′21″E		
Petodjo Ice Factory (demolished, on its site stands commercial complex Medan Bisnis Center)	N.V. IJsmaatschappij 'Petodjo'	1920	anonymous	3°35′16″N 98°40′04″E		
Pusat Penelitian Kelapa Sawit Medan, (Medan Oil Palm Research Center)	AVROS-proefstation voor de rubbercultuur te Kampong Baroe	1918	G.H. Mulder	3°33′24″N 98°41′17″E		
Telkom	Telefoondienst van de DSM			3°35′39″N 98°40′46″E		

=== Modernism (1920s-1940s) ===
This period saw the emergence of Modernism and its varieties, namely Art Deco, Nieuwe Bouwen, Amsterdam School and other variations. Art Deco evolved from earlier Dutch Rationalism. The form is symmetrical and exudes technological progress and glamour, with rich colors and bold geometric shapes.

In the following period between the late 1930s and 1940s, Art Deco evolved into a new style known as Nieuwe Bouwen (the Dutch term for Modernism) or Functionalism. Instead of creating decorative styles on the facade, the architect creates style in the clear arrangement of space. These Nieuwe Bouwen buildings were less symmetrical and more expressive in form, using simple universal form such as cylinders or tubes, apparent in buildings such as the de Rex cinema building, now the Ria Restaurant (which was clumsily restored as an Art Deco style building) and the new building of the Medan railway station. Architect J.M. Groenewegen has made his mark on many of Medan's Nieuwe Bouwen buildings.

Medan also became the ground for the implementation of Amsterdam School-styled buildings not found in many parts of Indonesia. The St. Elizabeth's hospital (1929) by J.M. Groenewegen and the original plan of Centrale Pasar (destroyed in a fire) show the influence of the Amsterdam School. The book "Indische Bouwkunst" lists more than 2,000 projects built between 1900 and 1958 - many of which in Medan- as well as over 150 architects who designed them. This book has been translated into Bahasa Indonesia and is available as a free download.

Last official name	Former names	Year	Architect	Location	Latest image	Oldest image
	Gemeentelijke Vismarkt					
	Toko Tjong A Fie, Stork	1919	G.Th. Ubink	3°35′16″N 98°40′43″E		
Bank BNI Kesawan	Chartered Bank of India, China and Australia			3°35′12″N 98°40′45″E		
Bank Danamon Kesawan	Bank of China 中国银行	1930		3°35′12″N 98°40′45″E		
Bank Mandiri	Nederlandsch-Indische Escompto Maatschappij	1927	Th. Taen, Fermont-Cuypers.	3°35′06″N 98°40′50″E		
Bank Mandiri	Nederlands-Indische Handelsbank (NIH)	1940	C.P. Wolff Schoemaker	3°35′20″N 98°40′41″E		
Bank Mandiri Medan Lapangan Merdeka (1998)	de Factorij, Nederlandse Handel-Maatschappij (1929); Gunseikanbu (Japanese occupation); Bank Exim	1929	J. de Bruijn	3°35′22″N 98°40′40″E		
Bata	Warenhuis Cornfield	1951	H. van den Heuvel, Langereis & Co	3°35′11″N 98°40′45″E		
Pusat Pasar	Centrale Pasar 大巴刹 Toa Pa Sat		J.H. Valk	3°35′25″N 98°41′09″E		
Dinas Kebudayaan dan Pariwisata, (Department of Culture and Tourism) (deteriorating as of 2016)	Boekhandel en Drukkerij Varekamp & Co. (Varekamp Bookstore and Printing Co.), Drukkerij J. Hallermann	1921	W. Broekema, J. Mijs, Langereis & Co	3°35′06″N 98°40′50″E		
Gereja Bala Keselamatan, (The Salvation Army)	Weeshuis Leger des Heils; internment camp	Jan 18, 1937		3°34′26″N 98°40′50″E		
Immanuel Church	Nederlandse Hervormde Kerk	1921	Willem Kuijper	3°34′51″N 98°40′23″E		
HKBP Uskup Agung	Batak Protestantschekerk	25 September 1927 (first stone laid)	H. van den Heuvel, Langereis & Co.	3°34′37″N 98°40′16″E		
Katedral Medan, (Medan Cathedral)	Rooms-Katholieke Kerk, (Roman Catholic Church)	January 30, 1928	W. Jaski (1904) J.M. Groenewegen (expansion in 1928)	3°35′03″N 98°40′53″E		
Kesawan 34 (facade modified with pseudo-classical ornament)		First half of 20th-century		3°35′17″N 98°40′42″E		
Museum Perjuangan TNI	Arnhemse Levensverzekeringsmaatschappij, (Arnhem Insurance)	1930	J.M. Groenewegen	3°35′02″N 98°40′27″E		
Oranjeschool (demolished, now Kampus I STTH)	Oranjeschool	1941	J.M. Groenewegen	3°34′36″N 98°40′40″E		
Paradiso Swimming Pool	Zwembad Medan, Zwembad Djalan Radja, Zwembad van de Medansche Zwemvereeniging	1939	J.M. Groenewegen	3°34′48″N 98°41′06″E		
PD Pasar	de Rotonde; Djawatan Penerangan Propinsi Sumatera Utara (1950s)			3°35′27″N 98°41′05″E		
Perguruan Kristen Immanuel, (Immanuel Christian School)	Prinses Beatrix school	1938	J.M. Groenewegen	3°34′41″N 98°40′34″E		
Perusahaan Listrik Negara, Medan	Nederlandsch Indische Gasmaatschappij (NIGM)	1923	J. Mijs, Langereis & Co.	3°35′09″N 98°40′34″E		
PT Perkebunan Nusantara IV	Handelsvereniging 'Amsterdam' (HVA)	1924	Eduard Cuypers	3°34′49″N 98°40′47″E		
Restoran Ria (clumsily restored)	Rex cinema	1938	G. van Wezel (1908-1981)	3°35′08″N 98°40′58″E		
Restoran Tiptop		1934		3°35′09″N 98°40′47″E		
Rumah Dinas Gubernur Sumatera Utara, "North Sumatra Governor's Residence"	Woning van 'eilandgewest' Sumatra (1939); Ambtswoning van de gouverneur van de Oostkust van Sumatra (1948)	1939		3°34′28″N 98°40′10″E		
Rumah Sakit Militer Putri Hijau, (Putri Hijau Military Hospital)	Kantoor van Deli Planters Vereeniging en Immigranten Bureau	1920s?		3°35′59″N 98°40′22″E		
Rumah Sakit Santa Elisabeth, (St. Elisabeth's Hospital)	Sint-Elisabeth Ziekenhuis	1929-1930	J.M. Groenewegen	3°34′31″N 98°40′36″E		
Rumah Sakit Umum Daerah Dr. Pirngadi (Dr. Pirngadi Regional General Hospital)	Gemeente Ziekenhuis, (Municipal Hospital); Syuritsu Byusono Ince	August 11, 1928	J.H. Valk	3°35′51″N 98°41′17″E		
Sutomo School	Su Tung School 蘇東中學	1926	anonymous	3°35′30″N 98°41′13″E		
SMPN 1 Medan, (Medan junior high school 1) (demolished)	Gouvernements Muloschool Medan	Early 1920s	anonymous	3°34′53″N 98°40′28″E		
Stasiun Kereta Api Medan, (Medan Railway Station)	Station, Medan Station	1937		3°35′27″N 98°40′47″E		
Taman Sri Deli	Derikanpark	1931-1932		3°34′35″N 98°41′12″E		

== See also ==
- Colonial architecture of Indonesia
- Cultural heritage
- History of Indonesia

== Cited works ==
- AT; M; MR (28 October 2012). "Walaupun Film Porno Ditayangkan, Bioskop di Medan Tetap Gulung Tikar" [Despite The Screening of Adult Movies, Medan's Cinemas Are Still Closing]. The Aceh Traffic (in Indonesian). Aceh. Archived from the original on 16 March 2016.
- Dick, Howard W. (2002). The Emergence of a National Economy: An Economic History of Indonesia, 1800-2000. Hawaii: University of Hawaii Press. ISBN 9780824825522. Archived from the original on 23 July 2016.
- Gunawan Tjahjono, ed. (1998). Architecture. Indonesian Heritage. Vol. 6. Singapore: Archipelago Press. ISBN 981-3018-30-5.
- Het Indische bouwen: architectuur en stedebouw in Indonesie : Dutch and Indisch architecture 1800-1950. Helmond: Gemeentemuseum Helmond. 1990. Archived from the original on 7 August 2023.
- Janssen, Peter (1 April 2015). "Battle to preserve North Sumatra's smoking past". Nikkei Asian Review. Archived from the original on 5 March 2016.
- Leushuis, Emile (2011). Gids historische stadswandelingen Indonesië [Guide historic city tours Indonesia] (in Dutch). Amsterdam: KIT Publishers. ISBN 9789460221620. Archived from the original on 7 March 2016.
- Loderichs, M.A. (November 1997). Medan - Beeld van een stad [Medan - Pictures of a city] (in Dutch). Purmerend: Asia Maior. ISBN 9074861105.
- "Medan loses its historical buildings". The Jakarta Post. Jakarta. 5 June 2002. Archived from the original on 5 March 2016.
- Thamrin, Mahandis Y. (19 August 2013). "Kisah di Balik Kubah Megah AVROS Medan" [Story behind the majestic dome of AVROS, Medan]. National Geographic Indonesia (in Indonesian). Archived from the original on 3 March 2016.
- Norbruis, Obbe (2020). Landmarks from a bygone era, Life and work of Ed. Cuypers & Hulswit-Fermont 1897-1927. Volendam: LM Publishers. ISBN 9789460220128.
- Norbruis, Obbe (2020). Architecture from the Indonesian Past, Life and work of Fermont-Cuypers 1927-1957. Volendam: LM Publishers. ISBN 9789460220159.
- Norbruis, Obbe (2021). Indische Bouwkunst, architecten en hun oeuvre in Nederlands-Indië en Indonesië in de eerste helft van de 20ste eeuw. Volendam: LM Publishers. ISBN 9789460220296.
- Norbruis, Obbe (2022). Arsitektur di Nusantara. Para Arsitek dan Karya Mereka di Hindia-Belanda dan Indonesia pada Paruh Pertama Abad ke-20. Free download www.heritage-hands-on.org/projects.
- Pugh, P (1990). Great Enterprise A History of Harrisons & Crosfield. London: Harrisons & Crosfield.
- Widodo, Johannes. "Medan: The Advent of a North Sumatran Modern City". Medan Heritage. Sumatra Heritage Trust. Archived from the original on 24 December 2015.
