= Kesawan =

- District

local transcription(s)
  - Simplified: 柯萨婉
  - Traditional: 柯薩婉
  - Pinyin: Kē sà wǎn
  - Pe̍h-ōe-jī: Kho-sat-óan
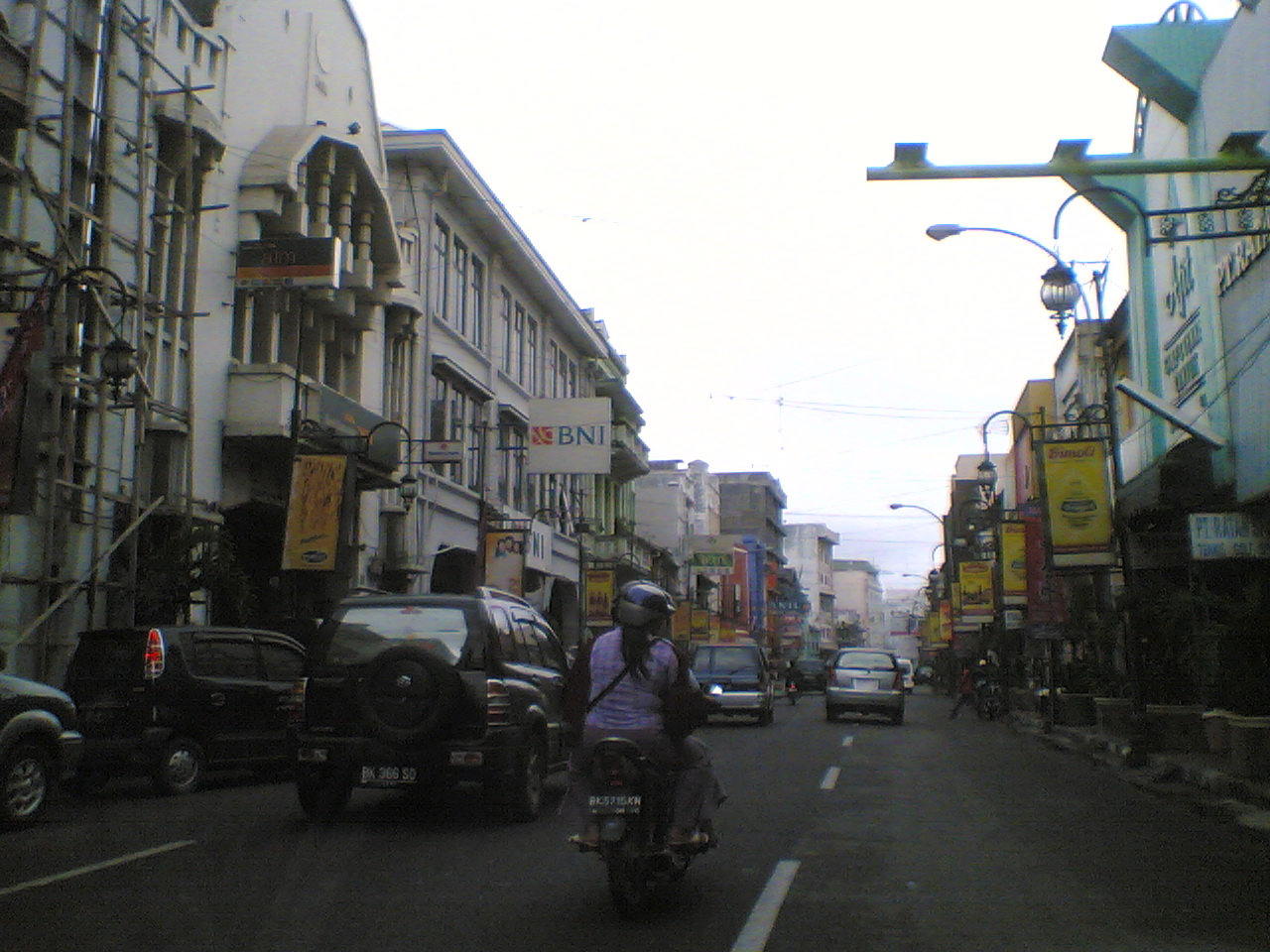
- Kesawan Street, Medan
- Interactive map of Kesawan
- Country: Indonesia
- Province: North Sumatra
- City: Medan

Kesawan is a district (kelurahan) in West Medan, Medan, Indonesia. This region is filled with historic buildings along Jalan Ahmad Yani (Kesawan Street), the oldest street in Medan, the majority of Kesawan's residents are ethnic Chinese and Deli Malays.

== Notable buildings nearby ==
- Deli Park Podomoro City Medan
- Nederlandsch Indische Escompto Maatschappij Office
- Medan Station
- Graha Merah Putih Building
- South East Asia Bank Building
- Tjong A Fie Mansion
- Tip Top Cafe
- TVRI North Sumatra building
- Capital Building
- AVROS Office Building
- London Sumatra Building
- Bank Indonesia Office Building
- Bank Rakyat Indonesia Headquarters
- Medan Culture and Tourism Office Building
- Warenhuis Building/AMPI Building
- Deli Tobacco Hospital
- Medan City Hall
- Medan Post Office
- Titi Gantung Bridge
- Bank Modern Building
- Analisa Daily Building (Analisa Daily/Hao Bao Daily)
- Hotel JW Marriott Medan
- Jakarta Lloyd Building
- Inna Dharma Deli Hotel
- Merdeka Walk Hawker Centre

== Gallery ==
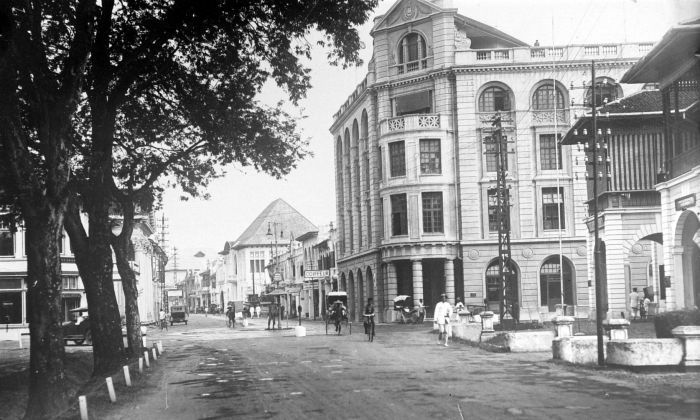
Van Harrison Office Building (now Lonsum Building) and left: Esplanade (now Merdeka Square)

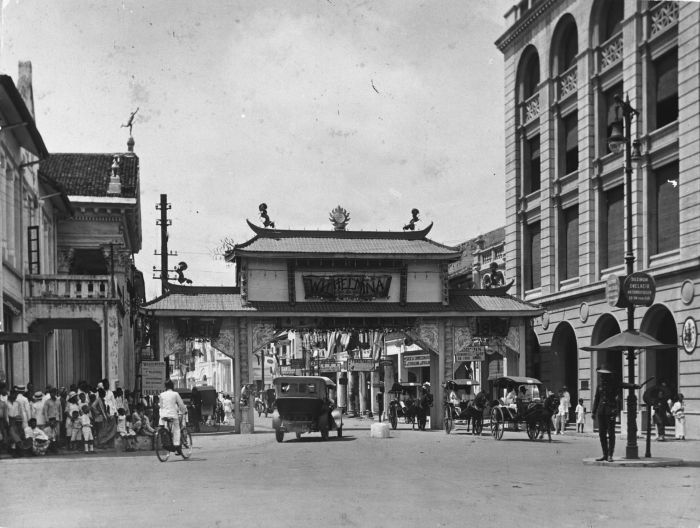
A paifang at Kesawan

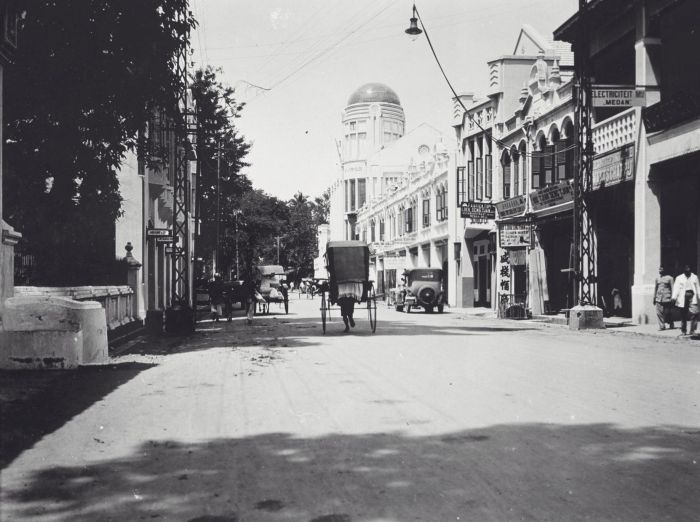
Unlike most cities in Colonial Indonesia, most buildings in Kesawan shows the influence of British tropical architecture that is commonly found within the Straits Settlements

== See also ==
- Chinatowns in Asia
- Glodok, historical Chinatown in Jakarta
