= West Medan =

Administrative district on Sumatra, Indonesia

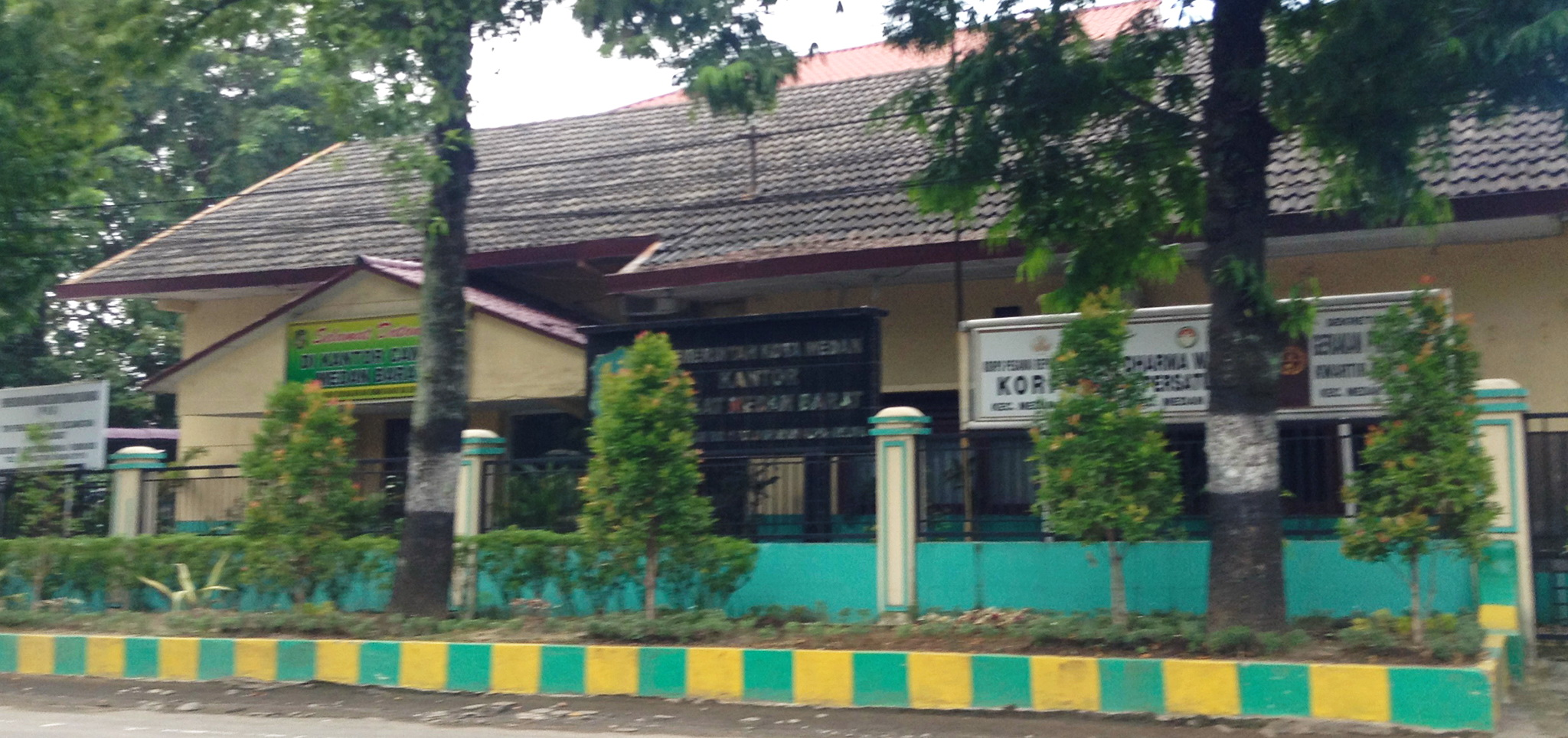
West Medan District Office

West Medan, (Indonesian: Medan Barat) is one of 21 administrative districts (kecamatan) in the city of Medan, North Sumatra, Indonesia.

The boundaries of the district:

- To the north : Medan Deli
- To the south : Medan Petisah, Medan Maimun
- To the east : East Medan
- To the west : Medan Helvetia, Medan Petisah

At the 2010 census, it had a population of 70,771 inhabitants. Total area is 6.14 km^{2} and the population density in 2010 was 11,526 inhabitants/km^{2}.

== Residents ==
The majority of this district population is Chinese, Malay, Batak, Indian, Javanese and Minangkabau.

== Interesting Place ==
- Kesawan
- Tjong A Fie Mansion
- Medan City Hall
