= Medan Post Office =

Building in Medan, Indonesia

Coordinates: 3.591938257146494°N 98.67742761892171°E

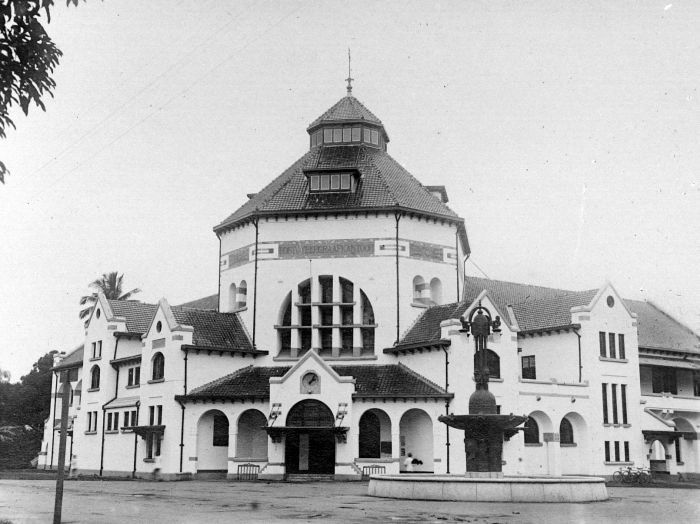
Medan Post and Telegraph Office and the Nienhuys fountain in the Dutch colonial era

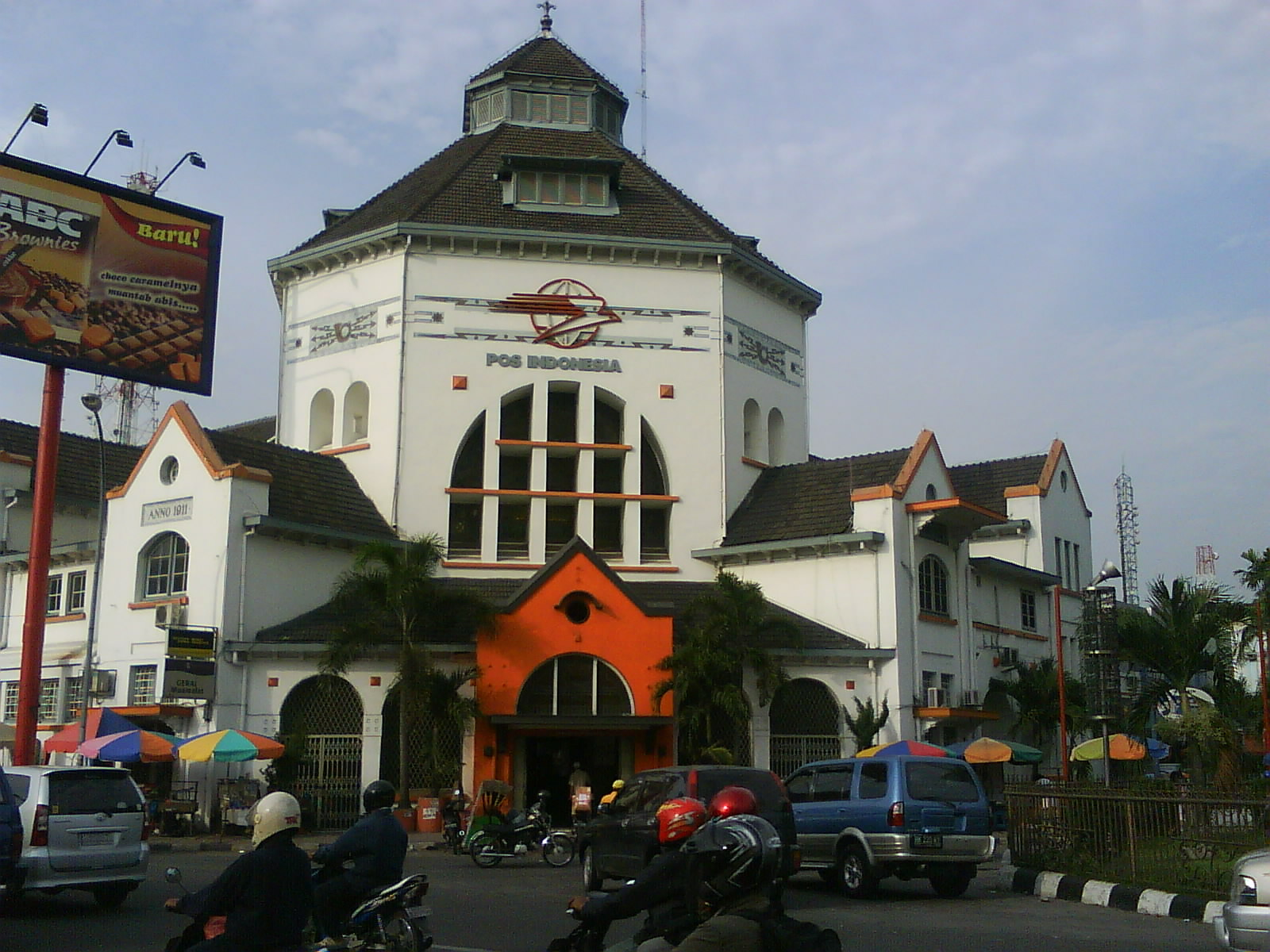
Medan Post and Telegraph Office in 2014

The Medan Post and Telegraph Office (Indonesian: Kantor Pos Medan) is a historic building in Medan, Indonesia. It was designed by Ir. S. Snuyf from Burgelijke Openbare Werken (BOW) and opened in 1911. Located in downtown Medan, several other important colonial era buildings are located nearby including Old City Hall Medan, Inna Dharma Deli Hotel, Grand Mosque, Maimoon Palace, Immanuel Church, Tjong A Fie Mansion and Sri Mariamman Temple. The post office remains in operation and includes a stamp collection exhibit. Snuyf also designed Palembang City Hall (built 1928–1931). A fountain in front of the post office was a tribute to Jacob Nienhuys. This office now serves as Pos Bloc Medan, a modernized version of the place that features some cafés, restaurants, and some shops, with some areas showing a small exhibition of old tools and items used during its operation as a post office.

== See also ==
- List of colonial buildings in Medan
