= Lim Hooi Seong =

Chinese anthropologist and archaeologist

- 林惠祥
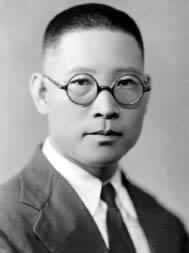
- Lim Hooi Seong, 1939
- Pronunciation: Línhuìxiáng
- Born: May 3, 1901; Jinjiang, Fujian, Qing Dynasty
- Died: February 13, 1958 (aged 56); Xiamen, Fujian, People's Republic of China
- Resting place: Xiamen University, Xiamen, Fujian, People's Republic of China; 24.4465531°N 118.1001058°E
- Other names: Lin Shiren (pseudonym); Thomas Huisiang Lim; Lim Hooi Seong
- Education: Xiamen University (1923–1926); University of the Philippines (1927–1928)
- Occupations: Scholar, anthropologist
- Years active: 1919–1958
- Employer(s): Xiamen University (1926–1927, 1928, 1930–1935, 1947–1958); Academia Sinica (1928–1930, 1935–1937); Nanyang Girls' High School (1938–1939); Chung Ling High School (1939–1941)
- Known for: Anthropology
- Notable work: On Han Xin (1919); The Primitive Cultures of the Taiwanese Indigenous People (1930); The Encyclopaedia of World Ethnography (1934); Folklore Studies (1934); Cultural Anthropology (1934); On Mythology (1934); Chinese Ethnohistory (1936)
- Political party: Chinese Communist Party (1957–1958)
- Spouse: Huang Ruixia (d. 1941)
- Children: 2

Lim Hooi Seong (1 June 1901 – 13 February 1958) was a Chinese anthropologist and archaeologist who contributed significantly to the development of the studies of anthropology and ethnology in China. An expert in ethnic research, he was involved in the Academia Sinica during its founding and conducted studies on Taiwanese indigenous peoples and Malays throughout the 1930s. He was also an early alumnus of Xiamen University, being one of its earliest academicians, and founded the Museum of Anthropology of Xiamen University, the first anthropological museum in China.

During the Second Sino-Japanese War, he fled to the Straits Settlements and became the provost of Chung Ling High School, Malaya's premier Chinese high school. In his later life, he became a politician associated with the Chinese Communist Party (CCP), becoming a member of the National People's Congress.

== Biography ==
=== Genealogy ===
Lim Hooi Seong's great-grandfather, Lin Gongzhan (1792–1873) was a jinshi recipient. His grandfather, Lin Xinyu (1844–1870), along with his brother and family immigrated to Lukang. The Lin family was involved in commerce in Taiwan and had amassed a significant fortune. However, after his early passing, the family business declined, and his wife became a single parent, taking care of his two sons, including Lin's father, Lin Mingfang (1869–1929). After the First Sino-Japanese War, Taiwan was ceded to Japanese rule in 1895, hence Lin Mingfang became a Japanese citizen.

=== Early life ===
Lim Hooi Seong was born in Jinjiang, Fujian on 3 May 1901. The second son of Lin Mingfang, his birth brought excitement to his father due to the early death of his first son. As mastering the Japanese language was a requirement for merchants in Taiwan at the time, he was admitted into the Dongying Academy, a Japanese school in Fuzhou. He was noted as a brilliant student, graduating first among his class; and was an avid reader of classical novels, later recalling that it "significantly improved [my] mastery in Chinese". He was well-liked by his headmaster, Hiroyuki Yokoo, and was recommended by him to work as a merchant in Japan, but turned down the advice.

Lin became friends with a classmate who was proficient in Classical Chinese and was motivated to study ancient Chinese texts and English, eventually succeeding in enrolling himself in an English high school managed by the YMCA. After attending a semester in the school, he was one of the top students of his year but felt progress was too slow. Suffering from financial difficulties from his father's struggling business, he decided to withdraw from school and started self-studying. This decision brought his father disappointment. Afterwards, Yokoo approached him and recommended he become a Chinese teacher at his alma mater, and tried to persuade him to further his studies in Japan through funding from the Lin Ben Yuan family. However, Lin turned down all of Yokoo's invitations. Soon after his father's business failed he returned to Taiwan and became an accountant for a local businessman.

In 1919, while at Fuzhou, he wrote his first historical thesis, On Han Xin (Chinese: 韓信論). Published in the 8th issue of the Taiwan Literary Magazine (Chinese: 台湾文艺丛志) as the winning essay of the magazine's essay competition, he took pride in the achievement.

=== Education in Xiamen and the Philippines ===
In 1920, under the advice of his younger cousin, who was residing in the Philippines, he moved to Manila. In Manila, he worked as a secretary in a rice factory owned by his distant relatives. During his spare time, he self-studied sociology. A year later, upon knowing that the newly established Xiamen University (then University), founded by Tan Kah Kee, was accepting students free of charge, he left Manila for Xiamen. Due to his late return, however, he could not participate in the university's entrance exam, thus he remained a spectator during lectures. In 1923, he was formally accepted into the university's sociology department. While continuing his studies, he was awarded the university's premier scholarship twice and was employed as a high school history teacher. He eventually graduated in 1926, becoming the only graduate of his department that year.

After his graduation, he stayed at Xiamen University and became a lecturer. In 1927, he resigned from his position amidst controversies related to Lu Xun's dismissal from the university,[1] and returned to the Philippines to study anthropology at the University of the Philippines, under the guidance of H. Otley Beyer. He graduated prematurely from his studies in 1928 to return to China and was hired as an academician at Xiamen University once more. He later became a researcher in anthropological studies of the Academia Sinica in Nanking.

=== Studies on the Taiwanese indigenous people ===
In 1929, Lin Mingfang died in Taipei. Cai Yuanpei, the founding president of Academia Sinica and head of its anthropological department, instructed Lin to conduct a study on the Taiwanese indigenous peoples during his return to Taiwan for his father's funeral. Bearing a Chinese passport, Lin travelled under the pseudonym Lin Shiren, and assumed the identity as a merchant, reaching Taipei in July 1929. In Taipei, he conducted surveys on the Atayal people and investigated the Yuanshan archaeological site near Zhongshan District. On 23 August, he embarked on Taitō Prefecture (present-day Taitung County) to survey the Puyuma and the Amis people, before arriving at Karenkō Prefecture (present-day Hualien County) for a separate study on the Atayal people. On 14 September, he reached Ershui in Shōkagun County (present-day Changhua County) to establish contacts with the Thao people.

Lin returned to Shanghai in 1930 and published The Primitive Cultures of the Taiwanese Indigenous People (Chinese: 台湾蕃族之原始文化), the first comprehensive Chinese publication related to the Taiwanese indigenous people. He left the Academia Sinica shortly after due to feuds with other researchers and returned to Xiamen University as a professor of sociology and anthropology, and the university's dean of historical sociology. In 1935, the Academia Sinica Institute of History and Philology moved its operations from Canton to Peking. The institute's creation of an anthropological department enticed Lin to return to Academia Sinica as a researcher. In 1937, he launched his archaeological survey in western Fujian, discovering new historic sites from the Neolithic era.

=== At the Straits Settlements ===
The outbreak of the Second Sino-Japanese War in 1937 threatened the safety of Lin and his family. He initially moved to the Kulangsu International Settlement along with his family and his collection of anthropological artefacts. Fearing Xiamen's impending destruction in the war, his family fled to British Hong Kong. In early-January 1938, Lin traveled to British Singapore to attend the Third International Far Eastern Archaeological Convention (Chinese: 第三届远东史前学国际大会). Upon his arrival, he was approached by Sutomo School in Medan which was interested in hiring him, but he refused the request due to his desire to further his research in Singapore.

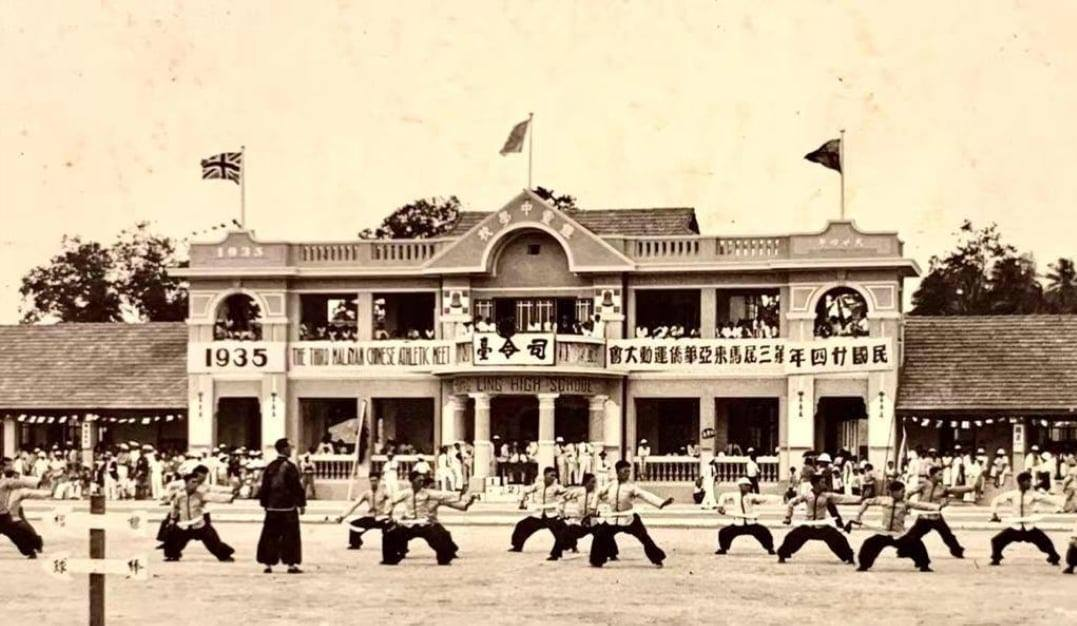
Chung Ling High School, 1935.

Afterwards, he was employed as a teacher at the Nanyang Girls' High School, prompting his family to settle in Singapore. However, the salary he received in Singapore was only a quarter of what he earned in Xiamen, forcing him to start selling manuscripts to maintain his financial status. In 1939, he transferred to Chung Ling High School in George Town as the school's provost. In the same year, representing the high school, he launched a donation campaign aimed to donate winter clothing to frontline soldiers in China, receiving support from Xu Beihong.

In March 1941, Lin was sacked as provost of the school. He later believed it was due to the acknowledgement of Tan Kah Kee as a sympathiser of the Chinese Communist Party (CCP) in 1940, which led to a tenuous relationship between Malayan divisions of the CCP and the Kuomintang (KMT), causing the outbreak of anti-Tan demonstrations held by Malayan KMT divisions. Lin, who was closely affiliated with Xiamen University, was assumed by the high school's pro-KMT school administrators as a communist sympathizer and was hastily fired from his position. His daughter Lin Huaming attributed the incident to his father's refusal of expelling pro-communist students from the high school, leading to his dismissal by the pro-KMT school administrators.

After the sacking, he returned to Singapore and presided over the death of his wife and son from starvation later that year. In February 1942, Singapore fell under Japanese rule. He was offered by the Japanese occupation government to work as a linguist, but he refused any association with the Japanese. He moved to the Malay Peninsula and went incognito for three years as a farmer.

=== Post-war and death ===
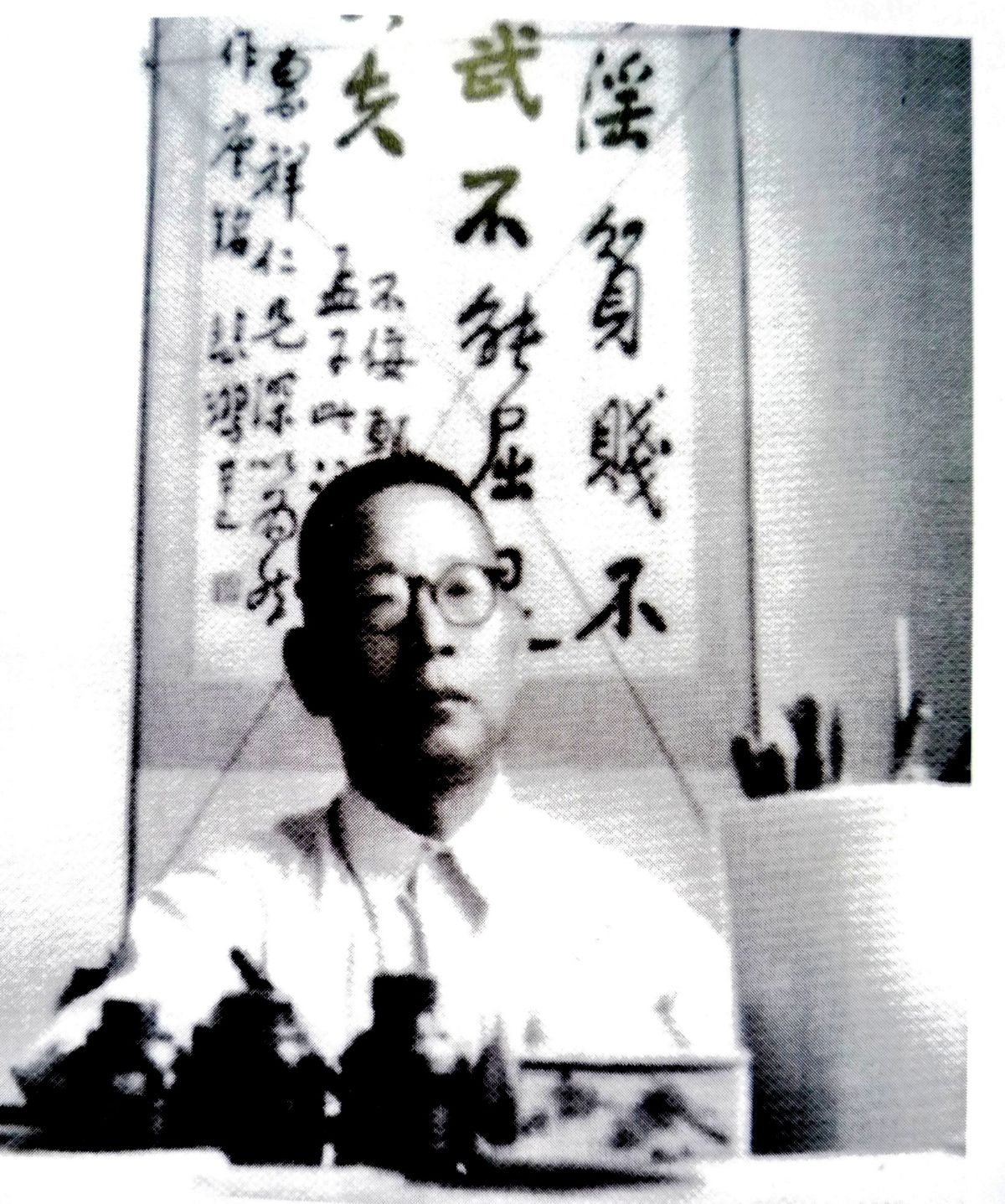
Lim Hooi Seong, 1953.

After the end of the war in 1945, Lin became Tan Kah Kee's secretary. He was involved in the editorials of Tan's several publications, including Memoirs of a Straits' Chinese (Chinese: 南侨回忆录, 1946), and The War and the Straits' Chinese (Chinese: 大战与南侨, 1947). He returned to China in 1947 and assumed his previous job as a history professor at Xiamen University. After the resumption of the Second Chinese Civil War, he refused invitations from the KMT to participate in politics, and expressed his students with anti-war thoughts, causing his arrest in 1949 by the KMT government. He was released after Xiamen fell to communist control. In 1951 he suggested the formation of an anthropological museum within Xiamen University and donated his entire book and artefact collections. In 1953, he became the founding director of the Museum of Anthropology of Xiamen University. Four years later, he joined the CCP and was elected as a member of the National People's Congress, representing Xiamen.

Lin died on 13 February 1958, due to a cerebral haemorrhage at the age of 56. He was buried on the campus of Xiamen University.

== Nationality ==
According to Lin's biography, his father, Lin Mingfang, received his Japanese citizenship while living in Taiwan. As Japanese citizenship laws at the time followed the principles of Jus sanguinis, his family became Japanese citizens by default. Despite this, most of the family resided in Quanzhou. As his father did not precisely state his nationality, he attained double citizenship from both Japan and the Qing Dynasty. Furthermore, his father had joined a research institute set up by the Qing Government in Fuzhou, graduating in 1909.

During his time at Xiamen University, the May Fourth Movement influenced him to abandon his Japanese nationality. He opted to apply as a Chinese national, registering as a native of Fujian, but faced difficulties in revoking his Japanese identity, and eventually gave up on changing it. While in the Philippines in 1928, he only referred to himself as a Chinese national and used the name Thomas Huixiang Lim to not reveal his identity. While returning to Taiwan in 1929, he used a Chinese passport. Since then and until his death, Lin refused to recognize his Japanese citizenship and insisted that he was always a Chinese national.

== Legacy ==
Between 1927 and his death in 1958, Lin wrote 18 books and over 70 essays. His works had momentous impacts towards the development of anthropological studies in China. Some of his notable works included The Primitive Cultures of the Taiwanese Indigenous People (1930), The Encyclopaedia of World Ethnography (1934), Folklore Studies (1934), Cultural Anthropology (1934), On Mythology (1934) and Chinese Ethnohistory (1936). He discovered Neolithic sites in Xiamen, participated in the exhumation of a Tang-dynasty tomb in Quanzhou, and directed research efforts towards a Neolithic site in Wuping County. He also discovered prehistoric artefacts in Longyan, Changting County, Jinjiang, and Minhou County, and conducted investigations and studies towards the cultural practices of locals in Xiamen and Hui'an County. During his time in the Straits Settlements, he studied local culture and published several works related to archaeological and cultural studies in the Straits Settlements. He also discovered Paleolithic sites in Malaya.

Taiwanese anthropologist Li Yih-yuan remarked that Lin's biggest contribution towards anthropology was his 1934 work, Wenhua Renleixue (Cultural Anthropology). Since its inception, it became the standard teaching material for anthropological studies in Taiwan and was still commonly used within Taiwanese high schools and universities until the 1980s. The book popularized many modern cultural concepts, such as feminism. His 1930 work, Taiwanfanzhuzhi Yuanshiwenhua (The Primitive Cultures of the Taiwanese Indigenous People) became the precedent of modern Chinese studies towards the Taiwanese indigenous people. He proposed similarities between the Baiyue and the Malays, now classified under the Austronesian peoples, and hypothesized that the Austronesians originated from South China and northern-Mainland Southeast Asia. Besides, his archaeological studies contributed greatly to the knowledge of prehistoric archaeology in South China, Taiwan and Malaysia. His academic work at Xiamen University laid the foundations for the creation of the institution's anthropological department in 1984.

Lin called for the integration of several fields in humanities towards the study of history, combining techniques used within historical studies to conduct anthropological research. He was the first Chinese anthropologist to classify Chinese ethnicities into historical and modern classifications. Li Yih-yuan assessed Lin's Zhongguo Minzushi (Chinese Ethnohistory) and concluded that the work fused both historical elements and modern ethnic concepts, establishing modern classification methods for Chinese ethnicities.

== See also ==
- Chung Ling High School
- Xiamen University
- Lim Boon Keng
- Lin Yutang
