= Governor's house in Medan =

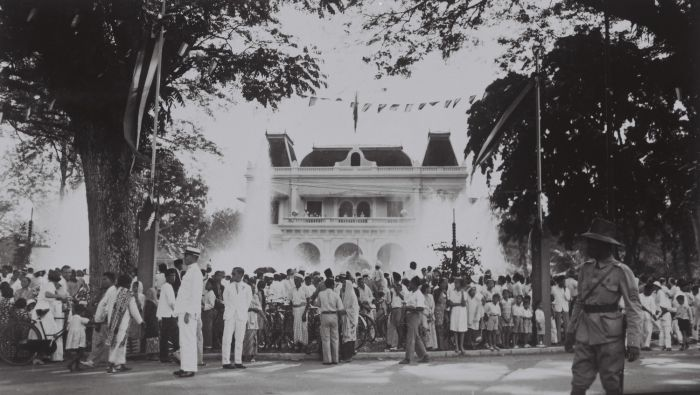
The governor's house in Medan as a crowd gather to celebrate the marriage of Princess Juliana and Prince Bernhard (1937)

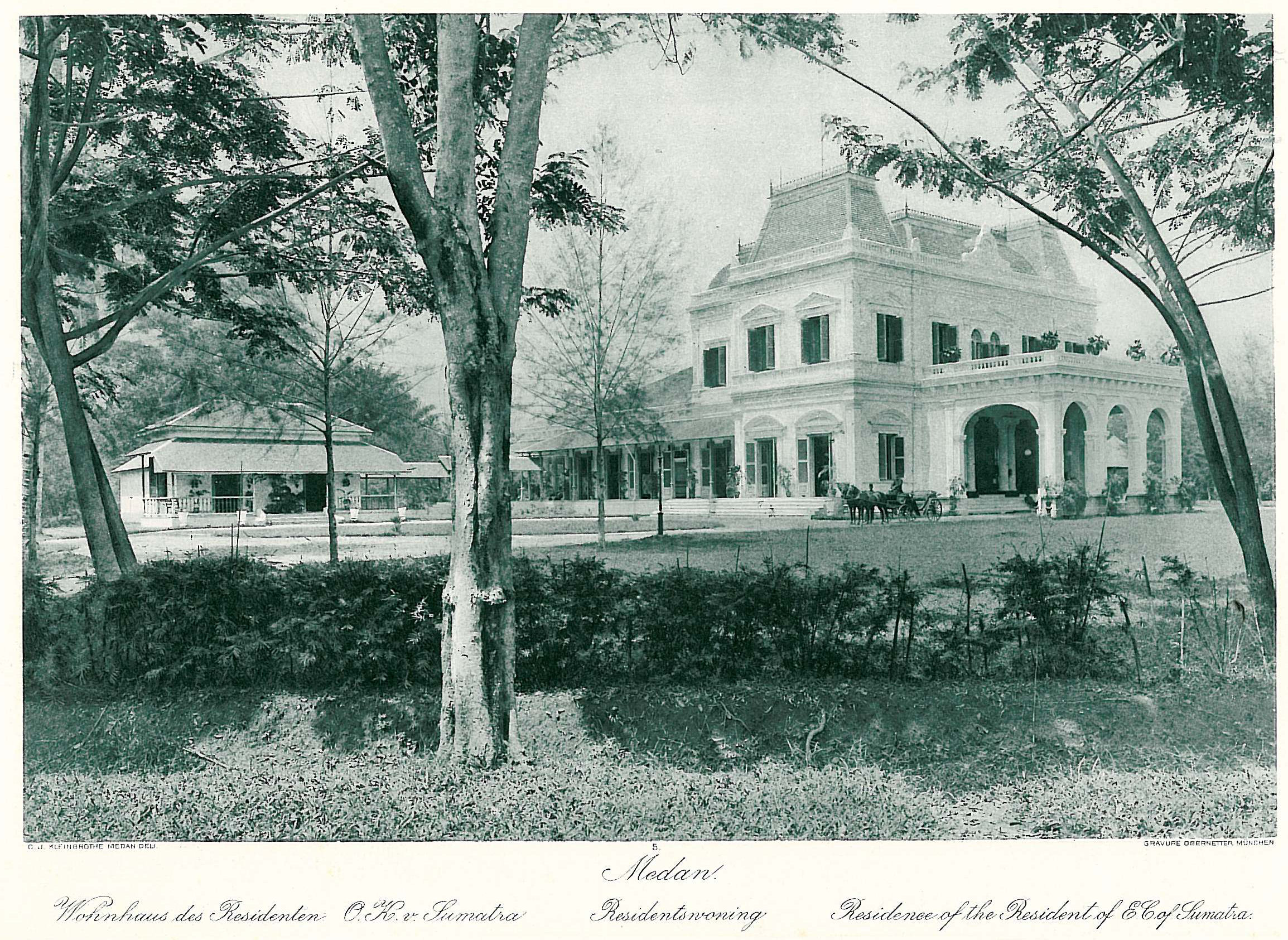
Postcard of the resident's house (governor's) of East Sumatra

The old Governor's house in Medan is a historic mansion that was used by the resident during the Dutch East Indies and remains an example of colonial architecture in Medan, East Sumatra, Indonesia.

The building is currently used as the Medan branch office of the Standard Chartered Bank and is within the grounds of Hotel Danau Toba.

== Gallery ==
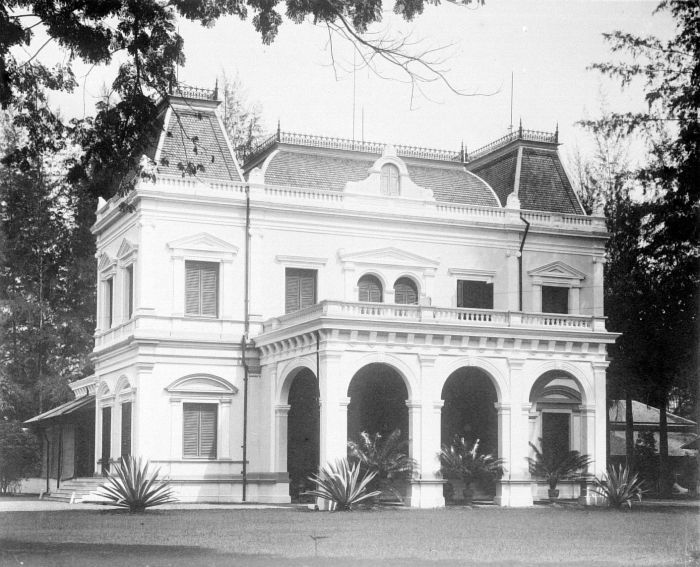

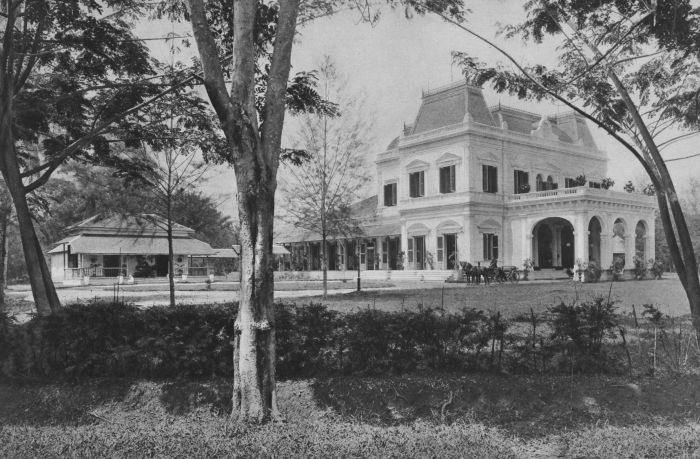

== See also ==
- Colonial architecture of Medan
- Medan Club
