= Kampung Madras =

- Ethnic enclave

Other transcription(s)
  - Tamil: மதராஸ் கிராமம் Matarās kirāmam
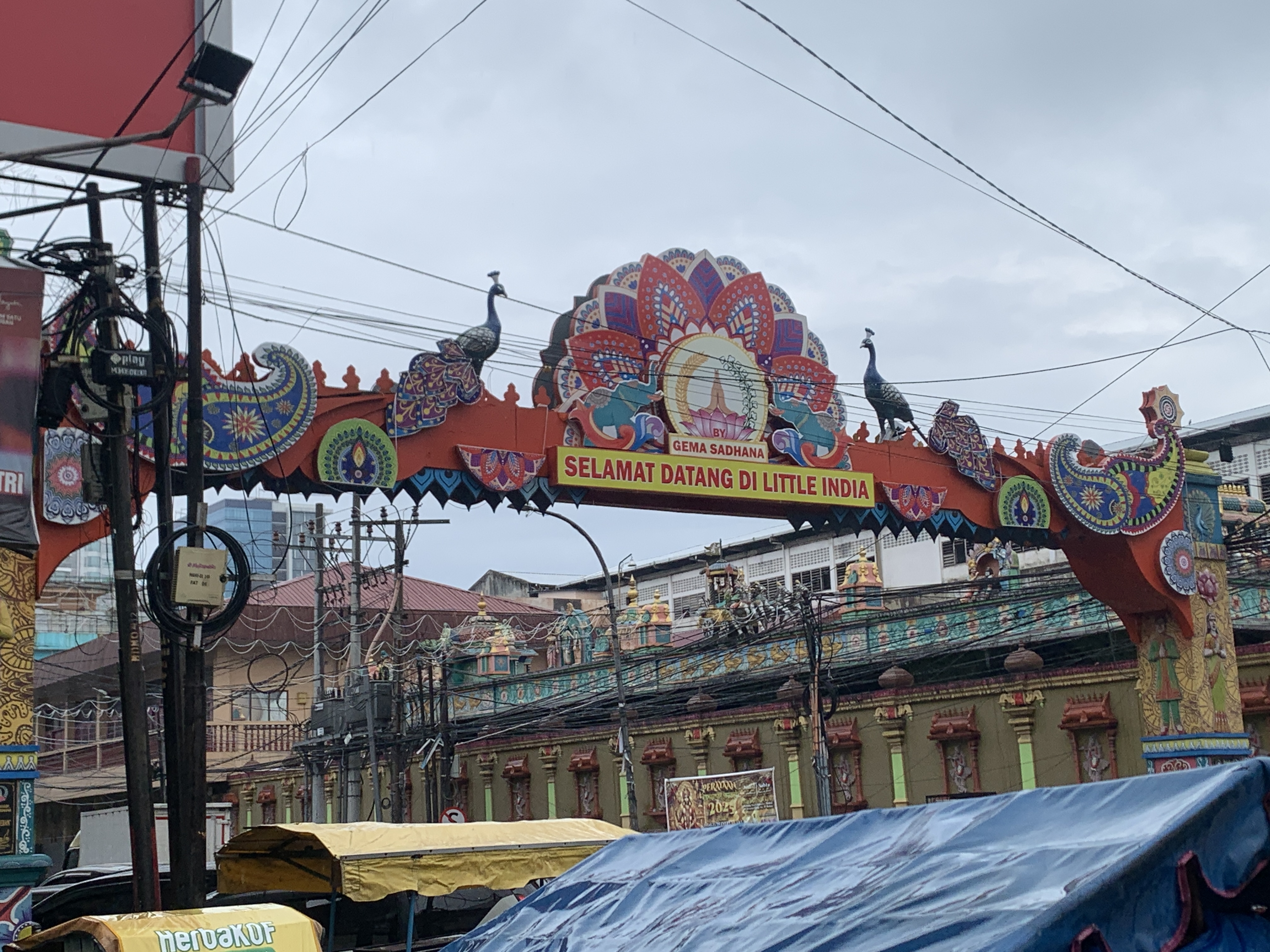
- Main gate (gopuram) of Kampung Madras or Little India of Medan
- Country: Indonesia
- Province: North Sumatra
- City: Medan

Kampung Madras (Madras Village), formerly known as Kampung Keling (Tamil: காலிங் கிராமம்), is the Little India of Medan, Indonesia, and one of the city's significant ethnic enclaves. Kampung Madras encompasses an area of approximately 10 hectares, and hosts a large Indian population, mostly Tamils. Now a now part of the Medan Polonia district, Kampung Madras is home to many sporting goods resellers, sari stores, and other shophouses.

In the mid-nineteenth century, the colonial Dutch began importing Indian labor to work on Sumatran plantations and to construct roads, trenches, and dykes; today, Sumatra is home to as many as 60,000 people of Indian descent, many of whom reside in Medan.

This area was originally called Patisah (Tamil: பெடிசாஹ்), and the name became a district in Medan called Petisah. The enclave's name changed to Kampung Madras to reflect the native land of the people of Indian descent who reside there. However, many people still refer to the place as Kampung Keling, a more derogatory term that may be offensive to some of its residents and others.

Every year, Kampung Madras becomes a meeting point for Hindu and/or Tamil festivals such as Thaipusam, Thai Pongal, and Deepavali.

== Location ==
Kampung Madras is made of a ten acre landscape beginning the edge of Sungai Soekamoelia off Jalan Palang Merah, precisely the corner of Bank Sumut Medan, eclipsing towards Jalan Diponegoro to the East encircling all the way to Jalan Jendral Sudirman Sekolah Immanuel (Formerly Known as Queen Beatrice School) towards Sungai Babura, covering all the areas towards Jalan Cik di Tiro leading to Titi Berlian on the North rounding up all the way to the Chettiar Kovil in Jalan Kebun Bunga.

Shri Mariamman, an historic temples, stand as an icon of Kampung Madras is located along Jalan Zainul Arifin, as well as other Hindu temples the Kaliamman Temple and the Thedayuthabani Chettiar Temple on Jalan Kebun Bunga.

Kampung Madras is home to Hindu religious shrines, as well as four historical mosques: Masjid Agung, Masjid Gaudiah, Masjid South India, and Masjid Al-Madras (Cik di Tiro). It also contains five historical churches: GPIB opposite the governor's office, the Methodist Church at Jalan Hang Tua, GKPS church at Jln. Cik di Tiro, GKI at Jalan Zainul Arifin, and Gereja Baptis at Jalan Diponegoro. Additionally, a Punjabi Gurudwaar and a Buddhist shrine, the Temple of Gunung Timor at Jalan Hang Tuah, are located within the area.

There is also Khalsa Indian school, later changed to be Khalsa National School, that has a long history of producing the most English speakers of the resident of Medan and beyond, precisely located next to the Gurduwara in Kampung Madras.

== Temples ==
Several Hindu temples are located in Kampung Madras:

- Sri Mariamman Temple
- Thandayuthapani Temple
- Sri Kaliamman Temple
- Maha Muniswarar Temple

== Mosques ==
Two mosques serve the enclave: Jami Mosque, built in 1887, and Ghaudiyah Mosque. Both mosques were built by early South Indian Muslims in Medan.

== See also ==
- Pasar Baru, another Little India in Jakarta, Indonesia
