= Medan Polonia =

District in Medan City, North Sumatra Province, Indonesia

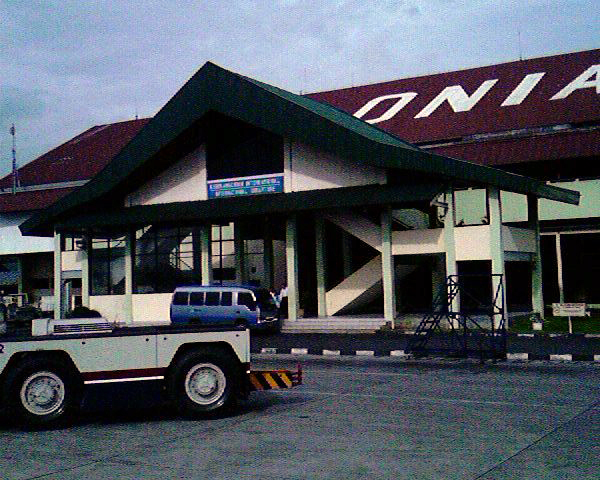
Soewondo Air Base in Medan Polonia

Medan Polonia is one of 21 administrative districts (kecamatan) in the city of Medan, North Sumatra, Indonesia. The old Polonia Airport was located in this district. This area consists of luxury housing and restaurants near the airport, and shops and houses on the north side.

Boundaries of the district (Indonesian: kecamatan):

- To the north : Medan Petisah
- To the south : Medan Johor
- To the east : Medan Maimun
- To the west : Medan Baru

At the 2010 Census, it had a population of 52,794 inhabitants. Total area is 8.74 km^{2} (3.37 sq mi) and the population density in 2010 was 6,040.5/km^{2} (15,645/sq mi).

== Interesting places ==
- Sri Mariamman Temple (ஸ்ரீ மாரியம்மன் கோவில்), Hindu temple
- Kampung Madras (மதராஸ் கிராமம்), Little India
- Sun Plaza, Shopping Mall
- Hermes Place Polonia, Shopping Mall
- Vihara Gunung Timur (東嶽觀), Buddhist temple
- Masjid Agung (مسجد اڬوڠ), Mosque
- Gurdwara Sri Guru Arjun Dev Ji (ਗੁਰਦੁਆਰਾ ਸ੍ਰੀ ਗੁਰੂ ਅਰਜਨ ਦੇਵ ਜੀ), Sikhs Gurdwara
