= Tirtanadi Water Tower =

Water tower in Medan, North Sumatra

- Menara Air Tirtanadi
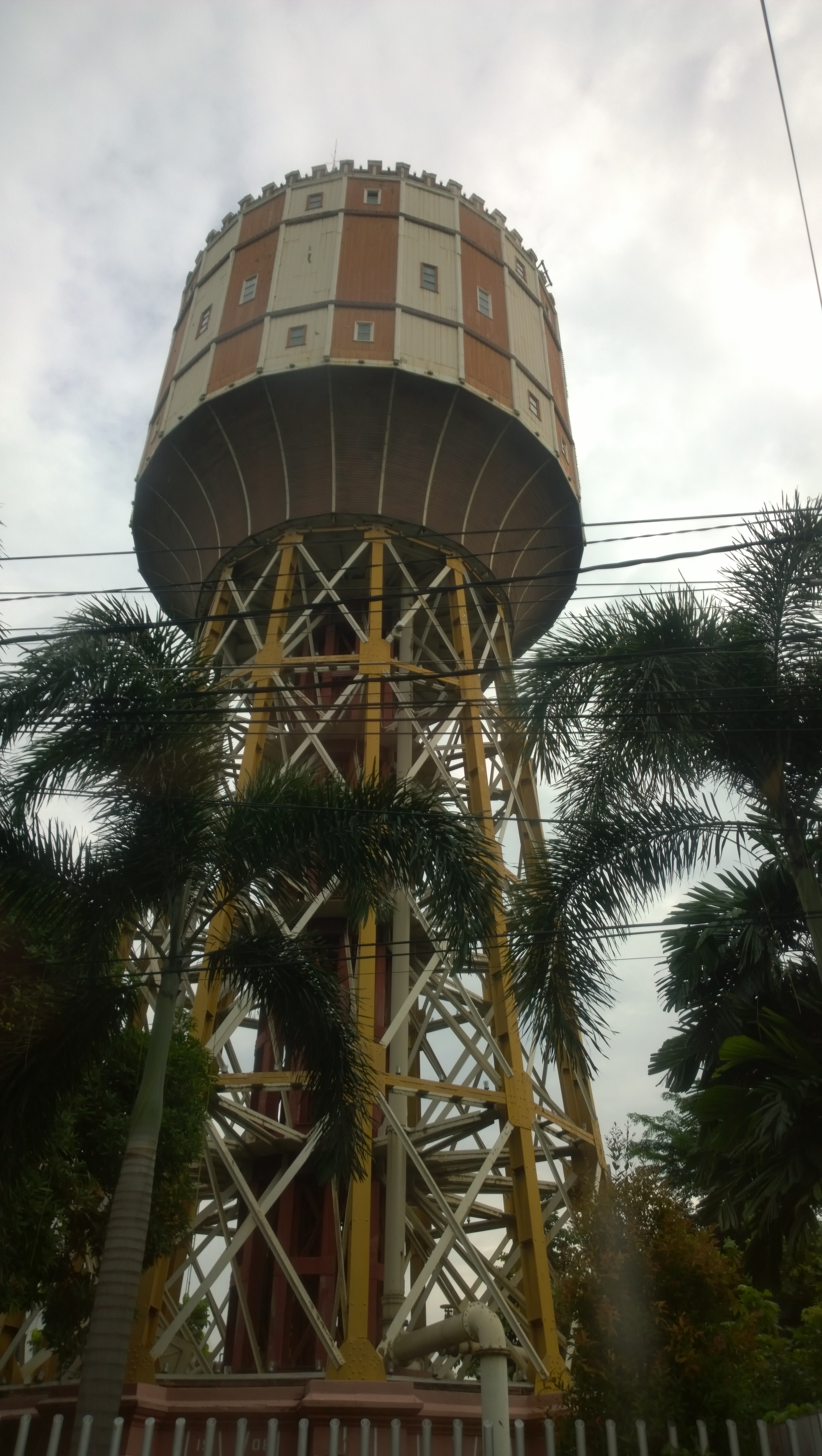

General information
- Location: Medan, Indonesia
- Coordinates: 3°34′55.55″N 98°41′5.98″E
- Completed: 1908

Height
- Roof: 42 metres (138 ft)

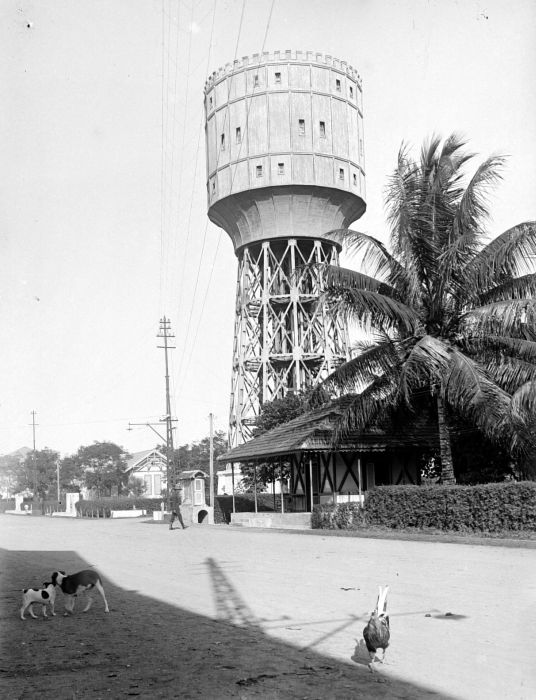
Tower of Tirtanadi in Dutch East Indies era

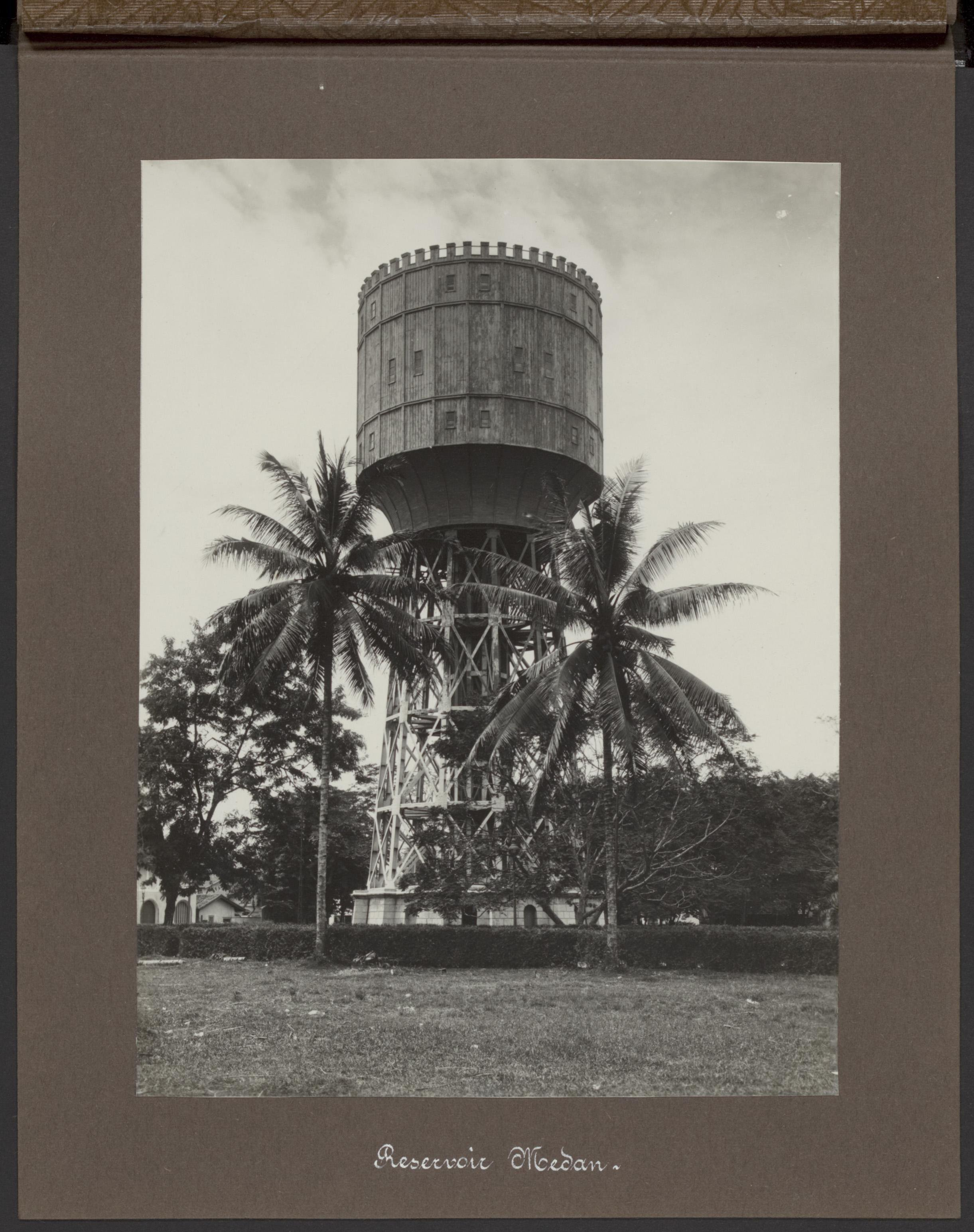
Tirtanadi Water Tower, 1929

The Tirtanadi Water Tower is a water tower dating back to 1908 in city of Medan, North Sumatra, Indonesia. It is operated by a municipally owned water company PDAM Tirtanadi.

The water tower was built in 1908 and owned by NV. Water Leiding Maatschappij Ajer Bersih company, which was established in 1905 and belonged to the Dutch East Indies government.
