= Medan Maimun =

District in Medan City, North Sumatra Province, Indonesia

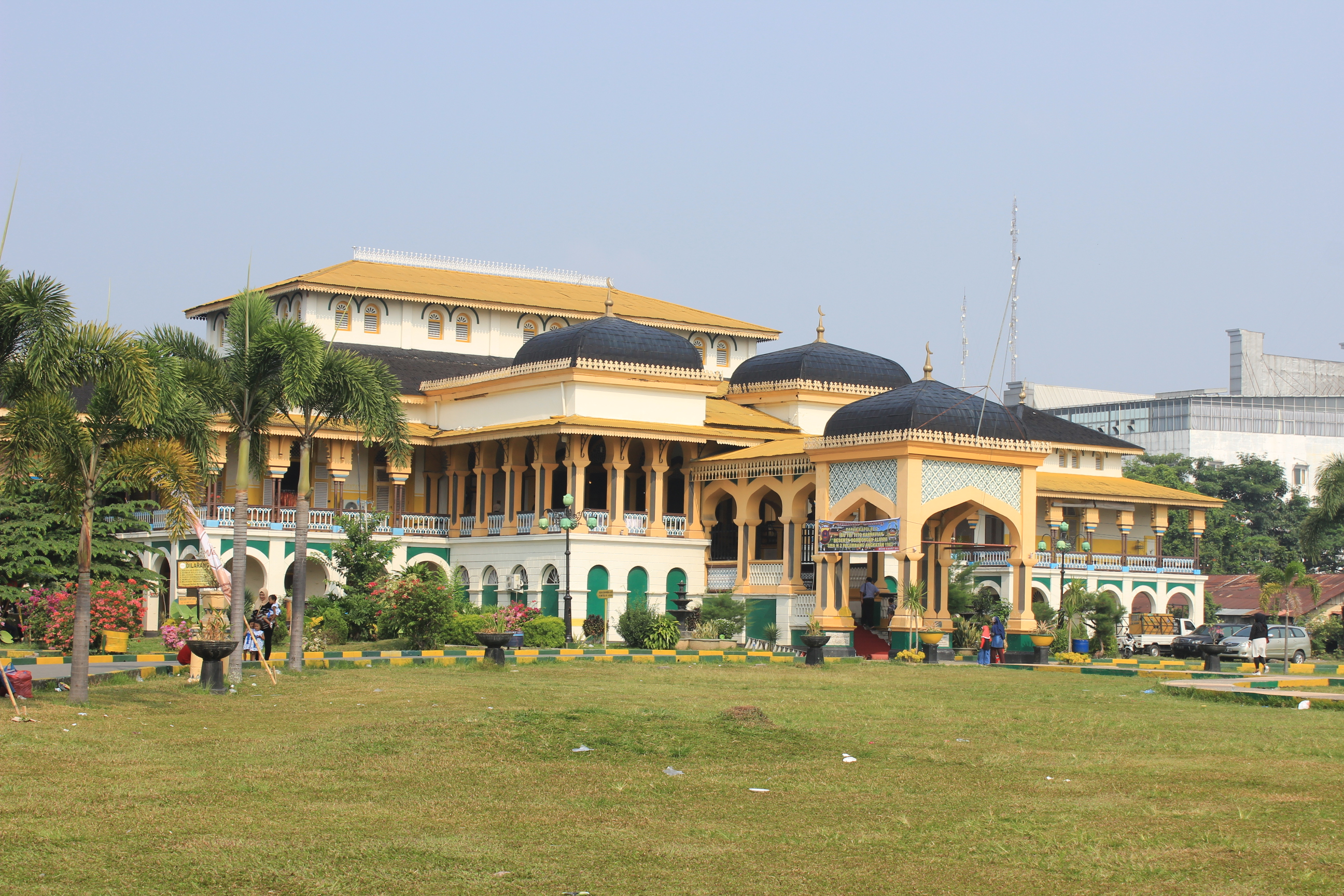
Maimun Palace in Medan Maimun

Medan Maimun (Jawi: ماءيمون; Chinese: 麥蒙; Pe̍h-ōe-jī: be̍h mn̂g) is one of 21 districts in the city of Medan, North Sumatra, Indonesia.

Boundaries of the district (Indonesian: kecamatan):

- To the north: Medan Barat
- To the south: Medan Amplas, Medan Johor
- To the east: Medan Kota
- To the west: Medan Polonia

At the 2010 Census, it had a population of 39,581. The total area is 3.06 square kilometres (1.18 sq mi) and the population density in 2010 was 12,935 per square kilometre (33,500/sq mi).

== Residents ==
The majority of residents of the district are Malays, followed by Chinese, Minangkabau and other ethnic groups.

== See also ==
- Maimoon Palace (ايستان ماءيمون), Palace and landmark of Medan
