= Medan City Hall =

- Balai Kota Lama; Gemeentehuis

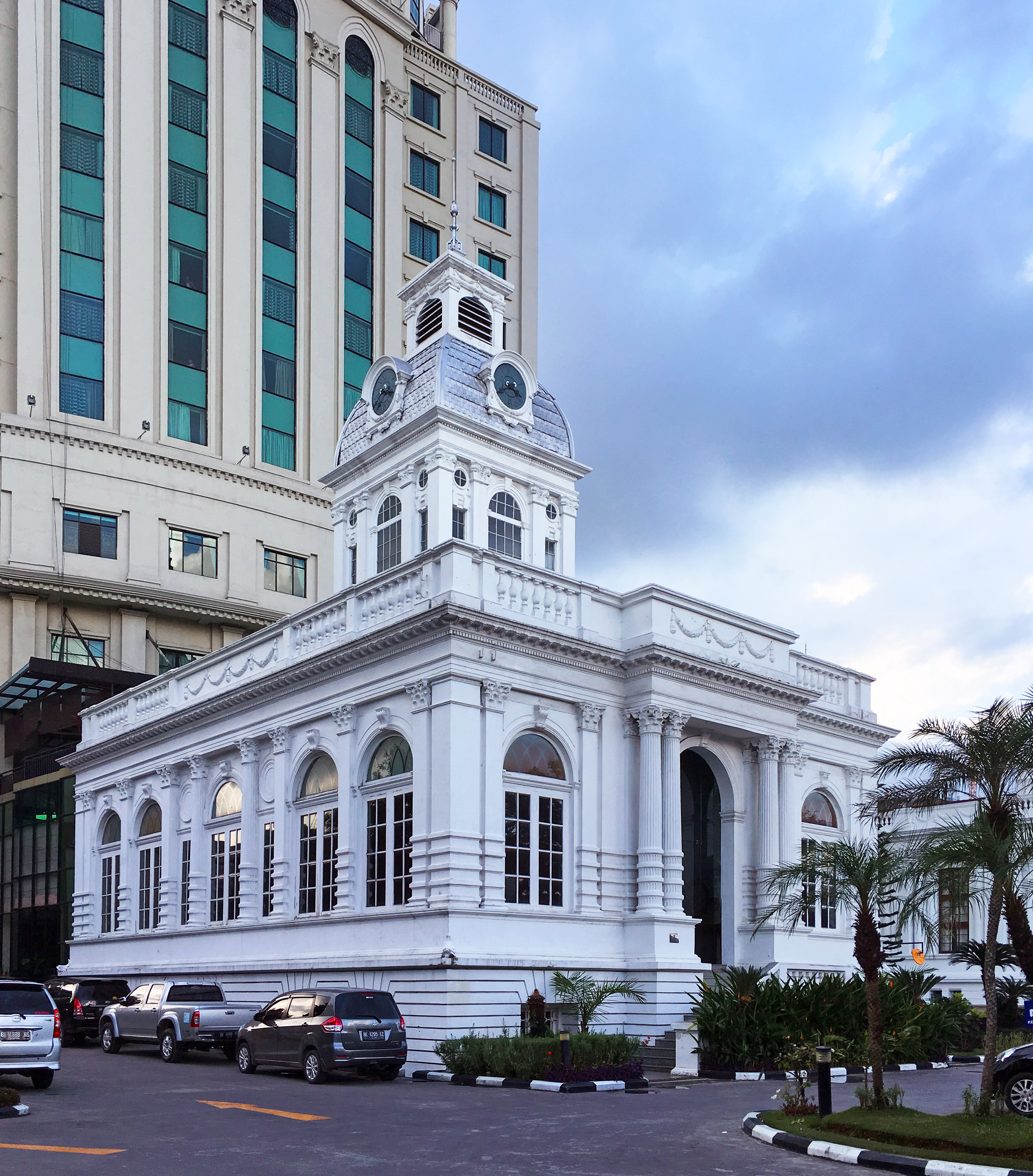
- Front view, 2015

General information
- Type: Hotel
- Location: Jl. Balai Kota No. 1 Medan 20112, North Sumatra, Indonesia
- Construction started: 1908
- Owner: Grand CityHall Hotel

Design and construction
- Architect: C. Boon (architect of the Deli Group)

Old Medan City Hall is a building located on Jalan Balai Kota (City Hall Street), Medan, North Sumatra.

== Description ==
The Old Medan City Hall was built in 1908 during the Dutch colonial period. The building was designed by C. Boon, an architect for the Deli Group.

The City Hall is kilometre zero in Medan, and was originally built for the Bank of Java (now Bank Indonesia), but was instead purchased by the City Council of Medan. Its bell was donated in 1913 from the Tjong A Fie Mansion.

Medan City Hall is now owned and managed by the Grand CityHall Hotel hotel-office-retail complex, situated just behind it.

== Gallery ==
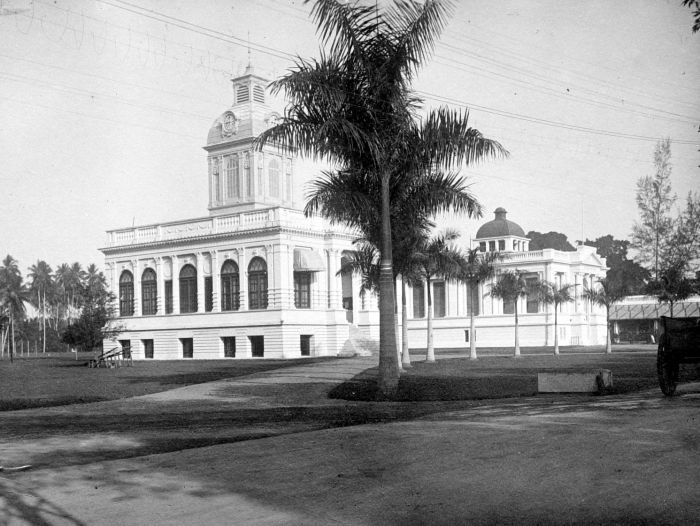
Old City Hall and the Bank of Java (now Bank Indonesia)

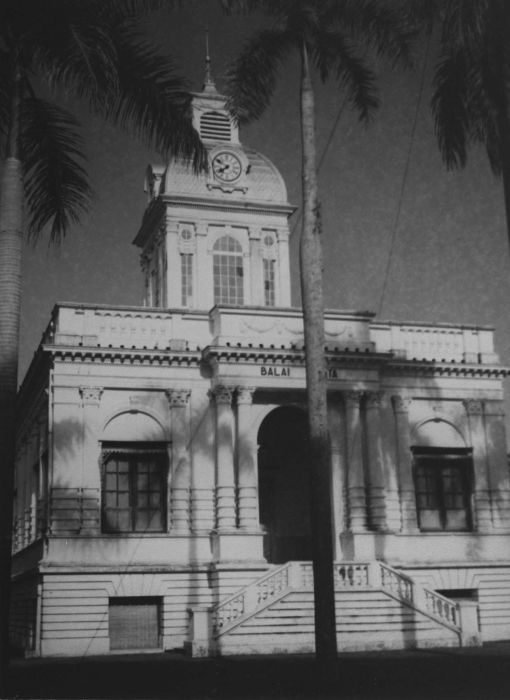
Medan City Hall, circa 1950

== See also ==
- Colonial architecture of Indonesia
- List of colonial buildings in Medan
- Medan Post Office
