= Analisa =

Indonesian daily newspaper based in Medan

- Membangkitkan Partisipasi Rakyat Dalam Pembangunan (Generating People's Participation in the Development)
- Type: Daily newspaper
- Format: Broadsheet
- Owner: PT Media Warta Kencana
- Founded: 23 March 1972
- Language: Indonesian
- Headquarters: Jalan Ahmad Yani No. 35-49, Medan, North Sumatra 20111, Indonesia
- City: Medan
- Country: Indonesia
- ISSN: 0215-2940
- Website: analisadaily.com

Analisa (non-standard Indonesian for Analysis) is a broadsheet newspaper published daily in Medan, the capital of the North Sumatra province in Indonesia. Published since 23 March 1972, Analisa is one of the largest newspaper in Medan. It was initially published once a week before becoming a daily newspaper.
