= Palembang Mayoral Office =

Historic building

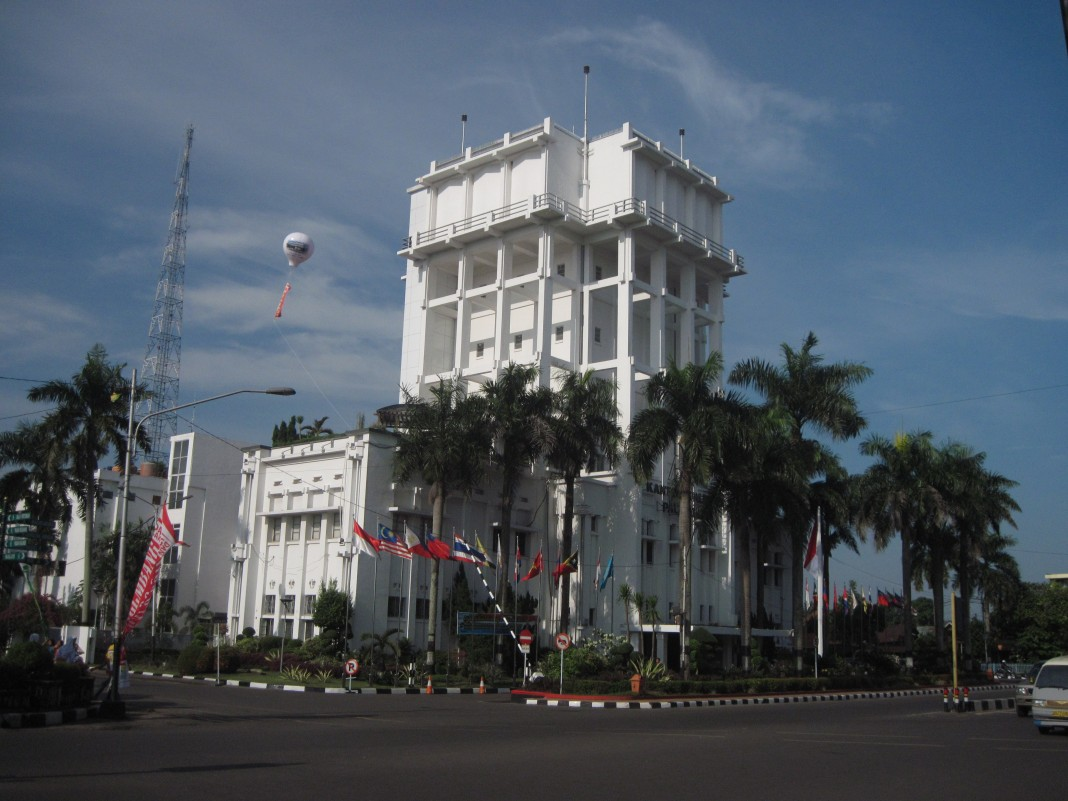

General information
- Location: Jl. Merdeka No.1, 22 Ilir, Palembang
- Coordinates: 2.9910°S 104.7567°E

The Palembang Mayoral Office, also known as Kantor Ledeng, is an office building in Palembang, South Sumatra, Indonesia, which is used as the seat of the municipal government of the city. It was built as a water tower with an office for the colonial government on the lower floors by the Dutch, and was later also used by Japanese authorities during the Japanese occupation of the city.

== History ==
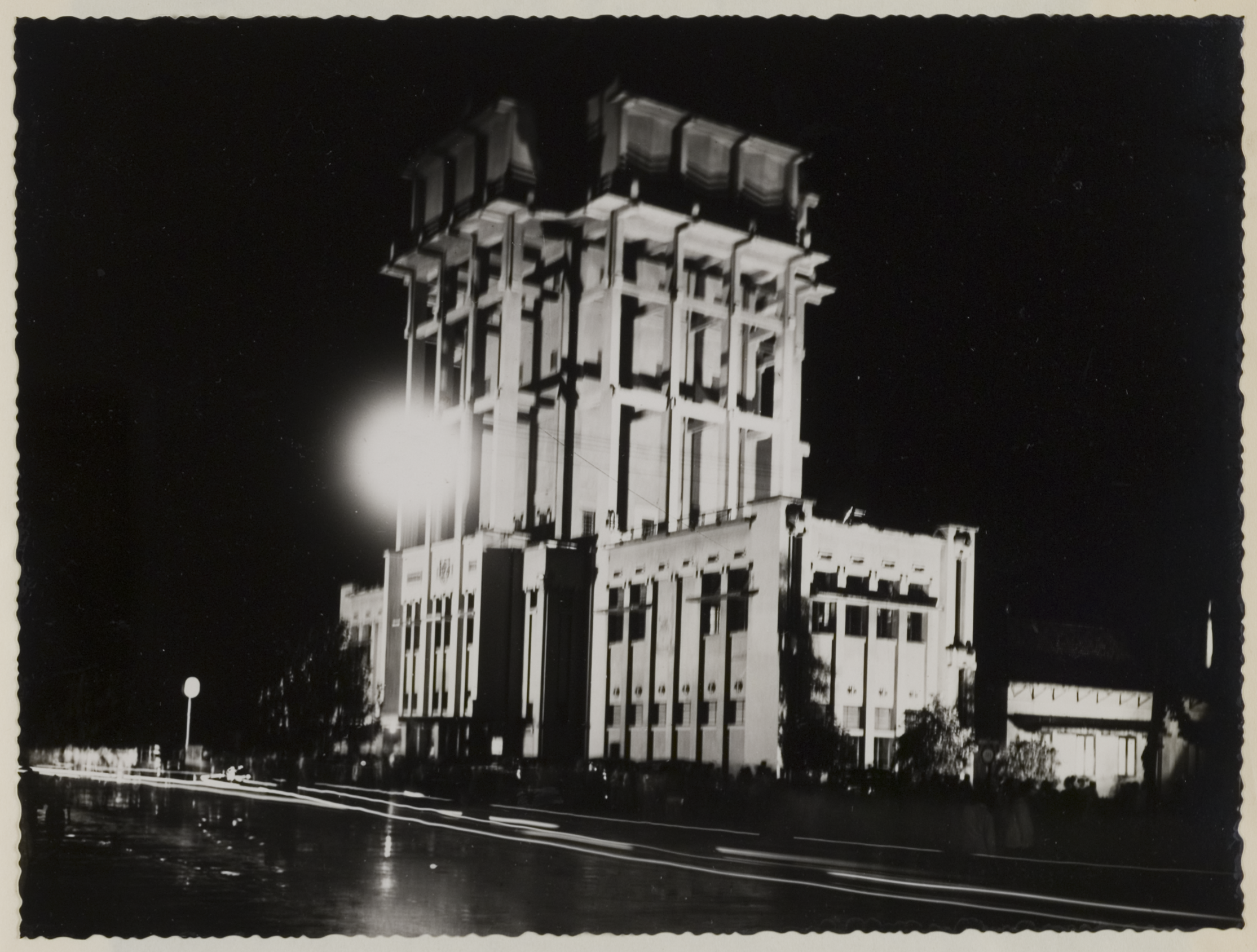
Palembang Water Tower in 1937

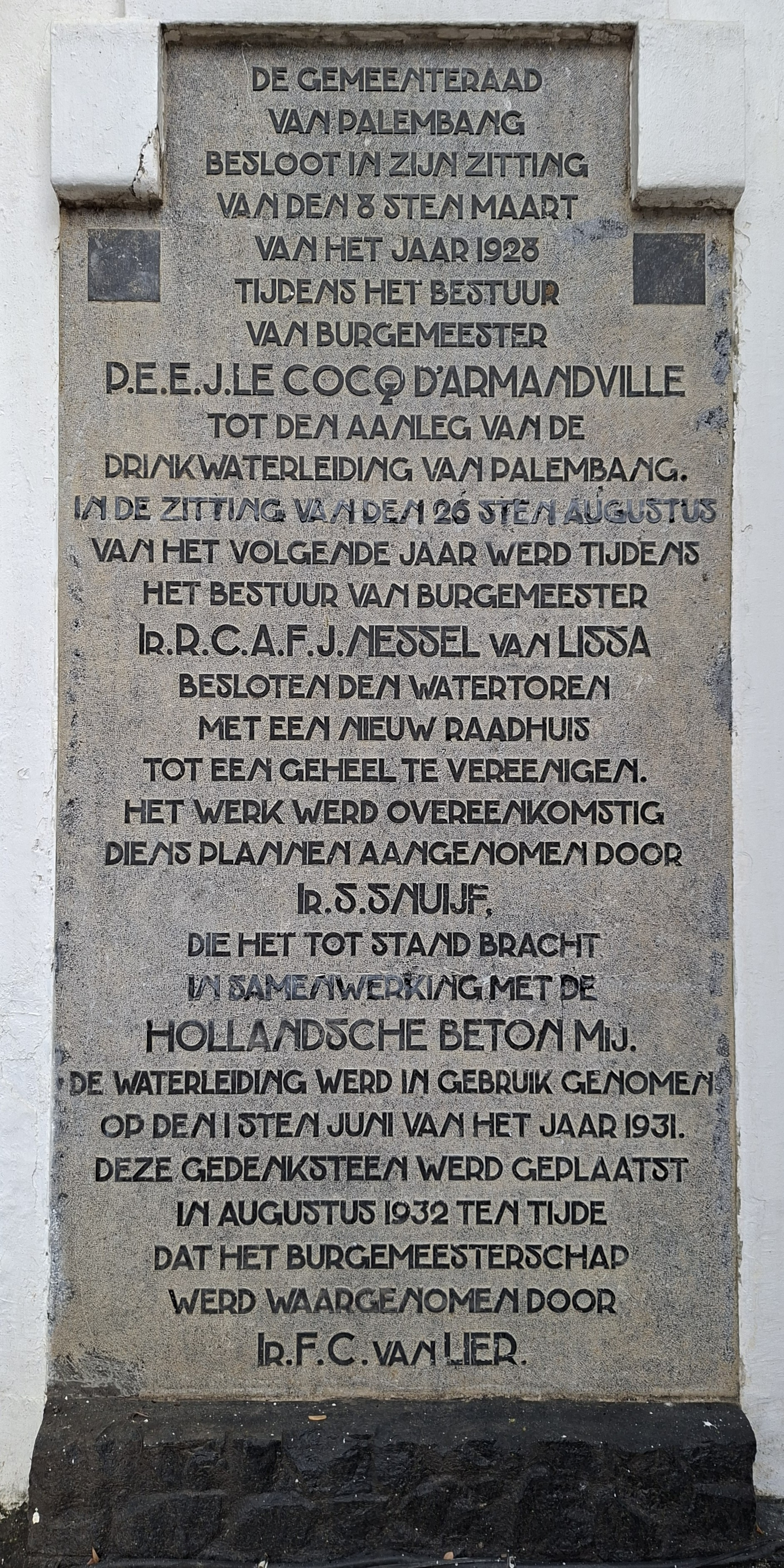
A 1932 inscription commemorating the completion of the building the year before, rediscovered behind the wall plaster during revitalization in 2024

The building was constructed between 1928 and 1931, with S. Snuijf as the architect. The building served a dual function as both a water tower and the city hall, with the building being occupied by the Dutch colonial government's municipality (gemeente) of Palembang after its completion. Following the Japanese invasion of the Dutch East Indies, the building became the seat of the Japanese administrator of Palembang Residency. After the proclamation of Indonesian independence in August 1945, large crowds led by nationalists such as Adnan Kapau Gani took over the building from the Japanese administrators, flying the Indonesian flag on 25 August.

After the end of the Indonesian National Revolution, the building was used by the municipal government as the city hall until 1956, and since 1963 it was used as the mayor's office. It is currently designated as a Cultural Property of Indonesia, and designated as a tourist destination by the city's tourism department. A granite inscription commemorating the building's opening was discovered behind a wall next to its entranceway during renovation works in 2024.

== Building ==
The water tower was built with the intent of providing fresh water especially to the Dutch population of Palembang, which prior to the building's construction relied on water taken directly from the Musi River. Initially, the 35-meter white building had a floor space of 250 square meters, and the water tank had a carrying capacity of 1,200 cubic meters. The building's site was chosen to be next to two small tributaries of the Musi: the Sekanak and Kapuran rivers, although the Kapuran no longer exists today. It was constructed at a cost of reportedly one ton of gold, following the De Stijl style of architecture commonly found in other colonial government buildings in Indonesia, resulting in a cubical building shape and a flat rooftop. The façade of the building featured six cement pillars, with andesite walls and three doors.

The building underwent renovations to expand the office space in 1970. As of 2021, three floors of the building are still in use - with the vice-mayor and municipal secretary working in the second floor and the mayor in the third floor. The old water tower's plumbing still exists in the modern building and is protected as a cultural property, starting from the building's fourth floor. A three-story extension building behind the main water tower building houses several departments of the municipal government.
