= Hotel de Boer =

- Inna Dharma Deli Hotel
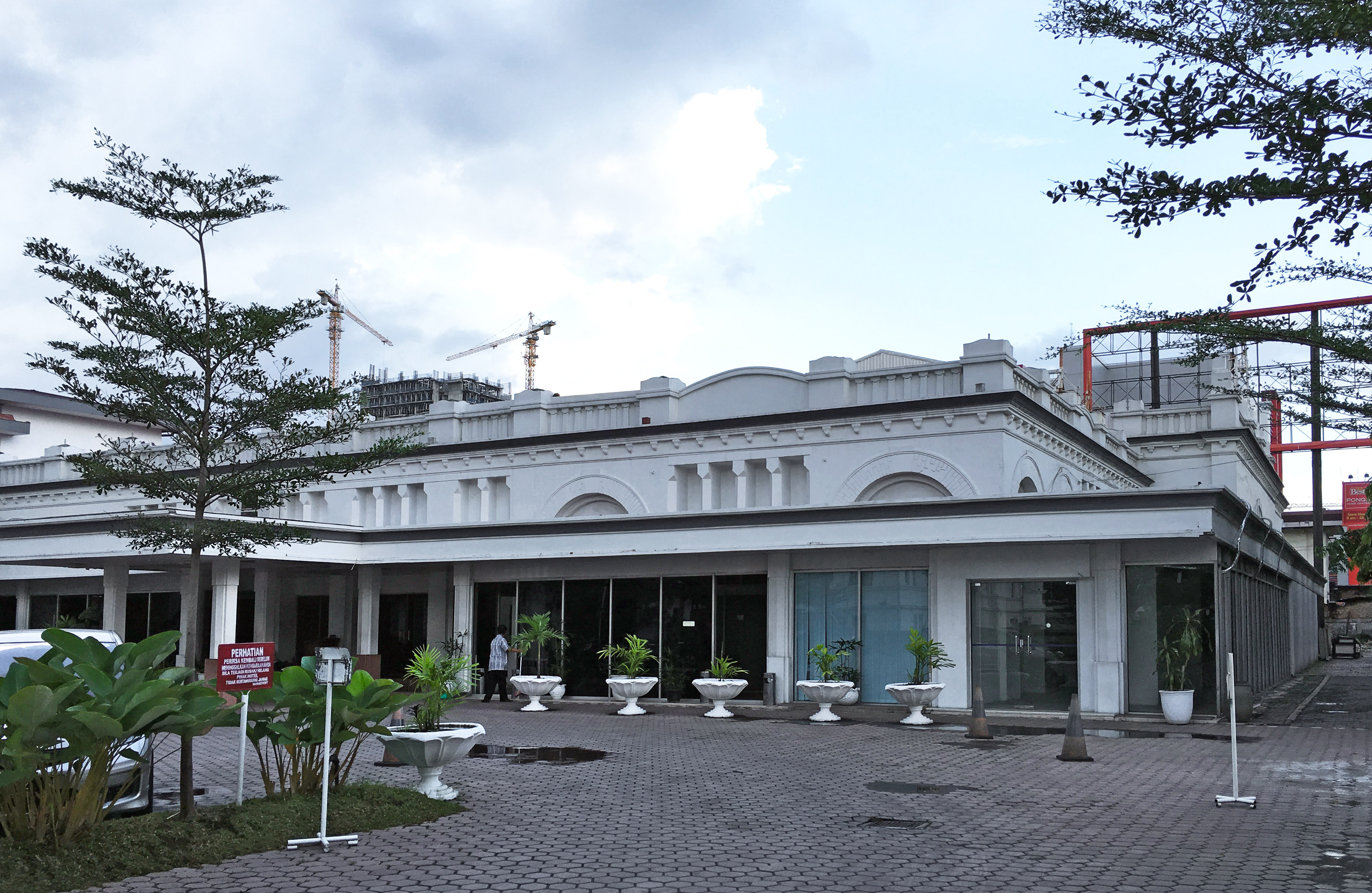
- Front view of the Hotel
- Interactive map of the Hotel de Boer area

General information
- Type: Hotel
- Location: Jl. Balaikota No.2, Medan, North Sumatra, Indonesia
- Coordinates: 3.59143°N 98.67645°E
- Completed: 1898
- Owner: Inna Hotel Group

Design and construction
- Developer: Inna Hotel Group

NV Hotel Mijn de Boer (more popularly called by Hotel de Boer, now Inna Dharma Deli Hotel) is a Dutch colonial style hotel located on the Cremerweg (now Jalan Balai Kota), Medan, Dutch East Indies, current-day Indonesia. The hotel was built in 1898 by Workum native and Dutch businessman Aeint Herman de Boer.

De Boer migrated to Dutch East Indies in late nineteenth century. First, he settled in Surabaya and became a part proprietor of a restaurant in Surabaya. In 1809, he migrated to Medan and began his new business. In early 1898, he built Hotel De Boer which just contained a restaurant, a bar, and seven rooms. In 1909, de Boer expanded his hotel by adding 40 rooms. In 1930, Hotel De Boer was expanded by adding 120 rooms and a huge hall.

In colonial times, this hotel was once inhabited by guests of honor of the Dutch Empire government like King Leopold II of Belgium and Prince Friedrich Christian of Schaumburg-Lippe (nephew of Queen Wilhelmina of the Netherlands), and also Dutch Frisian famous spy Mata Hari. Sutan Sjahrir, the first Prime Minister of Indonesia had ever been a violinist in this hotel during his school years in Medan.

== Gallery ==
Historic photos of Hotel de Boer

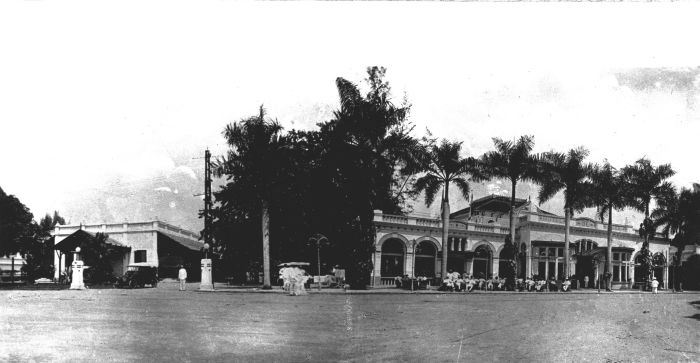
The façade of Hotel de Boer in the center of Medan (1918–1919)

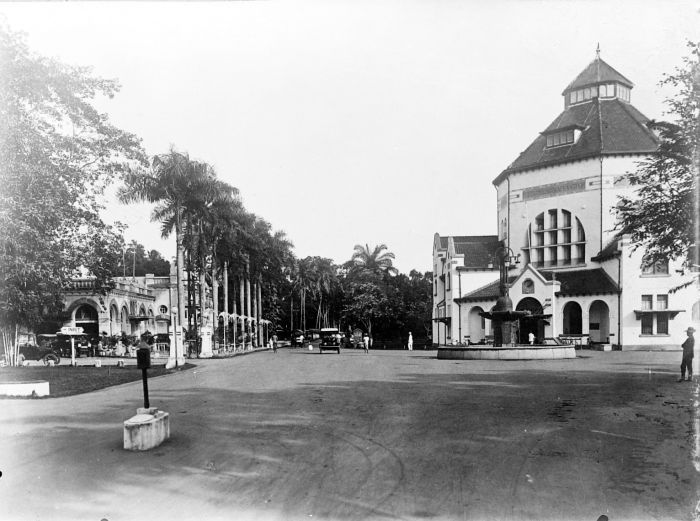
Hotel De Boer and Medan Post and Telegraph Office (1920–1938)

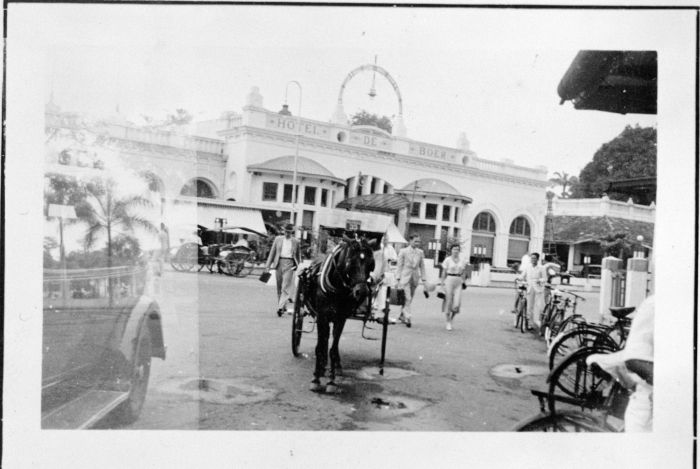
Traffic in the street in front of the Hotel de Boer in 1936

== See also ==
- List of colonial buildings in Medan

== Cited works ==
- Leushuis, Emile (2011). Gids historische stadswandelingen Indonesië [Guide historic city tours Indonesia] (in Dutch). Amsterdam: KIT Publishers. ISBN 9789460221620. Archived from the original on March 7, 2016.
- Loderichs, M.A. (November 1997). Medan – Beeld van een stad [Medan – Pictures of a city] (in Dutch). Purmerend: Asia Maior. ISBN 9074861105.
