= Sri Mariamman Temple, Medan =

Hindu place of worship on Sumatra, Indonesia

Sri Mariamman Temple
- ஸ்ரீ மாரியம்மன் கோவில் Kuil Shri Mariamman
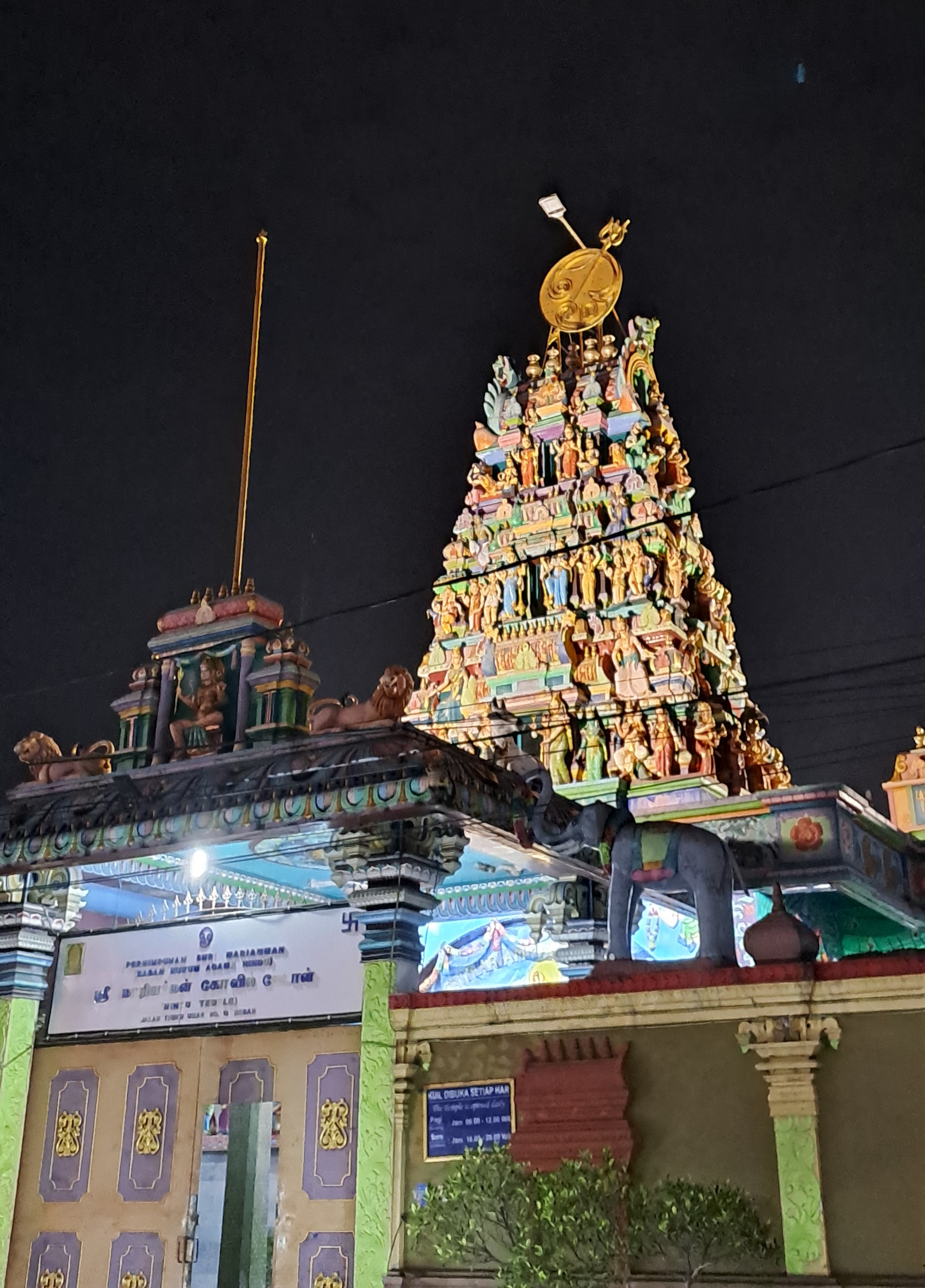
- The Gopuram of Sri Mariamman Temple, Medan

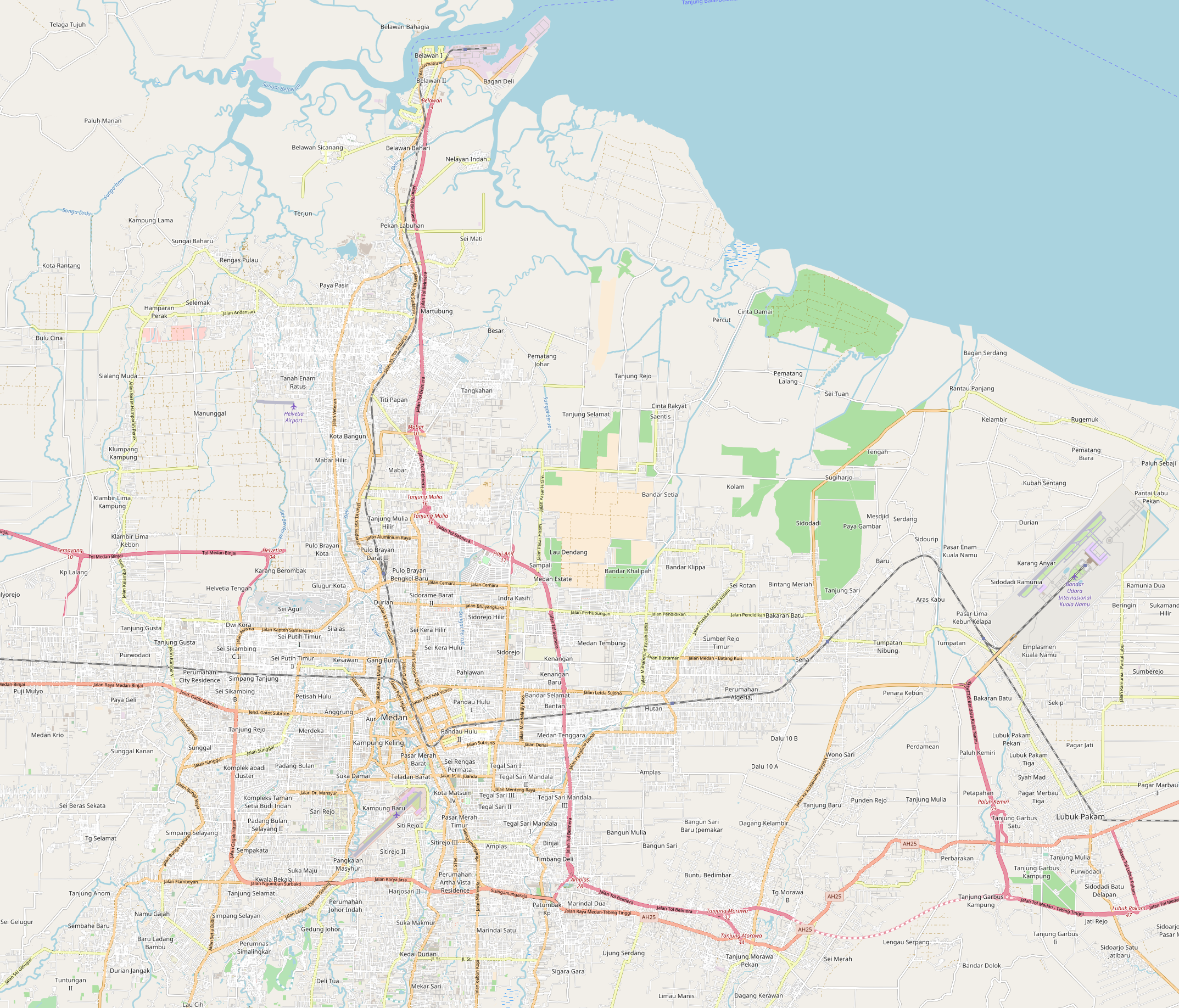
- Location in Medan, Indonesia

Religion
- Affiliation: Hinduism
- District: Medan Petisah
- Deity: Mariamman
- Festival: Thaipusam

Location
- Location: Medan
- State: North Sumatera
- Country: Indonesia
- Interactive map of Sri Mariamman Temple
- Coordinates: 3°35′02.1″N 98°40′15.6″E

Architecture
- Type: Dravidian architecture
- Completed: 1884

Sri Mariamman Temple is Medan's oldest Hindu Temple. This temple was built in 1884 for the worship of Goddess Mariamman. The temple is situated in the area known as Kampung Madras or Medan's Little India. This temple is also devoted to the Hindu gods Ganesha and Murugan, children of Mariamman. The Gate is decorated by gopuram, namely a storey tower which can usually be found at the gate of the Hindus temples in South India. The temple is a meeting point for worshippers during Thaipusam and Deevapali festivals.

== History ==
This temple was built in 1884 and is the oldest Hindu temple in the city of Medan. It serves as a place for the worship of Goddess Mariamman. This temple was built by co-operative efforts of all the early Tamil settlers in Medan, who worked at a plantation company located in North Sumatra. The temple was also headed by Sami Rangga Naiker and Somusundram Vaithiyar, Ramasamy Vaithiyar, who were donors for the construction of this temple.

The Sri Mariamman temple is located on the street Teuku Umar 18, which is 500 meters from the Gunung Timur Temple. This temple is located in Kampung Madras, an area in Medan populated predominantly by Tamil who are Hindus. This temple is adjacent to the Sun Plaza. The temple shares the same architecture as other Hindu temples in South India and Sri Lanka, unlike several other Hindu temples in other part of Indonesia that conform to the Javanese or Balinese style. The Sri Mariamman temple was inaugurated for its use for Hindu Dharma on October 23, 1991, by the ex-Governor of North Sumatra H. Raja Inal Siregar.

== Deities ==
Sri Mariamman temple was named after the goddess Mariamman. According to Hindu belief, Mariamman is the goddess who is believed to have the power to cure many diseases, relieve mild forms diseases, and reduce outbreaks of severe illnesses. In addition she can bring rain when an area is suffering drought. The goddess is worshiped in several regions of South India, such as Andhra Pradesh, Tamil Nadu and Karnataka. Besides being used to worship Mariamman, the temple is also used to worship the Hindu deities Vishnu, Ganesha, Shiva, Durga, Murugan etc.

== Architecture ==
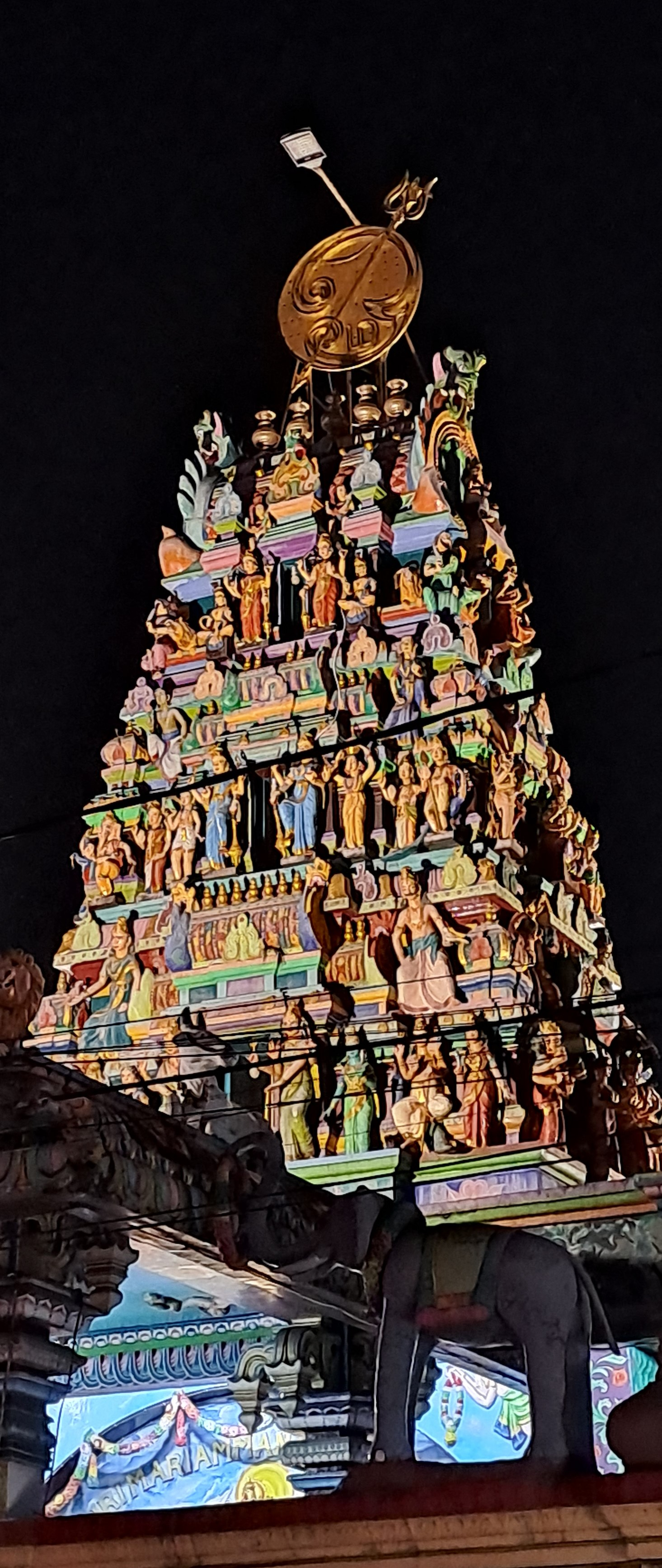
Several diorama statues of Hindu deities on top of the temple

The temple is surrounded by walls, with the height of 2.5 meters. In the front is the entrance to the Temple of Arca Tuwarasakti; reliefs and a statue of Lord Shiva are above the entrance. Tuwarasakti is described as a woman, because she is the guardian of goddess Mariamman as well. She has a beautiful face, with four arms that carry a trident, mace and pasa, and a hand attitude that counts a warning.

On the front wall to the right there is a statue of Lakshmi. The statue in the middle, is the statue of the Hindu priest, depicted as wearing a turban, having a thick mustache, as a typology of the Tamil people. On the front wall, in the left, there is a statue of Parvathi. The Parvathi statue is two armed with one hand holding a water pot.

There are three chambers inside the temple where worship takes places. In the chambers, there are several statues, representing Vishnu, Siva and Brahma. There are many unique ornaments in the temple, including statues that make the temple more beautiful.

In the inner sanctum, the deities Murugan, Vishnu, the child Murugan and Narayanan are worshipped.

On the Section to the left are the deities Vinayagar; Brahma, Siva, Vishnu; Agastya and Siva, Parvathi and Nandi.

Behind the temple, Krishna, Raja Rajeswari and Thillai Natarajar are enshrined.

== Gallery ==
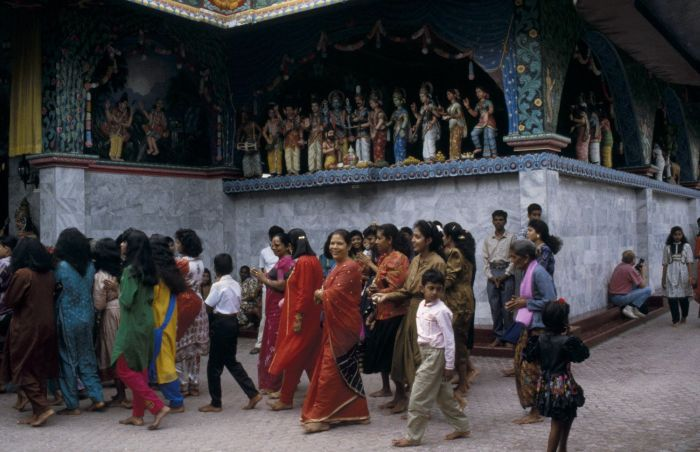
Hindu devotees entering the temple, 1993

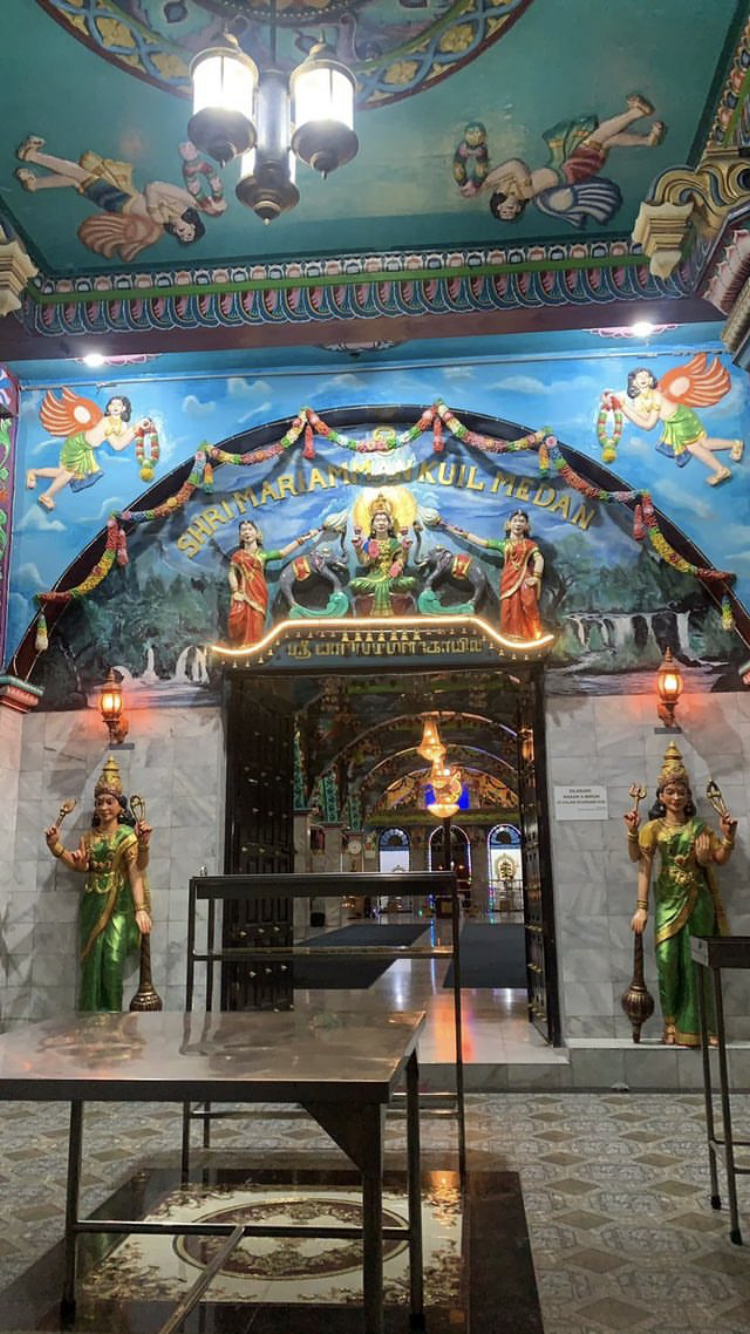
The temple main entrance
