= Sutomo School =

Sutomo School Perguruan Sutomo
- 蘇東中學 so͘e tong tiòng ha̍k
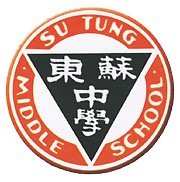

Information
- Type: Private
- Established: 25 February 1926
- Session: Single session
- Song: Mars Sutomo
- Website: http://sutomo-mdn.sch.id/

Sutomo School is a group of private schools in Medan, Indonesia, managed by the Sutomo Education Foundation. This group currently consists of Sutomo 1 and Sutomo 2. Both schools feature education levels from kindergarten, elementary, middle, and high school, with the exception of a playgroup (pre-school), which is only available in Sutomo 1. Between the two schools, Sutomo 1 is more dominant and widely known.

Sutomo 1's playgroup, kindergarten, and elementary school buildings are located at Jalan Jambi, while the junior and senior high school buildings are located in Jalan Letkol Martinus Lubis. Sutomo 2 is located entirely in Pulo Brayan, in the western side of Medan.

More than 15 students have enrolled in Sutomo School. Majority of the students are of Chinese descent (about 80%), while 40% of the teachers are of Chinese descent.

== History ==
Sutomo School was formerly called Sutung School (蘇東; "East Sumatra") when it was established in 1926. On 25 February 1958, the name of the school was changed to Sutomo School in conjunction with the establishment of Sutomo Education Foundation by Soo Lean Toii, Oei Moh Toan, and Hadi Kusuma (Khoo Peng Huat). Initially, Sutomo School only provided education in elementary school through high school. Kindergarten and playgroup was introduced in 1964 and 1992, respectively.

Initially, all education activities were run at Jalan Letkol Martinus Lubis. In 1978, kindergarten and elementary school activities were moved to a new building at Jalan Jambi. In 1982, Sutomo 2 was built on Jalan Yos Sudarso, and the old Sutomo School building was renamed to Sutomo 1. Plans to move the school to Jalan Pancing in Medan Tembung could not be realized due to financial crisis that had struck Indonesia in the middle of the 1990s. In 2004, the foundation began constructing new Middle/High School buildings at Sutomo 1. In 2019, they finished the construction of 'Heritage' as a mini-museum.

== Curriculum and education system ==
Ever since 1995/96, Sutomo implemented the "Plus Class" (superior class) system which aims to accommodate the most outstanding students, where the course materials progress more quickly and sometimes reaches more advanced levels than the regular classes (Sutomo still uses the national curriculum of Indonesia as a baseline, but they modified the depth and breadth of the subjects to be more advanced). In 2001, the school has been granted permission by the Director-General of Education to open an accelerated class where the high school education can be completed within a period of 2 years instead of the usual three. However, this accelerated course was removed in 2015.
