= Tjong A Fie Mansion =

Mansion in Medan, North Sumatra

Coordinates: 3°35′7.62″N 98°40′49.188″E

- Rumah Tjong A Fie 張阿輝 故居
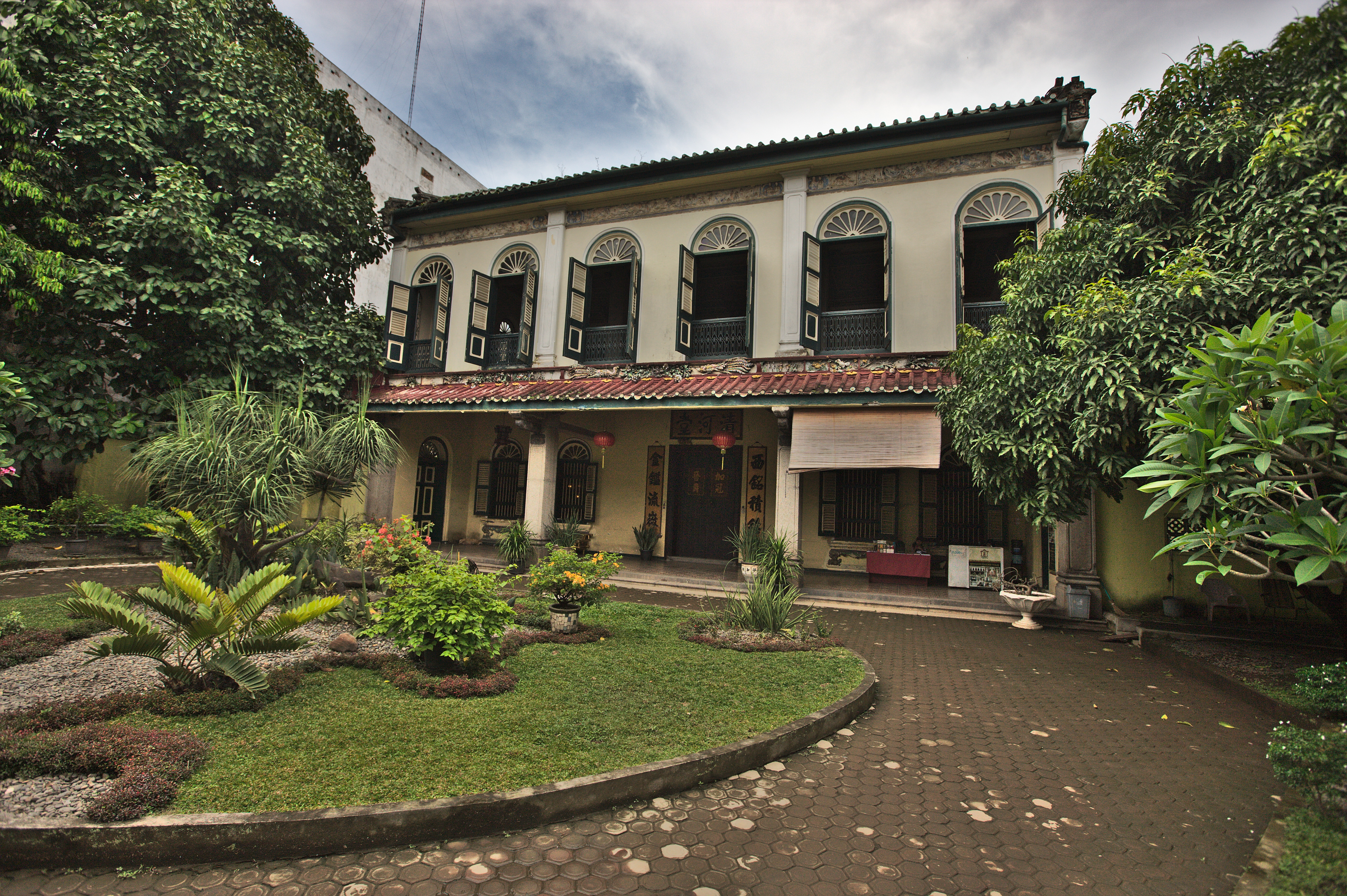
- Front view of the mansion
- Interactive map of the Tjong A Fie Mansion area

General information
- Type: Historic House Museum
- Architectural style: Peranakan architecture, Art Deco elements
- Location: Medan, North Sumatra, Indonesia
- Groundbreaking: 1895
- Construction started: 1895
- Completed: 1900
- Inaugurated: 1900 (as residence)

Height
- Roof: Tiled roof (traditional Chinese style)
- Top floor: 2

Technical details
- Floor count: 2

Design and construction
- Architect: unknown

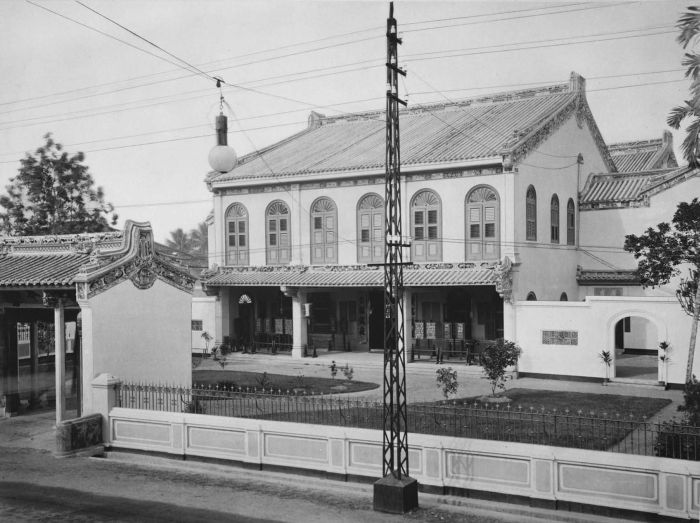
the mansion (1930)

Tjong A Fie Mansion (traditional Chinese: 張耀軒 故居; simplified Chinese: 张耀轩 故居; pinyin: Zhāng Yàoxuān Gùjū) is a Sino Portuguese-style two-story mansion in Medan, North Sumatra, built by Tjong A Fie (1860–1921) a Hakka merchant who came to own much of the land in Medan through his plantations, later becoming 'Majoor der Chineezen' (leader of the Chinese') in Medan and constructing the Medan-Belawan railway.

Tjong A Fie is said to be related to Cheong Fatt Tze, who built the Cheong Fatt Tze Mansion in Penang, Malaysia.

The building is constructed in Chinese-European style, and was completed in 1900. Although it has been stated in some sources to have been modeled on the Cheong Fatt Tze Mansion in Penang, Malaysia, that mansion was not completed until 1904.
