= Medan LRT =

Future light metro system in Medan, Indonesia

Overview
- Owner: Kereta Api Indonesia
- Area served: Medan
- Locale: Medan, Indonesia
- Transit type: Rapid transit
- Number of lines: 3 (planned)
- Number of stations: 17 (planned)

Operation
- Operation will start: TBA
- Operator: Indonesian Railway Company
- Number of vehicles: 20 (planned)
- Train length: 2

Technical
- System length: 41.3 kilometres (25.7 miles) (planned)
- No. of tracks: 2
- Track gauge: 1,067 mm (3 ft 6 in)
- Electrification: 750 V Third rail
- Top speed: 80 km/h

The Medan Light Rail Transit (Medan LRT) is a planned light rail transit system in Medan, Indonesia. Made due to concerns of the congested future of the city, the government deems the project, alongside the Bus Rapid Transit (BRT), necessary. The project was announced in 2017 as a public-private partnership, with many international corporations began bidding. Construction began in 2019, but was disturbed the following year due to the COVID-19 pandemic. As of 2025, there have been no major developments. The LRT will use one rolling stock, with more than 20 stations divided into three lines.

== History ==
Medan, home to more than 2.5 million people, offers several modes of public transportation. Every year, the city experiences an average of 0.3% increase in population. Despite that, 98% of the population uses private, instead of public, transportation, with an 6% average increase in vehicle quantity every year according to the North Sumatra Department of Transportation. If this continues, by 2024, Medan was predicted to be gridlocked. Then-Vice Mayor Akhyar Nasution called the need for a rail system "mandatory" and urgent; this is confirmed by the city's Spatial and Regional Plan for 2022-2042. Other than gridlock prevention, the 2024 National Sports Week (PON) was to be held in Medan, hinting the need for easy mobility. Along with the Bus Rapid Transit (BRT), the Medan Light Rail Transit (Medan LRT) is part of a governmental masterplan (RPJMN) of 2020–2024, and is expected to have 4,473,996 passengers per year. On 5 May, 2017, the government of Medan settled an agreement with the Indonesian Ministry of Finance in regards to the facilities the light rail transit system will have.

The project was given a concession period of 20 years. On 6 June, 2017, detik.com revealed that the total budget required to create the LRT requires Rp 6,34 billion or US$477.4 million, (Note: Conversion done in 2017.) including Rp 2,2 billion for rolling stock; this later changes to Rp 12,339 billion, and then Rp 20,3 billion. Budgeting for the project uses blended finance to not involve state budget. As a public-private partnership, the project has an availability payment of Rp 5,755 billion/year. The estimated profits from fares would cover around 70% of the budget, with 25% from property developments in areas affected by transit-oriented development (TOD), and 5% from advertisements. Hence, the LRT would break-even after 12.69 years of operation, with a "very good" profitability index of 1.62.

SMRT Corporation announced it will help with the project using their experiences. In 2018, companies from China and South Korea have expressed interest in developing the project. In June 2019, Korea Rail Network Authority was announced as the preferred partner, and it was planned that the LRT will connect the contiguous North Sumatran areas of Medan, Binjai, Deli Serdang and Karo, collectively named Mebidangro, which is also the LRT's nickname. The International Monetary Fund (IMF) and the World Bank also expressed interest in an LRT system in Medan. Coordinator of the Ministry of Maritimes Affairs and Fisheries, Luhut Binsar Pandjaitan, asked for the project to utilize 60% of "local components" and not foreign products as a redemption to the government's financial shortcomings, which they did, with the help of PT Kereta Api Indonesia (INKA), with the help of the Ministry of State Owned Enterprises (BUMN). On 5 April 2019, an open-to-public press conference was held; 190 people attended it.

The project's online business case ended in 2019, and the final business case commenced in late 2020. Throughout that year, it underwent a phase of worthiness test and "Detail Engineering Design" (DED). Construction of the LRT started in 2019 and the LRT itself was expected to begin operations in 2020, however it was affected by the COVID-19 pandemic. Planning and conferences, though, still continues amid the pandemic, even though progress slowed down. North Sumatra's Development Planning Board secretary Yosi Sukmono said that construction should continue in 2021. Before the pandemic, it was expected to finish by 2023. Planning and conferences include studying which places would mandate stations, as well as the LRT's accessibility. In August 2020, construction was planned to finish in 2023 and operations to begin in early 2024. However, there have been no major developments in 2024, leading to skepticism on the government's commitment regarding the project. Rahman Syah of Kompasiana noted several challenges: a lack of planning on the station locations and integration with the BRT network, as well as Medan's unaccomodating density.

== Infrastructure ==
The LRT's rolling stock will have a maximum speed of 80 km/h. In accordance with Pandjaitan's request on utilizing mostly local components, the traction motor was planned as a joint production by Pindad and Bombardier Transportation, with the aluminium bogie by Inalum. Industri Kereta Api would oversee the production of the traction motor, as well as create the carriages. With 20 units, it cost Rp 488.016 billion. One vehicle will be able to capacitate 200-300 passengers, with 20-25% seated.

All stations will be infill and elevated, with the tracks spanning 41.3 kilometres (25.7 miles) in total. The LRT was initially announced to comprise 22 stations from the southwest to northeast of Medan, forming one line. Later, however, it was expanded to three:

- Line 1: Medan to Sport Center Batang Kuis station (spanning 20 kilometres (12 miles))
- Line 2: Aksara to Lau Cih station (spanning 17.21 kilometres (10.69 miles))
- Line 3: Pancing to Cemara station (spanning 3.37 kilometres (2.09 miles))

The stations were also reduced to 17. A train depot will also be built at Lau Cih station. The budget for the stations, tracks, depot, and other operation facilities altogether create a budget of Rp 16.9 trillion.

TOD was taken into account in selecting the station locations. The termini was initially planned to be Medan and Universitas Medan station, but this was later cancelled. Other stations include: RS Adam Malik, Sekolah Siti Hajar, Santo Thomas, Ring Road, Pasar II, Perumahan Setiabudi, Raz Plaza, USU Pintu IV, RS USU, Iskandar Muda, Kampung Madras, RS Malahayati, Walikota, Lapangan Merdeka, Podomoro City, Hotel Grand Angkasa, RS Pringadi, Masjid 45, Al Amin Faisal Tanjung, and Aksara station. Later, Cemara, Sport Center Batang Kuis and Pancing station were also announced. Many of these stations are located next to (and named after) hospitals, universities, and shopping malls.

While the routes saw positive reception by many citizens of Medan, those whose properties are affected by the construction were critical on the project. Government officials conducted private negotiations with those whose homes would have to be destroyed to make way for the LRT; those who perist in objecting to the project were given 14 days to file a lawsuit. Meanwhile, transportation analyst Deddy Herlambang advised that the government design the route in a way that would not affect the streets, to avoid cumbersome rerouting as experienced when constructing the Palembang LRT.

In addition, General Director of PT Medan Metropolitan Monorel, Kaspan Eka Putra, also devised an extension spanning 61.59 kilometres (38.27 miles) comprising three phases. It begins in the city of Tanjung Morawa, entering the Medan district of Amplas and moving to the area of SM Raja road before ending at MT Haryono road (21.7 kilometres (13.5 miles)). Phase two continues to the roads of Wahidin, Aksara, Willem Iskandar, and then entering the housing complex Cemara Asri (9.81 kilometres (6.10 miles)). Phase three begins at the Centre Point mall, continuing to Yos Sudarso road, Brayan, and then Marelan (11.61 kilometres (7.21 miles)). The last phase spans the City Hall and the roads of Iskandar Muda, Setia Budi, Ring Road, and Gatot Subroto, terminating at Sunggal 18.47 kilometres (11.48 miles).

== See also ==
- Jabodebek LRT
- Jakarta LRT
- Palembang LRT
