= Medan Kota Belawan =

District in Medan City, North Sumatra Province, Indonesia

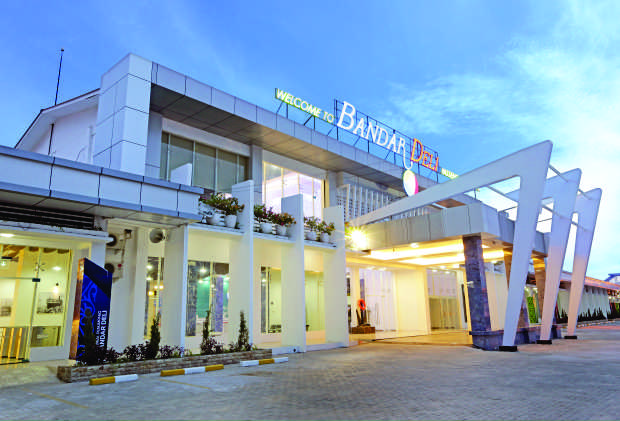
The Bandar Deli terminal in Belawan

Medan Kota Belawan (or simply Medan Belawan) is the most northern of the 21 districts (kecmatan) comprising the city of Medan in North Sumatra Province of Indonesia, and the only one with direst access to the Malacca Strait. The district includes the major commercial Port of Belawan, as well as residential and manufacturing areas.

The boundaries of the district are:

- To the north and west: Hamparan Perak district of Deli Serdang Regency
- To the east: the Malacca Strait, and a small part of Labuhan Deli district of Deli Serdang Regency
- To the south: Medan Labuhan and Medan Marelan

The northern boundary between Medan Kota Belawan and Hamparan Perak Districts is actually the main course of the Deli River, while to the south another outlet of the Deli River separates Medan Kota Belawan from Medan Labuhan and Medan Marelan Districts. In the west, the kelurahan of Belawan Pulau Sicanang (Sicarang Island), with 54% of the land area of the district, is virtually an island in the river, contained between the Deli River and one of its tributaries. In the east, the kelurahan of Bagan Deli (east of Belawan I and Belawan II Districts) projects into the Malacca Strait and contains the majority of the installations of the Port of Belawan.

At the 2010 Census, the district had a population of 95,506 inhabitants, while at the 2020 Census this had risen to 108,987; the latest official estimate (as at mid 2024) is 109,287 (comprising 55,796 males and 53,491 females). The total area is 32.80 km^{2} and the population density in 2024 was 3,332 inhabitants/km^{2}. The district is sub-divided into six urban communities (kelurahan), listed below with their areas and their populations as at mid 2024, together with their postcodes.

Kode Wilayah	Name of kelurahan	Area in km^{2}	Pop'n Estimate mid 2024	Post code
12.71.08.1001	Belawan I	2.69	23,109	20411
12.71.08.1002	Belawan II	1.88	23,842	20412
12.71.08.1003	Belawan Bahagia	0.74	13,471	20415
12.71.08.1004	Belawan Bahari	2.97	12,834	20414
12.71.08.1005	Belawan Pulau Sicanang	17.70	17,819	20412
12.71.08.1006	Bagan Deli	6.81	18,212	20414
12.71.08	Totals	32.80	109,287	

== See also ==
Port of Belawan
