= Sunggal =

Town in North Sumatra, Indonesia

Coordinates: 3°35′N 98°37′E

Sunggal is a town and an administrative district (kecamatan) of Deli Serdang Regency in the province of North Sumatra, Indonesia. The population of the town (which contains the district administration) was 10,071 in 2020 and 10,713 in mid 2024.

== Sunggal District ==
The district, with an area of 92.52 km^{2} and a population of 244,187 at the 2010 Census and 241,359 at the 2020 Census, while the official estimate as at mid 2024 was 254,477 (comprising 127,240 males and 127,237 females). It is composed of seventeen 'villages' (desa), many of which are suburban to the neighbouring city of Medan which is situated to the east of the district. These are set out below with their areas and their populations at the 2010 Census and the 2020 Census, together with their official estimates as at mid 2024. All share the postcode 20351.

Kode Wilayah	Name	Area in km^{2}	Pop'n Census 2010	Pop'n Census 2020	Pop'n Estimate mid 2024
12.07.23.2015	Telaga Sari	2.63	3,228	4,308	4,620
12.07.23.2011	Sei Mencirim	9.78	16,057	20,227	22,962
12.07.23.2012	Suka Maju	6.31	8,167	11,063	10,548
12.07.23.2017	Sei Beras Sekata	4.70	5,718	5,037	5,509
12.07.23.2016	Tanjung Selamat	4.68	8,795	8,977	10,409
12.07.23.2013	Sunggal Kanan	4.12	10,933	10,071	10,713
12.07.23.2010	Medan Krio	8.52	14,649	15,859	17,733
12.07.23.2004	Paya Geli	3.40	19,249	16,537	17,589
12.07.23.2003	Puji Mulyo	3.96	10,938	10,835	11,044
12.07.23.2001	Sei Semayang	12.35	25,967	27,261	29,020

Kode Wilayah	Name	Area in km^{2}	Pop'n Census 2010	Pop'n Census 2020	Pop'n Estimate mid 2024
12.07.23.2007	Sumber Melati Diski	2.80	11,373	9,875	10,898
12.07.23.2014	Serba Jadi	6.44	3,378	3,855	3,911
12.07.23.2005	Mulyorejo	12.40	32,093	32,914	32,936
12.07.23.2002	Kampung Lalang	1.54	8,247	8,400	8,718
12.07.23.2006	Purwodadi	2.16	17,026	16,855	17,750
12.07.23.2008	Tanjung Gusta ^{(a)}	4.61	29,303	23,635	24,002
12.07.23.2009	Helvetia ^{(a)}	2.10	19,066	15,700	16,115
12.07.23	Totals	92.52	244,187	241,359	254,477

Note: (a) Helvetia desa and the eastern part of Tanjung Gusta desa (which lie on the east bank of the Deli River) forms a salient from the rest of the district (which lies on the west bank of the Deli River), stretching between Medan city to the south and Hamparan Perak District and Helvetia desa of Labuhan Deli District to the north.

The seven desa in the right-hand table lie to the north of the Medan-Binjai Toll Road, which crosses the district from east to west; together they cover 32.05 km^{2} with a population of 114,330 in mid 2024. The remaining ten desa lie to the south of that Toll Road, and cover 60.47 km^{2} with a population of 140,147 in mid 2024.
