= Medan Deli =

Medan Deli is one of the 21 districts (kecmatan) comprising the city of Medan in North Sumatra Province of Indonesia.

The boundaries of the district are:

- To the northwest: Medan Marelan
- To the northeast: Medan Labuhan
- To the south: Medan Timur and a small part of Medan Barat
- To the west: Sunggal District and Labuhan Deli District, both in Deli Serdang Regency
- To the east: Percut Sei Tuan District of Deli Serdang Regency

At the 2010 Census, it had a population of 166,793 inhabitants, while at the 2020 Census this had risen to 189,321; the latest official estimate (as at mid 2023) is 196,523 (comprising 99,598 males and 96,925 females). The total area is 19.22 km^{2} and the population density in 2023 was 10,226 inhabitants/km^{2}. The district is sub-divided into six urban communities (kelurahan), listed below with their areas and their populations as at mid 2023, together with their postcodes.

Kode Wilayah	Name of kelurahan	Area in km^{2}	Pop'n Estimate mid 2023	Post code
12.71.06.1001	Titi Papan	3.79	35,298	20244
12.71.06.1002	Tanjung Mulia Hilir	3.20	37,700	20241
12.71.06.1003	Tanjung Mulia	3.07	37,327	20241
12.71.06.1004	Kota Bangun	1.76	13,724	20243
12.71.06.1005	Mabar	3.81	37,906	20242
12.71.06.1006	Mabar Hilir	3.58	34,568	20242
12.71.06	Totals	19.22	196,523	

Titi Papan kelurahan is in the north of the district, bordering Medan Labuhan and Medan Barelan districts, while immediately south of it (and bounded on both east and west sides by Deli Labuhan Regency) is Kota Bangun kelurahan, which forms the narrowest part of the city between the northern group (nearest the sea) and the main section of the city; the other four kelurahan of the district are in that main section.
