= Labuhan Deli =

District in North Sumatra, Indonesia

KITLV - 80214 - Kleingrothe, C.J. - Medan - -Beach at Labuhan, Deli

Labuhan Deli is a district in Deli Serdang Regency, North Sumatra, Indonesia. The district had a total population of 60,190 during the 2010 Census and a total population of 72,425 during the 2020 Census; the official estimate as at mid 2025 was 71,935.

It covers an area of 127.23 sq.km, consisting of three geographically unconnected sections. The desa of Helvetia and Manunggal (the latter was previously part of Helvetia desa) are suburbs lying immediately to the west of Medan city's Medan Deli District. Pematang Johar is a suburb lying immediately to the east of Medan city's Medan Labuhan District.

Telaga Tujuh and Karang Gading are villages lying further to the north on an area of land between Hamparan Perak District (in Deli Serdang Regency) and Secanggang District (in Langkat Regency); while containing 67% of the district's land area, they only have 13.4% of its population.

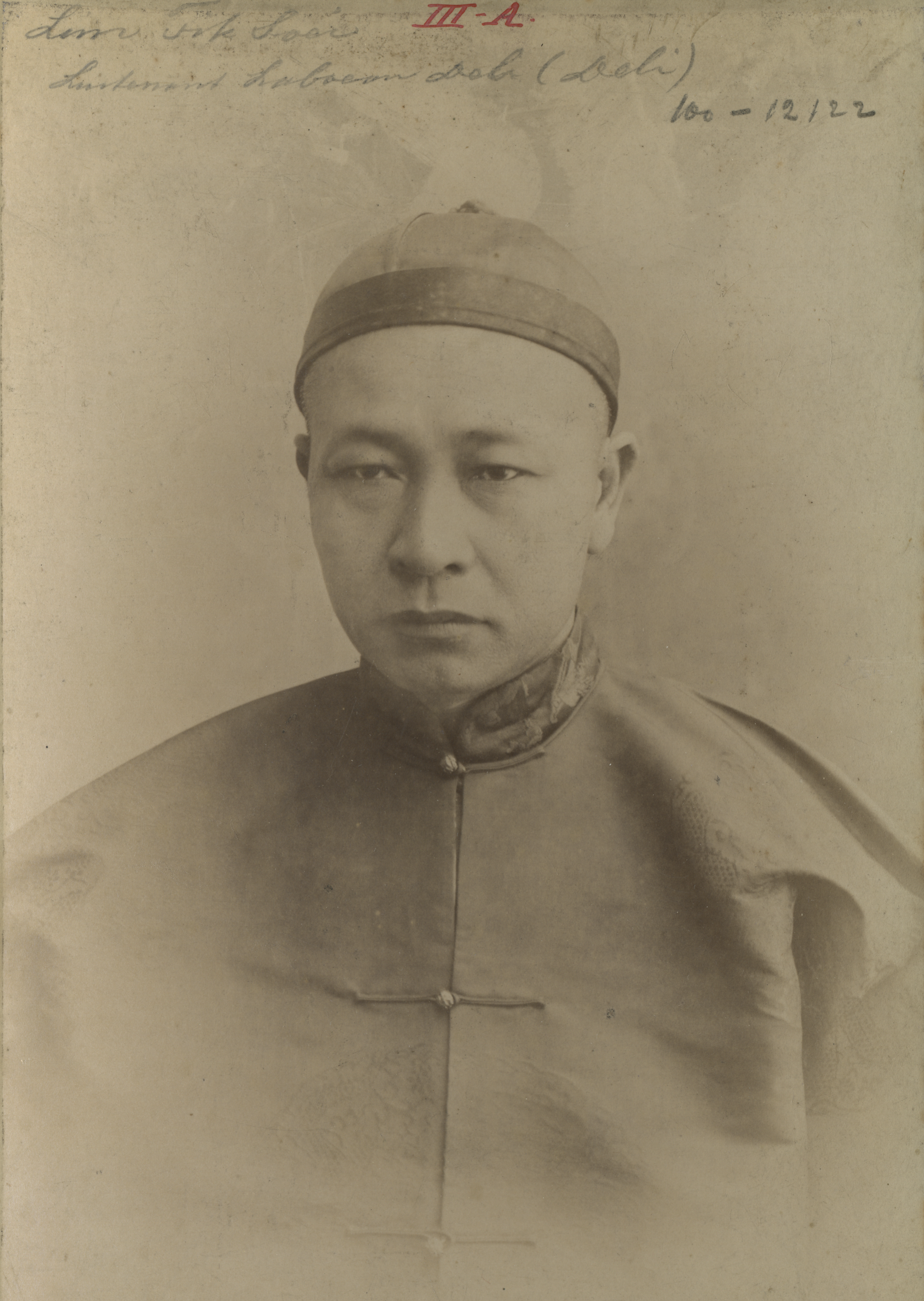
Lambert & Co., G.R. - Singapore - Lieutenant of the Chinese at Labuhan Deli, Sumatra - circa 1880

== History ==
Labuhan Deli comes from the word "harbour (of Deli)"; thus the name records the period when this area was the maritime centre of the Deli Sultanate, and thus - under the authority of the Sultanat - was a part of the history of the Deli Kingdom. During the Dutch colonial era it was a center of trade and other activities. After the independence of the Republic of Indonesia on 17 August 1945 the Deli Kingdom became part of the Deli Serdang Regency, a combination of the Deli Sultanate and the Serdang Sultanate.

The subsequent rapid growth of the city of Medan as the capital of North Sumatra Province and as a center of government, trade and industry led to an expansion of the city boundaries, so that in 1974 most of the villages in Labuhan Deli District became part of the Medan City administration. The widely-separated remaining parts of the district contain what was left over after the expansion of the city, together with two much more rural villages (Telaga Tujuh and Karang Gading) in the far north of the regency.

== Villages ==
From 1974 Labuhan Deli District consisted of four villages (desa), namely Helvetia Village, Pematang Johar Village, Telaga Tujuh Village and Karang Gading Village. Then in 1995 Helvetia Village was divided into two villages, namely Manunggal and Helvetia Villages, so that the district now consists of five villages (desa), listed below with their areas and their populations at the 2010 Census and the 2020 Census, together with their official estimates of population as at mid 2024.

Kode Wilayah	Name	Area in km^{2}	Pop'n Census 2010	Pop'n Census 2020	Pop'n Estimate mid 2024
12.07.25.2001	Helvetia	9.71	16,744	20,182	18,964
12.07.25.2002	Menunggal	13.36	21,457	25,869	23,813
12.07.25.2003	Pematang Johar	18.90	14,348	17,185	17,263
12.07.25.2004	Karang Gading	66.36	5,409	6,489	6,484
12.07.25.2005	Telaga Tujuh	18.90	2,232	2,700	2,839
12.07.25	Totals	127.23	60,190	72,425	69,373

The address of the Head of District Office is "JL. VETERAN NO. 21 HELVETIA KECAMATAN LABUHAN DELI, KABUPATEN DELI SERDANG, POST CODE: 20373"
