= Medan Labuhan =

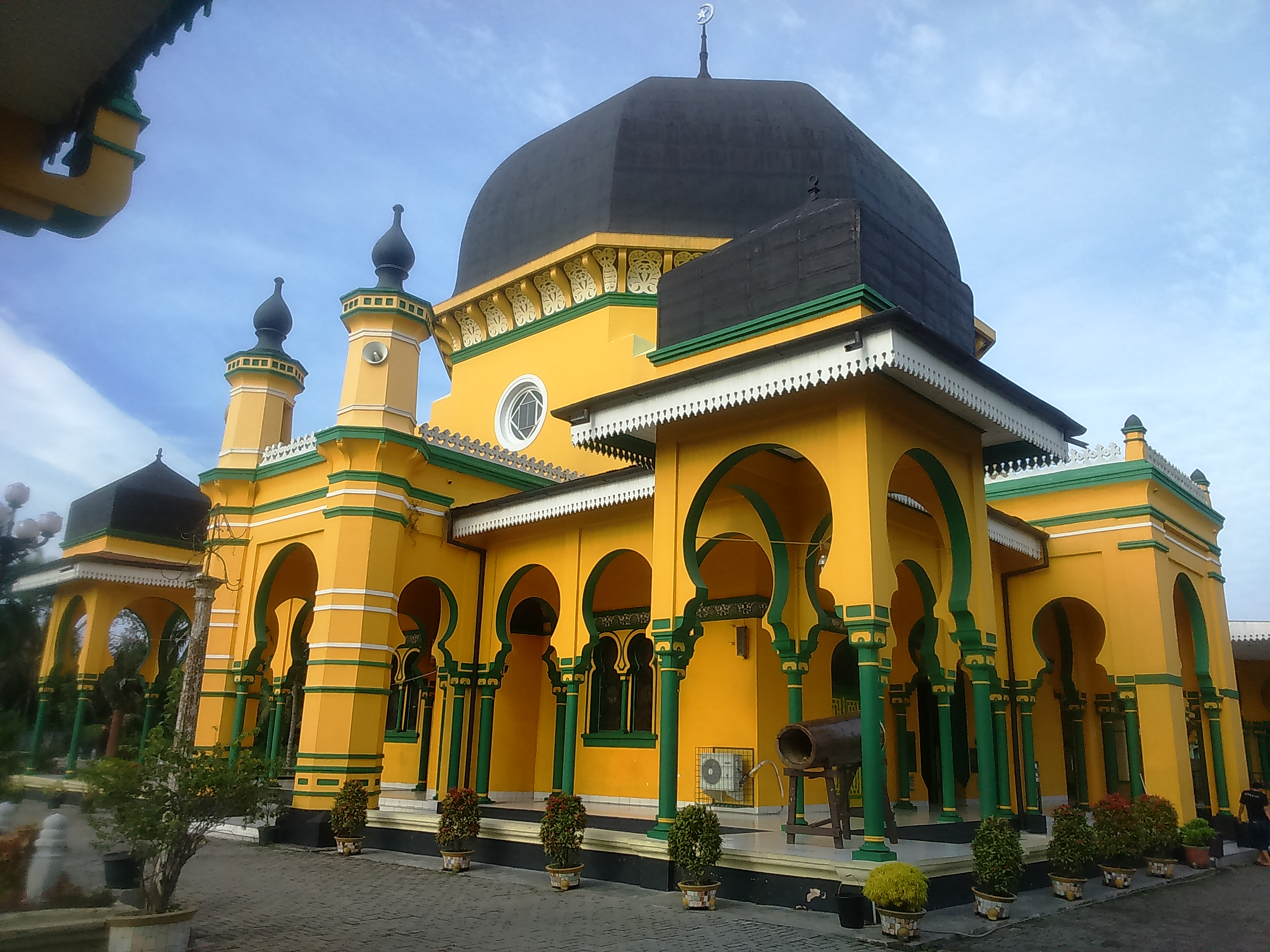
Al Osmani Mosque in Medan Labuhan

Medan Labuhan is the largest (in terms of km^{2}) of the 21 administrative districts (kecamatan) in the city of Medan, North Sumatra, Indonesia.

Boundaries of the district (Indonesian: kecamatan):

- To the north: Medan Kota Belawan
- To the south: Medan Deli
- To the west: Medan Marelan
- To the east: Deli Serdang Regency

At the 2010 Census, it had a population of 111,173 inhabitants, while at the 2020 Census this had risen to 133,765; the latest official estimate (as at mid 2023) is 140,325 (comprising 70,960 males and 69,365 females). The total area is 35.40 km^{2} and the population density in 2023 was 3,964 inhabitants/km^{2}. The district is sub-divided into six urban communities (kelurahan), listed below with their areas and their populations as at mid 2023, together with their postcodes.

Kode Wilayah	Name of kelurahan	Area in km^{2}	Pop'n Estimate mid 2023	Post code(s)
12.71.13.1001	Pekan Labuhan	2.06	23,649	20253
12.71.13.1002	Sei Mati	14.00	16,508	20252
12.71.13.1003	Besar	4.87	40,151	20251
12.71.13.1004	Martubung	4.71	18,960	20252
12.71.13.1005	Nelayan Indah	4.57	10,479	20524
12.71.13.1006	Tangkahan	5.20	30,578	20525
12.71.13	Totals	35.40	140,325	
