= Medan Marelan =

- District
- Marelan
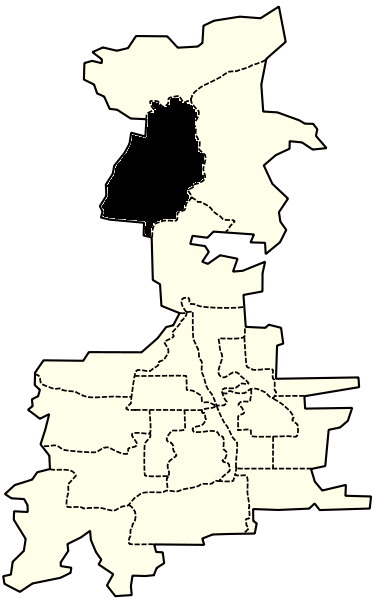
- Coordinates: 3°42′48″N 98°39′25″E
- Country: Indonesia
- Province: North Sumatra

Government
  - District Head: Muhammad Yunus, S.STP

Area
  - Total: 29.94 km^{2} (11.56 sq mi)

Population (mid 2024 estimate)
  - Total: 197,627
  - Density: 6,601/km^{2} (17,100/sq mi)
- Time zone: UTC+7 (WIB)
- Website: medanmarelan

Medan Marelan (colonial name: Maryland) (US: /ˈmɛrɪlənd/ MERR-il-ənd) (Note: In US English, the first syllable is pronounced /ˈmɛr-/ even by the minority of speakers who contrast the vowels in merry /ˈmɛri/ and Mary /ˈmɛəri/. The pronunciation /ˈmɛərɪlənd/ MAIR-il-ənd is the predominant one in British Received Pronunciation.) is one of 21 administrative districts (kecamatan) in the city of Medan, North Sumatra, Indonesia.

== History ==
In its history, Marelan was part of the Deli Sultanate, transformed into plantation land under concession rights granted by the Sultan. During this period, investors from various countries, not just the Dutch, came to Deli to establish plantations. Among these investors were individuals from the United States, Britain, Germany, Switzerland, France, Poland, the Czech Republic, and Belgium.

Initially, the main commodity cultivated was tobacco, but over time, plantations expanded to include other crops such as rubber, coffee, pepper, nutmeg, palm oil, and tea.

Some of these plantations retained local names, while others adopted foreign names. One notable plantation was Maryland, which still influences the naming of areas today. According to Dirk A. Buiskool in his article, "A Plantation City on the East Coast of Sumatra 1870–1942", Maryland was one of the plantations around Medan that bore an English name.

The name Maryland itself refers to a U.S. state that was once a British colony. This name Maryland Estate eventually inspired the modern name Marelan, cementing its historical connection to the plantation era.

The use of the name Maryland, simplified into the local language as Marelan for easier pronunciation, became the name of a district in the city of Medan starting in 1992, during the tenure of Medan Mayor Bachtiar Djafar. At that time, Medan Marelan District was established as a new district.

The legal basis for this was Government Regulation (PP) No. 35 of 1992, enacted on July 13, 1992. The regulation outlined the establishment of 18 new districts in North Sumatra Province. In the city of Medan, the newly established districts were Medan Marelan and Medan Perjuangan.

== Geography ==
Boundaries of the district (Indonesian: kecamatan):

- To the north: Medan Kota Belawan
- To the southeast: Medan Deli
- To the east: Medan Labuhan
- To the west and southwest: Deli Serdang Regency

== Demographics ==
At the 2010 Census, it had a population of 140,414 inhabitants, while at the 2020 Census, it had a population of 182,515 inhabitants; the latest official estimate (for mid 2023) is 195,737 (comprising 99,069 males and 96,668 females). The total area is 29.94 km^{2} and the population density in 2023 was 6,538 inhabitants/km^{2}. The district is sub-divided into five urban communities (kelurahan), listed below with their areas and their populations as at mid 2023, together with their postcodes.

In mid-2024, Medan Marelan District had a population of 197,627, showcasing diverse religious beliefs. The majority practiced Islam, with 178,131 people, followed by 9,313 people identifying as Christians and 8,935 as Buddhists. Catholics accounted for 1,006 people, while 188 practiced Hinduism. Additionally, 52 people identified as Confucianists, and two adhered to the traditional belief system of Kepercayaan terhadap Tuhan Yang Maha Esa (Faith in the Almighty God). This diversity reflects the harmonious coexistence of various faiths within the district.

Kode Wilayah	Name of kelurahan	Area in km^{2}	Pop'n Estimate mid 2023	Post code(s)
12.71.12.1001	Labuhan Deli	5.27	20,052	20254
12.71.12.1002	Rengas Pulau	8.61	72,593	20255
12.71.12.1003	Terjun	8.57	47,997	20256
12.71.12.1004	Tanah Enam Ratus	3.30	38,853	20245
12.71.12.1005	Paya Pasir	4.19	16,242	20250
12.71.12	Totals	29.94	195,737	

== Facilities ==
=== Education ===
No	Type Education	Information
1	Elementary School	54
2	Junior High School	15
3	Senior High School	10
4	College	1
5	University	1

=== Health ===
No.	Means	Amount
1	Hospital	3
2	Public Health Center	4
3	Clinic	18
4	Integrated Healthcare Center	9

=== Commercial ===
No	Commercial Type	Information
1	Traditional market	2
2	Plaza/Mall	2
3	Mini Market	24
4	Toyota Car Dealer	1
5	Warehousing	7

=== Drinking Water & Energy ===
No	Customer	Amount
1	Water	983
2	Electricity	25.949
3	Gas	463

=== Sport ===
No.	Means	Amount
1	Football	3
2	Volleyball	10
3	Badminton	15
4	Futsal	26

=== Industrial Company ===
No	Industry	Amount
1	Large/Medium	3
2	Small	11
3	Household Business	7

=== Finance ===
No.	Institution	Amount
1	Bank	14
2	Leasing/Finance	2
3	Foreign Exchange	0
4	Cooperative	3
5	Pawnshop	2

== Residents ==
Most residents in this district is the migrants whereas the tribal ethnic Malays Deli 30% only.
