= Deli River =

Sumatran river

Deli River Soengai Petani
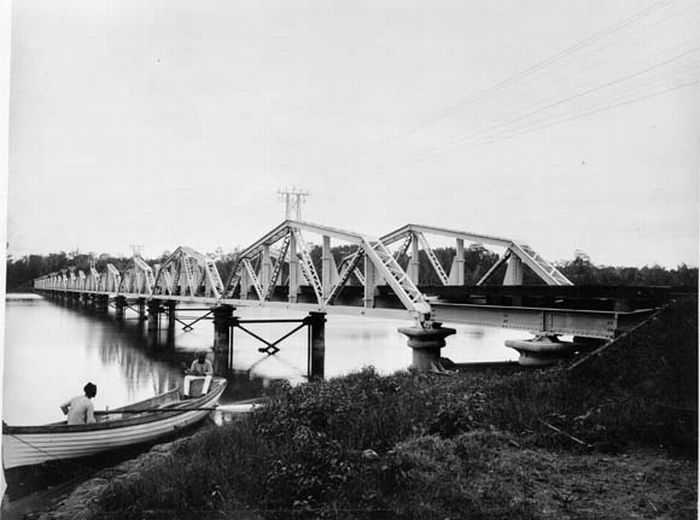
- Deli Railway Company bridge over the Deli River near Belawan

- Location of river mouth Deli River (Indonesia)
- Native name: Sungai Deli (Indonesian)

Location
- Country: Indonesia
- Province: North Sumatera

Physical characteristics
- Source: Mount Sibayak
  - location: Sibolangit
  - elevation: 2,000 m (6,600 ft)
- Mouth: Strait of Malacca
  - location: Medan Kota Belawan
  - coordinates: 3°46′1″N 98°42′9.8″E
- Length: 73 km (45 mi)
- Basin size: 346 km^{2} (134 sq mi)
- Width
  - average: 5.58 m (18.3 ft)

Basin features
- River system: Deli basin
- Population: 1,346,520 (2015)

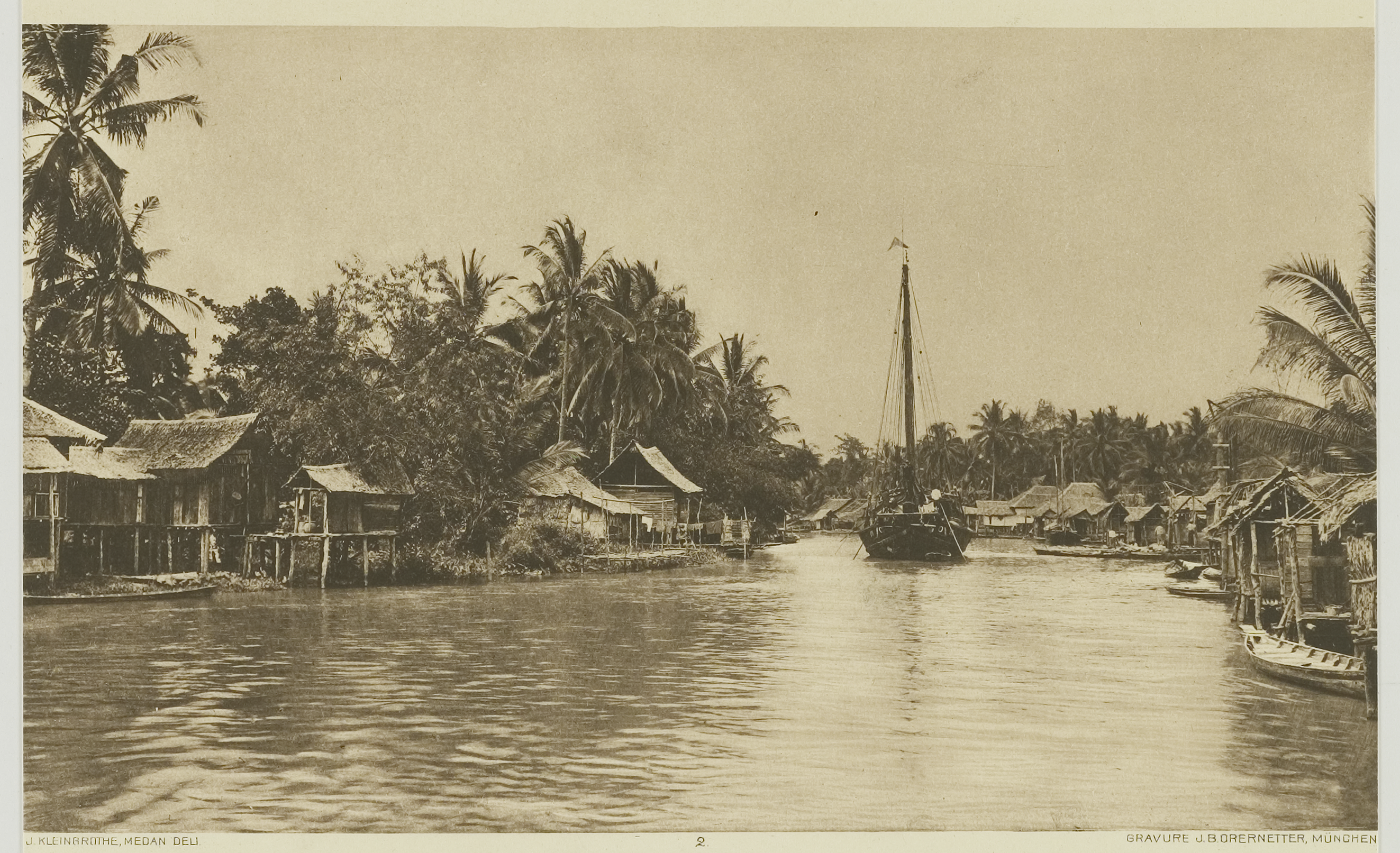
Deli River (1905)

Deli River (Indonesian: Sungai Deli) is a river located in Sumatra, Indonesia, and reaches the Malacca Strait through the northern part of the city of Medan before discharging into the Strait near the port city of Belawan. It is one of the eight rivers in the Medan area. The Deli Sultanate was founded on the delta of the river around 1640, and later around the 19th century, this river acted as an artery of trade for the sultanate to other areas.

== Hydrology ==
The forest area in the headwaters of the Deli River is 3,655 hectares, or 7.59 percent of 48 162 hectares of the Deli watershed. With an area of 48,162 hectares, a length of 73 kilometres (km), and a width of 5.58 m, the Deli watershed should have at least 14,000 hectares, or 30 percent of the watershed.

Today, the river is heavily polluted. 70 percent of waste in the Deli River are solid or liquid waste, due to waste generated in the densely populated city of Medan (reaching 1,725 tons a day).

== Geography ==
The river flows in the northeastern area of Sumatra with predominantly tropical rainforest climate (designated as Af in the Köppen-Geiger climate classification). The annual average temperature in the area is 24 °C. The warmest month is January, when the average temperature is around 26 °C, and the coldest is December, at 22 °C. The average annual rainfall is 2862 mm. The wettest month is October, with an average of 446 mm rainfall, and the driest is June, with 129 mm rainfall.

== See also ==
- List of drainage basins of Indonesia
- List of rivers of Sumatra

== Notes ==
1.Population calculated from the sum of populations in the 14 administrative districts (kecamatan) of Medan City which were used for population calculation in the citation.
