= Port of Belawan =

Port in North Sumatra, Indonesia

- Interactive map of Port of Belawan
- Location within Sumatra Location within Southeast Asia

Location
- Country: Indonesia
- Location: Medan
- Coordinates: 3°46′59″N 98°41′26″E

Details
- Operated by: Pelindo
- Owned by: Ministry of Transportation

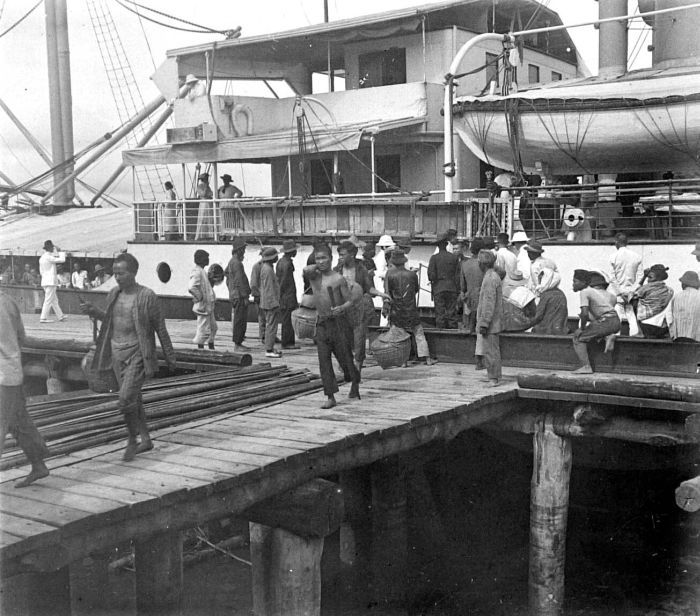
Chinese coolies from Swatow disembark at Belawan.

The Port of Belawan (Chinese: 勿老灣; Pe̍h-ōe-jī: mài lau ôan) is a harbor in Medan, North Sumatra. Located on the northeast coast of Sumatra, Belawan is Indonesia's busiest seaport outside of Java. It includes Medan Belawan District, the most northerly of the city of Medan's 21 administrative districts (kecamatan), which covers an area of 33.27 km^{2}; at the 2010 Census the district had a population of 95,506, which in the 2020 Census reached 108,987; the official estimate as at mid 2023 was 110,978 - comprising 56,718 males and 54,260 females.

There are weekly passenger ships operated by Pelni from Medan to Tanjung Balai Karimun, Batam, Riau Islands and Tanjung Priok, Jakarta.

A regular ferry service connects Belawan to across the Strait of Malacca to Penang, Malaysia; at times there was a ferry that also ran from Belawan to Phuket, Thailand and to Langkawi, Malaysia.

== History ==
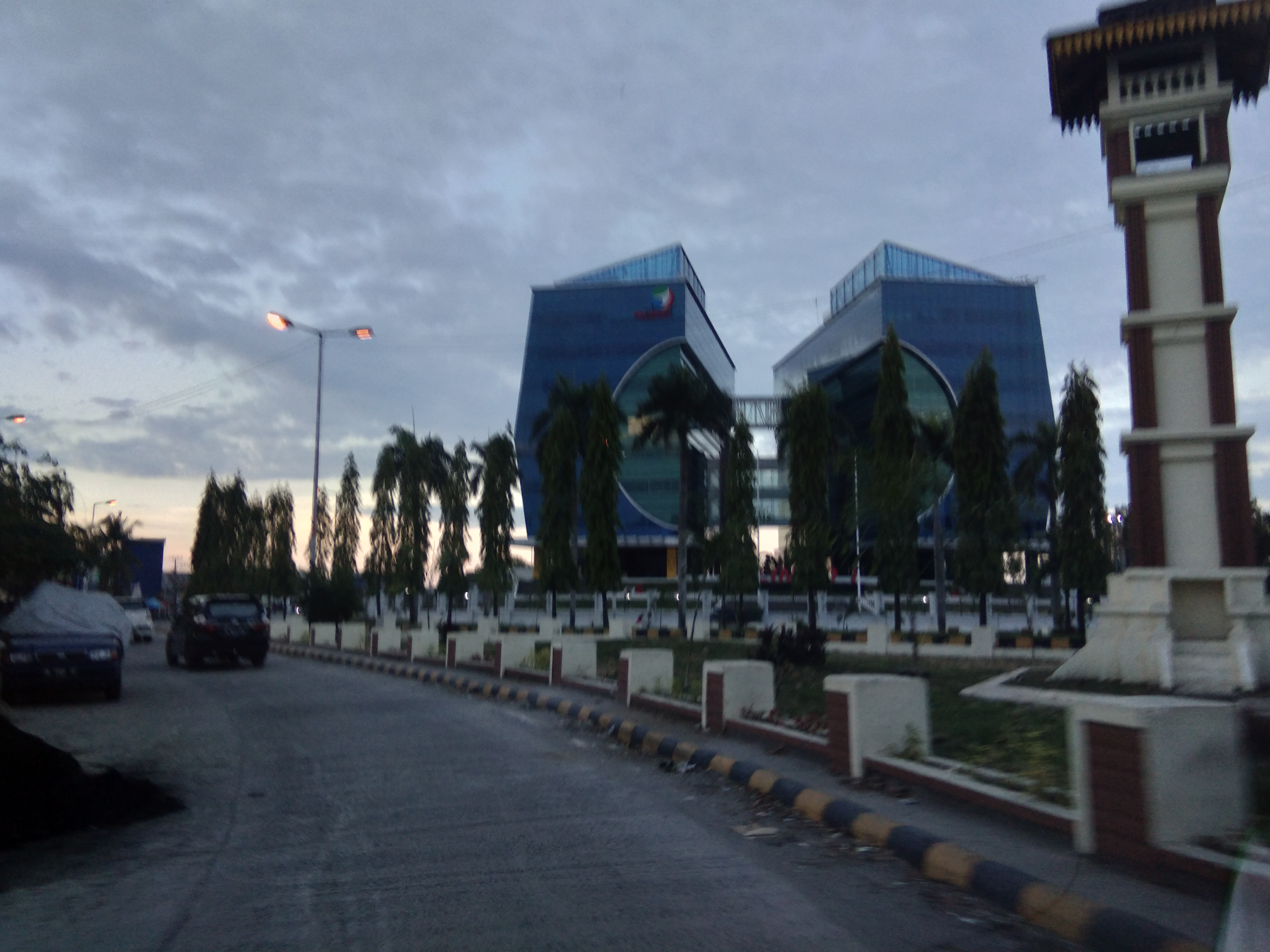
Pelindo office in the Port of Belawan, 2019

The port was initially built in 1890, to provide a location where tobacco could be transferred directly between rail lines from the interior and deep-draft ships. The harbor expanded in 1907 with the construction of a new section intended for Chinese and indigenous traders, reserving the existing port for European shipping. In the early twentieth century the port's business expanded, with the growth of major rubber and palm oil plantations in northern Sumatra. In the 1920s several major berthing facilities were built.

In 1938, the port was the largest port in the Dutch East Indies, in terms of cargo value. Cargo volumes dropped substantially after Indonesian independence, and did not reach pre-independence levels again until the mid-1960s. A major restructuring in 1985 saw the construction of a container terminal; it almost immediately captured about one-fifth of Indonesia's containerized exports. Major products exported include rubber, palm oil, tea, and coffee.

In early 2013, Belawan Port can serve 1.2 million twenty-foot equivalent units (TEUs) per year and still gradually expands to 2 million TEUs with Rp.975 billion ($89.7 million) fund.

Under a fresh agreement signed on 23 June 2023, the Dubai-based multinational logistics company DP World is set to commence operations at Indonesia’s Belawan New Container Terminal (BNCT) which will greatly expand the port's capacity, after finalising an agreement with the Indonesia Investment Authority (INA) and port operator Pelindo to manage the terminal and begin a major expansion.
