= Inti Indorayon Utama =

Indonesian paper milling company

- Founded: 1989 in Sumatra, Indonesia
- Founder: Sukanto Tanoto
- Area served: 70% export and 30% domestic
- Production output: 240,000 ton pulp/year (since 1989), 60,000 ton rayon/year (since 1993)
- Owner: Asia Pacific Resources International Holdings (APRIL) (60% owned by RGM International)
- Footnotes / references Source: WALHI

PT Inti Indorayon Utama is an Indonesian paper milling company founded in Sumatra, Indonesia, in 1989 and is owned by Indonesia's richest business man Sukanto Tanoto.

== History ==
In 1989, Sukanto Tanoto started a pulp mill under the name of PT Inti Indorayon Utama, which was built at a small village Porsea nearby Lake Toba of North Sumatra. The mill however did not run smoothly with the local people, who argued that it had polluted the area, performed major deforestation and injustice land grabbing. From the beginning, the Indonesia's first pulp mill was full of conflict history. The initial permit released contained land disputes, the quality of air and water around Asahan River degraded drastically, which was said to be responsible to certain skin diseases, reducing corp production and water contamination, was responsible for some landslide disasters in the area and released toxic chlorine gas during the 1993 boiler explosion. However, during the Suharto administration, Indorayon enjoyed freedom of its activities due to the close ties between its owner with Suharto. Demonstrations and legal action to the governmental agencies, that had started since 1986, failed to stop the factory's activities which in turn was answered by detentions, arrests, beatings, raids and violent acts by the local security forces.

Following the downfall of Suharto in 1998, public pressure began to grow, but it was always answered with violence and terrors by police officers hired by the company. Clashes between local residents, staffs and members of security forces were unavoidable and resulted six deaths and hundreds of injuries in 1999. As a result, President Habibie temporarily put the mill on halt on 19 March 1999 and designated an independent audit to assess the environmental damage caused by the mill, the audit of which never took place. The decision was later supported by the-then Indonesia minister of environment Sony Keraf from the President Wahid's administration that the Indorayon's paper pulp and rayon fibre production should be closed down or relocated.

Several Indorayon's supporters, including the-then ministry of trade Jusuf Kalla, denied the allegation over the mill's pollution case and lobbied heavily to resume its operation. The problem also escalated into an international matter as Indorayon was 86% owned by foreign individuals. An international arbitration in Washington was then opened and President Wahid stated that Indonesia must abide the arbitration decision. Having feared of US$600 million compensation or facing international lawsuit, the Indonesia cabinet minister gave a 'green light' for the mill to resume its operation in May 2000 with the requirement that the production of dissolving pulp should be stopped. The decision was then responded by another opposition from the local people and some Indonesia's environmental groups such as WALHI. A student was shot dead by the police during the demonstration on 21 June 2000, dozens have been killed and many hundreds were seriously injured during the 27 months of conflict.

The long saga between Tanoto's Indorayon with local community ended up with the status of closing down during the President Wahid administration. Stakeholders stopped making monthly US$1 million operational payments since 1 September 2000. The company had tried to rename into PT Toba Pulp Lestari to ensure the local people that it does not produce rayon (dissolving pulp) anymore, but it still failed to resume its operation due to intense local opposition. The company laid off its 7,000 workforce within weeks and agreed on US$400 million debt for equity swap.

== See also ==
- Environmental issues in Indonesia
