= Medan =

Capital and largest city of North Sumatra, Indonesia

- City

Regional transcription(s)
  - Batak: ᯔᯩᯑᯉ᯳
  - Jawi: ميدن
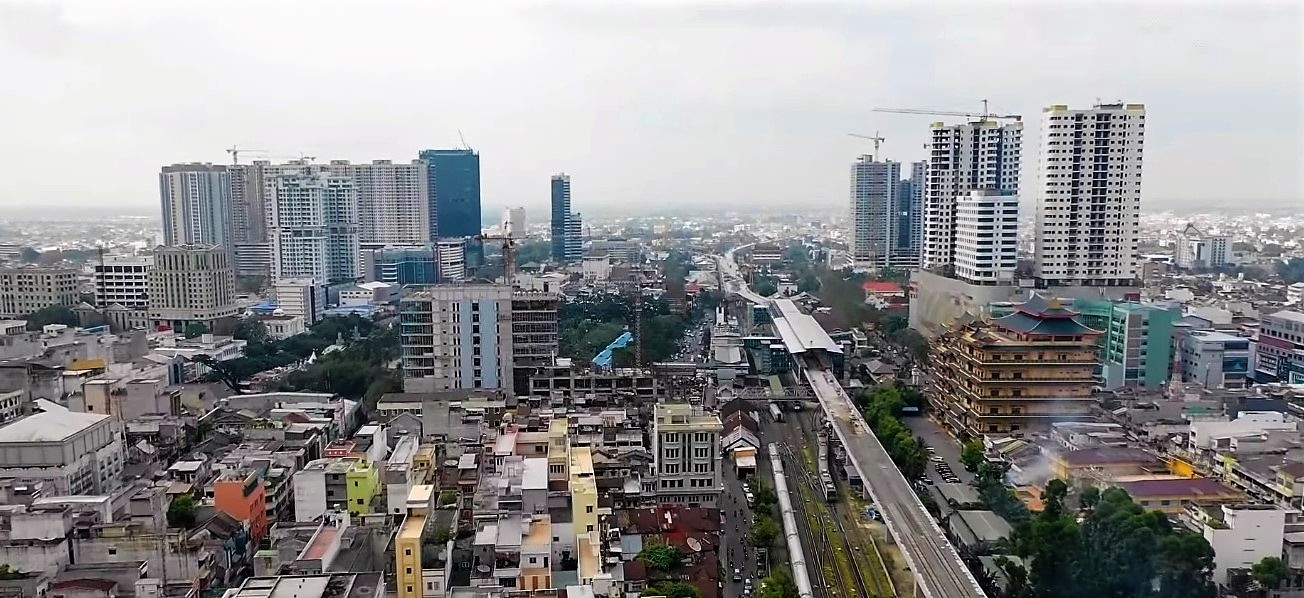
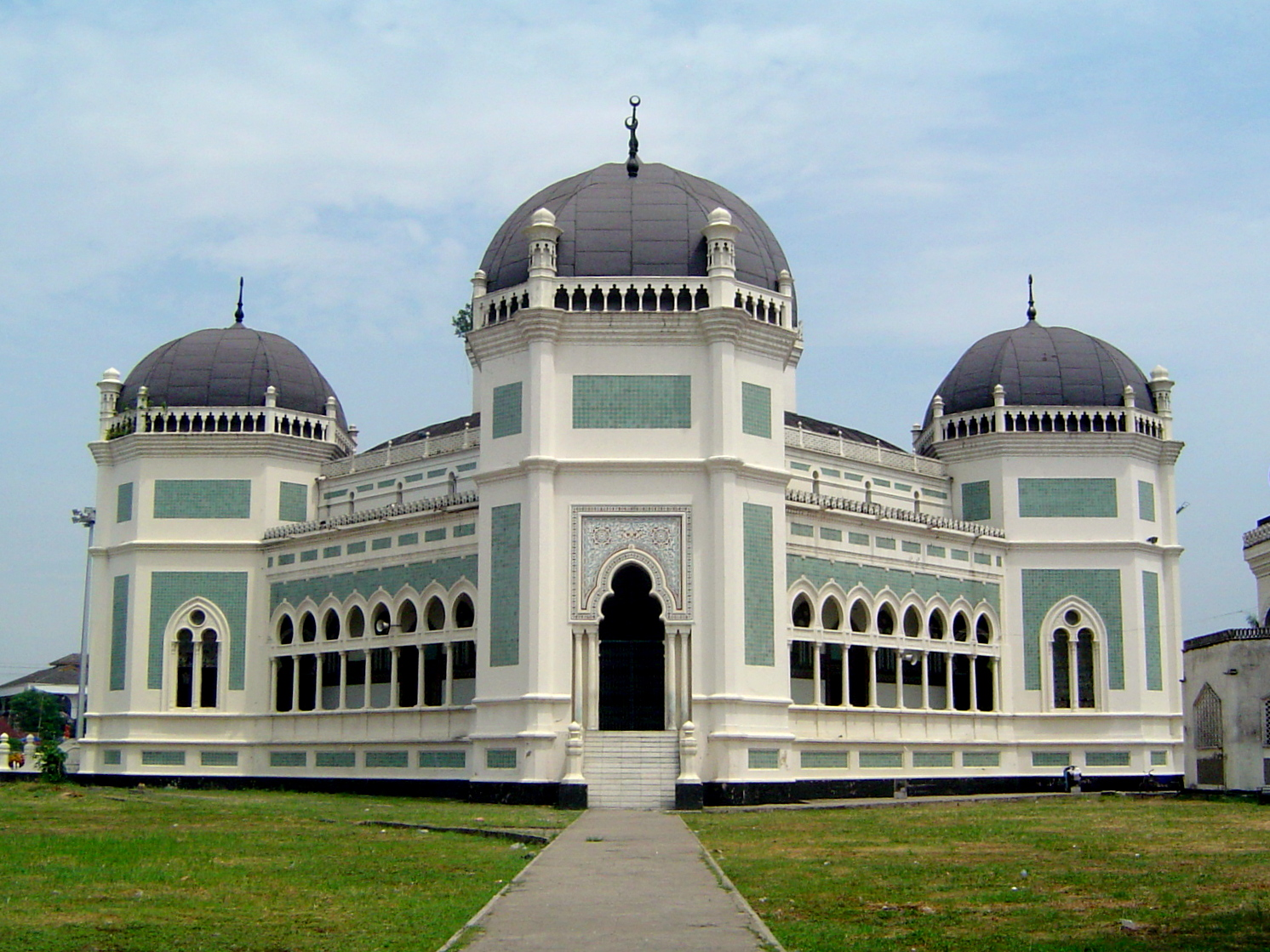
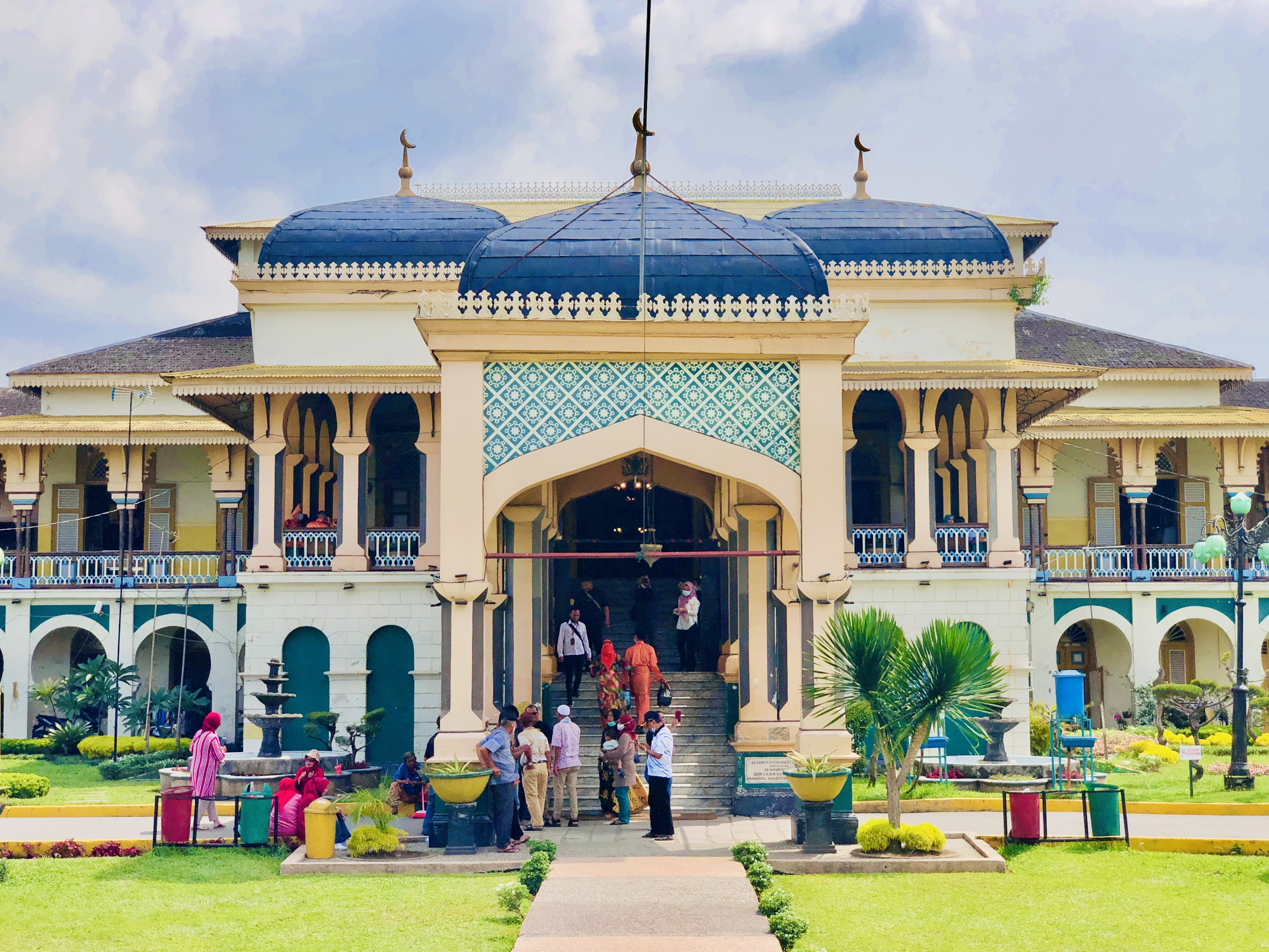
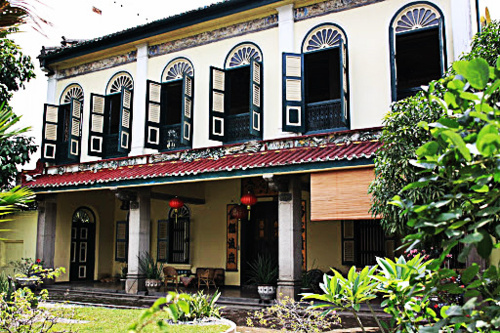
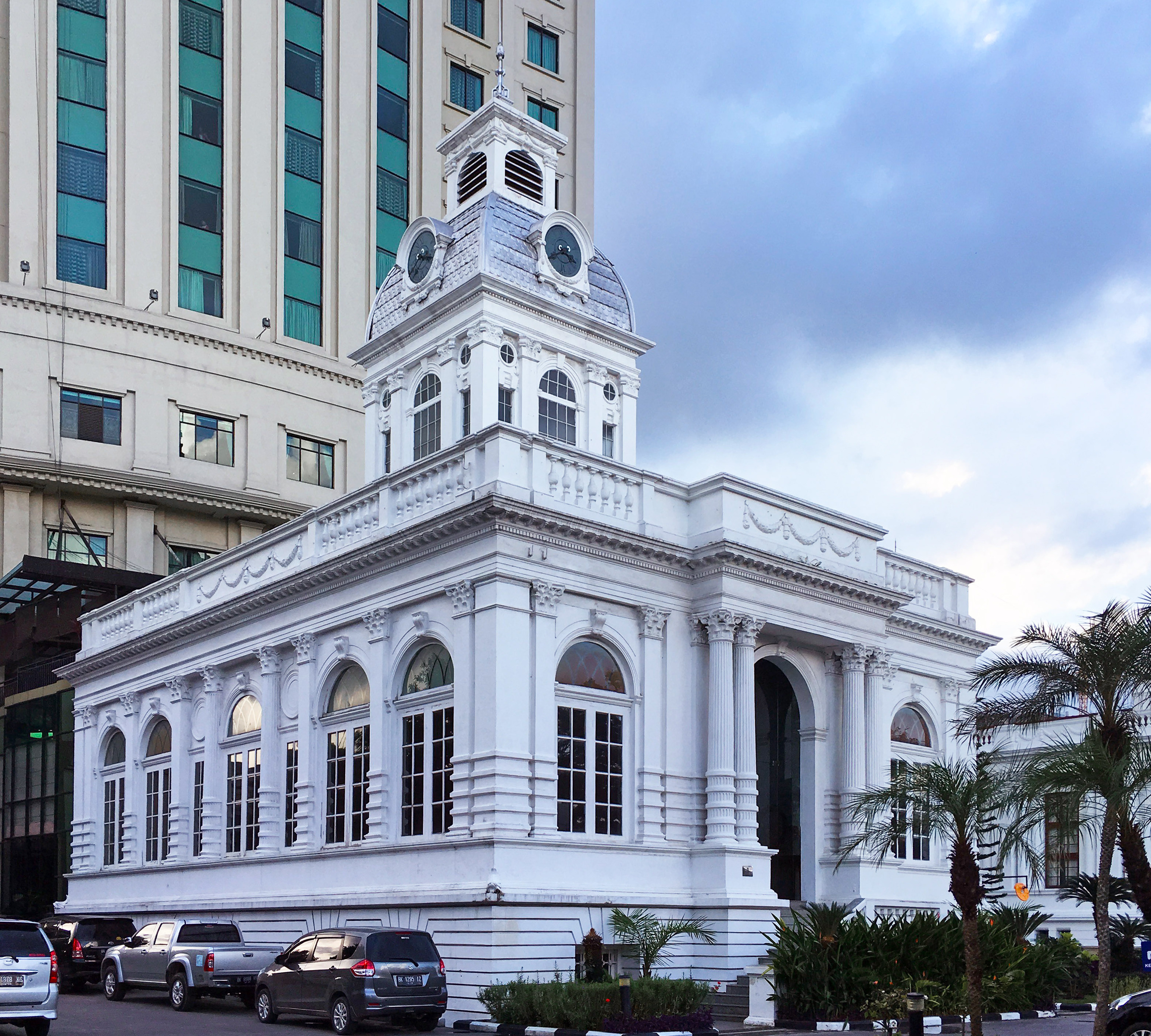
- Skyline of Medan Al-Mashun Grand Mosque Maimun Palace Tjong A Fie Mansion Old City Hall

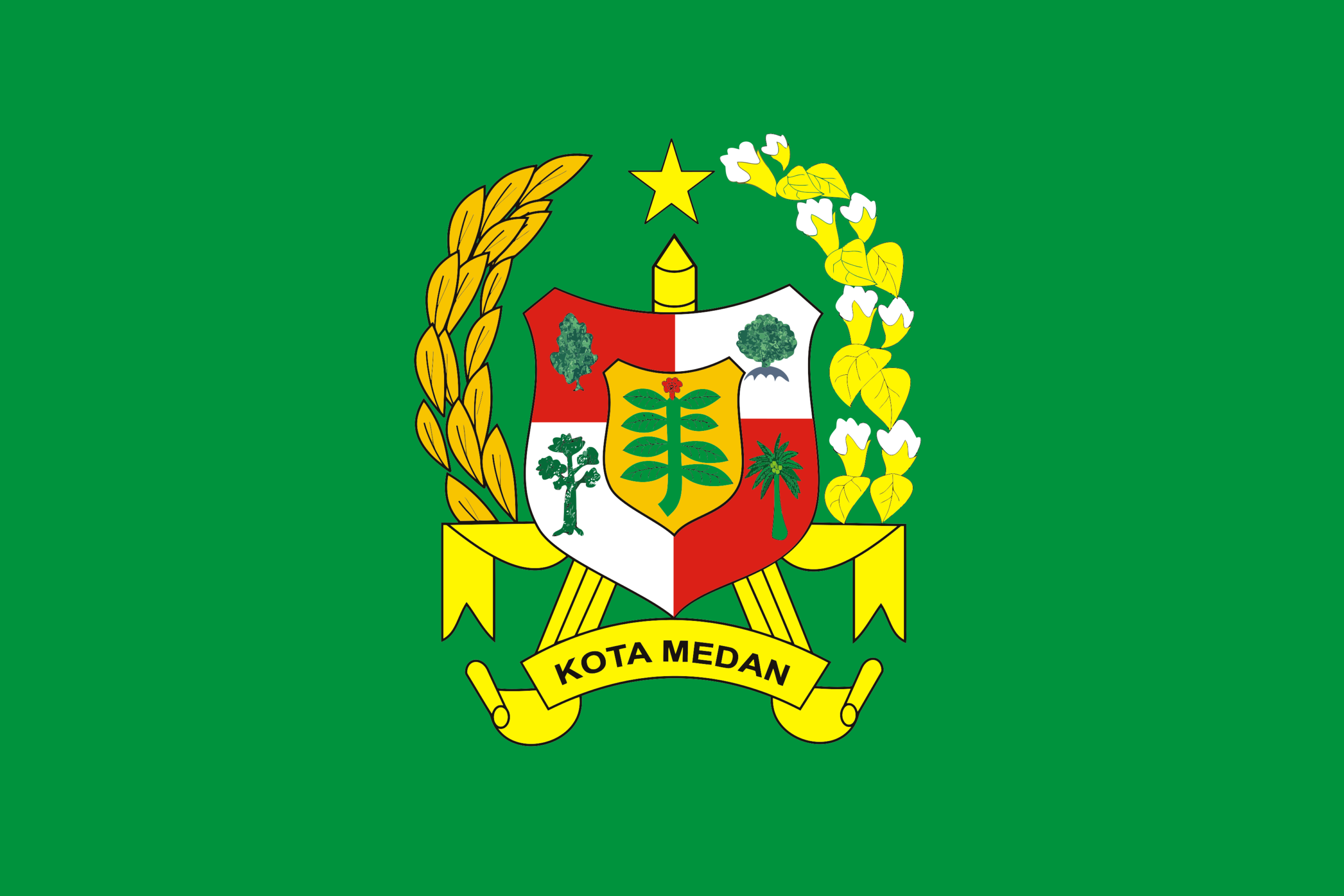
- Flag Coat of arms
- Nickname: Parijs van Sumatra (Dutch) "Paris of Sumatra"
- Motto(s): Bekerja sama dan sama-sama bekerja "Collaborate and Everybody work"
- Location within North Sumatra
- Interactive map of Medan
- Location in Sumatra and Indonesia Medan (Indonesia)
- Coordinates: 03°35′22″N 98°40′26″E
- Country: Indonesia
- Province: North Sumatra
- Metropolitan area: Mebidangro
- Founded: 1 July 1590

Government
  - Type: Mayor–council
  - Body: Medan City Government
  - Mayor: Rico Waas (NasDem)
  - Vice Mayor: Zakiyuddin Harahap
  - Legislature: Medan City Regional House of Representatives (DPRD)

Area
  - City: 265.1 km^{2} (102.4 sq mi)
  - Metro: 3,094.85 km^{2} (1,194.93 sq mi)
- Elevation: 2.5–37.5 m (8.2–123.0 ft)

Population (2024 estimate)
  - City: 2,486,283
  - Rank: 5th
  - Density: 9,379/km^{2} (24,290/sq mi)
  - Metro: 4,944,979
  - Metro density: 1,598/km^{2} (4,140/sq mi)
- Demonym: Medanese

Nominal GDP (nominal, 2023)
  - Total: Rp 303.312 trillion US$ 19.899 billion
  - Per capita: Rp 105.908 million US$ 8,843
- Time zone: UTC+7 (IWST)
- Area code: (+62) 61
- Vehicle registration: BK
- HDI (2023): ▲0.826 (26th) – very high
- Website: medan.go.id

Medan (/mɛˈdɑːn/ meh-DAHN, Indonesian: [ˈmɛdan], Batak: ᯔᯩᯑᯉ᯳) is the capital and largest city of the Indonesian province of North Sumatra. The nearby Strait of Malacca, Port of Belawan, and Kualanamu International Airport make Medan a regional hub and multicultural metropolis, acting as a financial centre for Sumatra and a gateway to the western part of Indonesia. About 60% of the economy in North Sumatra is backed by trading, agriculture, and processing industries, including exports from its 4 million acres of palm oil plantations. The National Development Planning Agency listed Medan as one of the four main central cities in Indonesia, alongside Jakarta, Surabaya, and Makassar. In terms of population, it is the most populous city in Indonesia outside of the island of Java. Its population, as of 2024, is approximately equal to the country of Moldova.

As of the 2020 Census, Medan had a population of 2,435,252 within its city limits; the official population estimate as of mid 2024 was 2,486,283 - comprising 1,237,602 males and 1,248,681 females - and projected to rise to 2,498,293 at mid 2025. When the surrounding urban area is included, the population is over 3.4 million, making it the fourth largest urban area in Indonesia. The Medan metropolitan area—which includes neighbouring Binjai, Deli Serdang Regency, and a part of Karo Regency—is the largest metropolitan area outside of Java, with 4,744,323 residents counted in the 2020 Census, rising to 4,944,979 in mid 2024.

The city was founded at the confluence of the Deli River and the Babura river by a Karonese man named Guru Patimpus. Then called Kampung Medan Putri, it became part of the Deli Sultanate, established in 1632. In the late 19th century, colonial Dutch seeking new plantation areas chose Medan and Deli as plantation hubs to found the Deli Company. Within a few years, the Dutch tobacco trade transformed Medan into an economic hub, earning it the nickname Het Land Dollar ("the land of the money"). The Deli Railway, established to ship tobacco, rubber, tea, timber, palm oil, and sugar from Medan to the Port of Belawan for worldwide export, brought further rapid development to Medan. The city became first the capital of the State of East Sumatra, and then the provincial capital of North Sumatra.

== Etymology ==
The term medan might be derived from the Batak Karo word madan (ᯔᯑᯉ᯳), which literally means 'healed', 'blessed', or 'recovered'. The term is associated with the historical Karo figure and founder of the city, traditional doctor Guru Patimpus. The oldest evidence of this term used to refer to the city dates back to c. 13th-15th century during the reign of Aru, the Karo monarch.

Another popular theory suggests that medan is of Malay origin, literally meaning 'field'. The term medan (مدان) in Malay might be derived from the Tamil word maitāṉ-am (மைதானம், 'ground'), which is cognate with the Malayalam word maitānam (മൈതാനം), or from meidan (میدان), Persian term for "field" or "ground".

== History ==
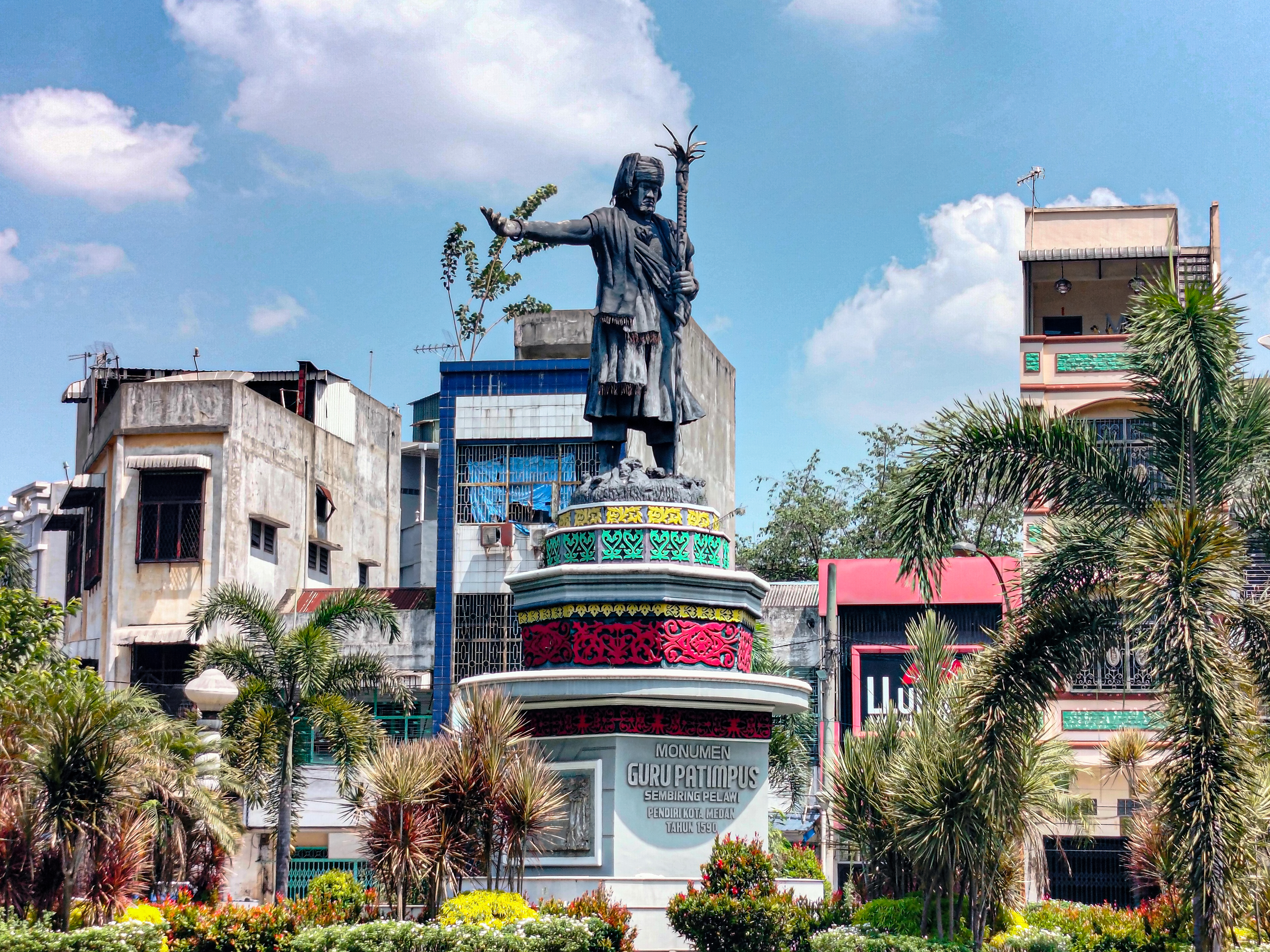
Guru Patimpus, the founder of Medan

Medan is located in what was once the Kingdom of Aru, founded by the Karo people and flourishing between the 13th and 16th centuries. A number of archaeological sites survive near Medan, including Kota Rentang, a port settlement in the Hamparan Perak area; Kota Cina, an ancient trading site in Medan Marelan; and Benteng Putri Hijau, a fort ruin in Deli Tua.

In the sixteenth century, Guru Patimpus Sembiring Pelawi, a Karonese man from the Karo Regency, converted from Pemena to Islam. While traveling to study under Datuk Kota Bangun, Guru Patimpus met and married the Princess of Pulo Brayan. Accompanied by their two sons, Kolok and Kecik, the couple founded Medan village between the Deli and Babura Rivers.

In 1632, the Aceh Sultanate under Gocah Pahlawan expanded to include Medan. Perunggit succeeded his father in 1669, and declared the Deli Sultanate, including Medan, independent of the Aceh Sultanate.

1886 coat of arms of Medan, showing a tobacco plant as the charge

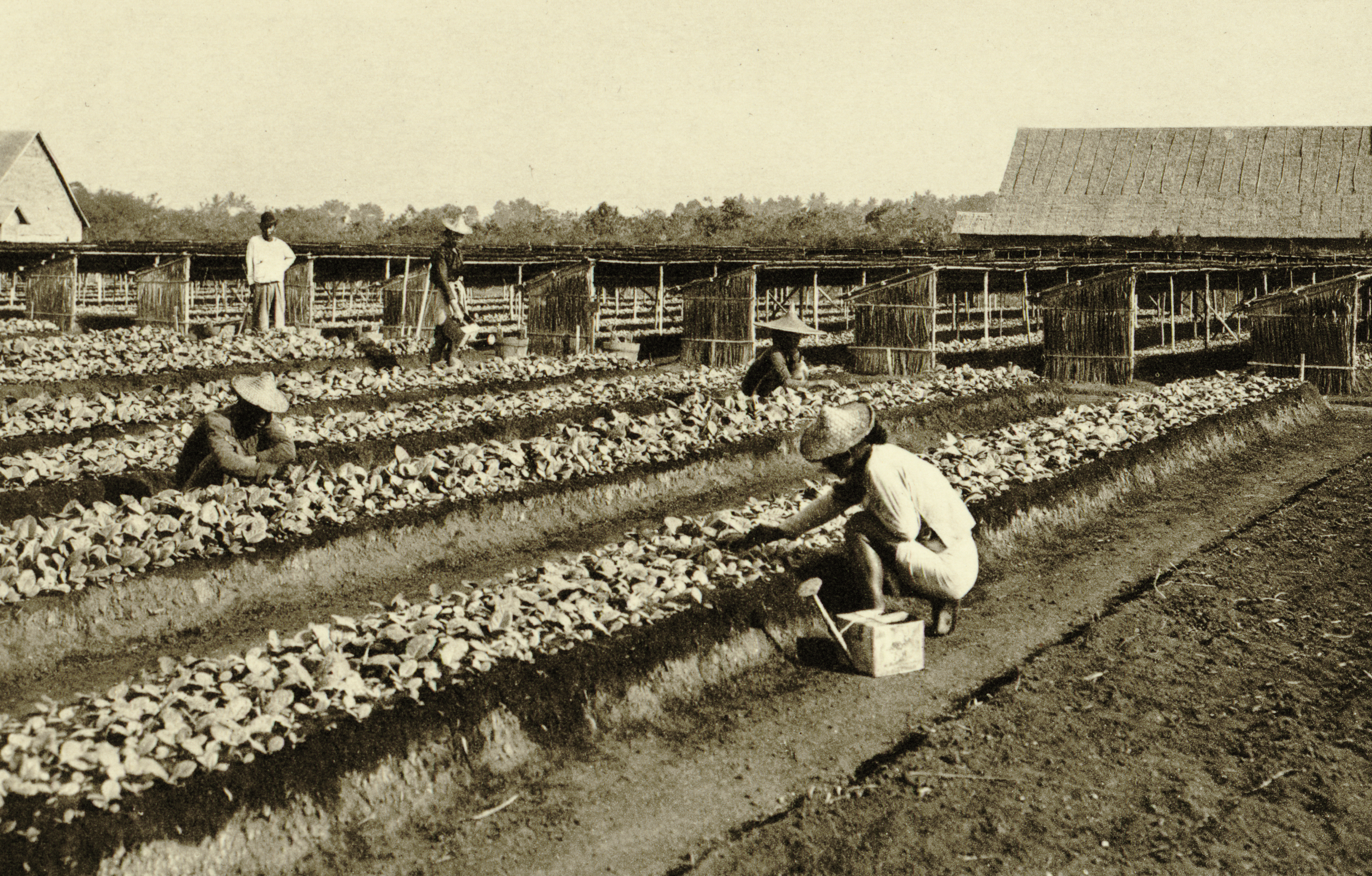
Coolies working in the seedbeds on a tobacco plantation in Medan, c. 1900

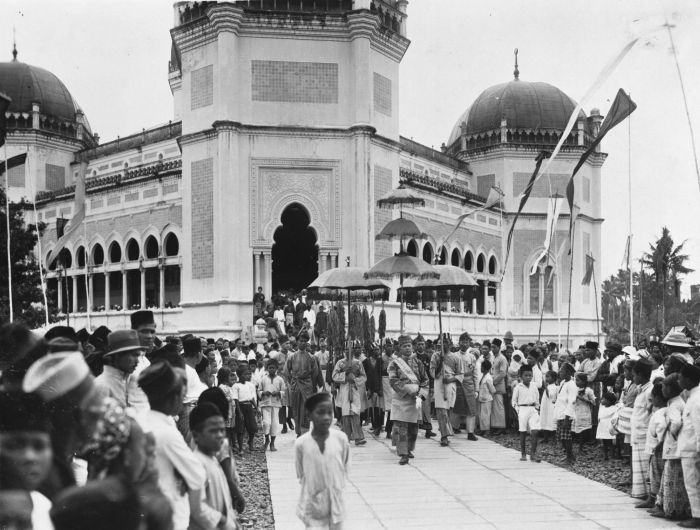
Sultan Amaluddin leaving the Great Mosque on his coronation day

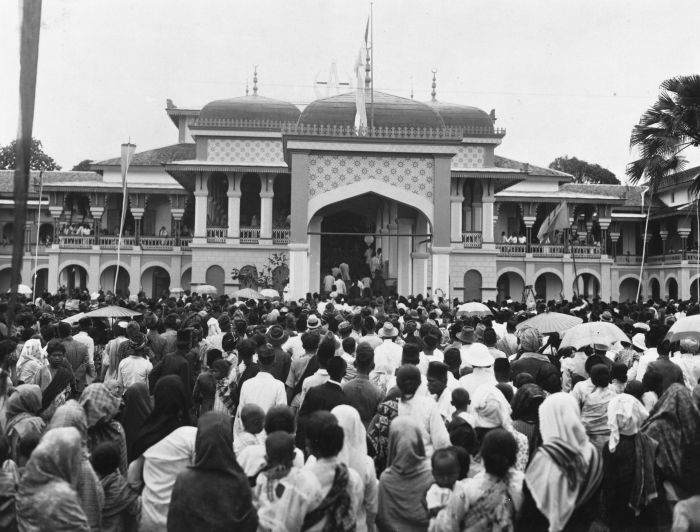
Crowd in front of Maimun Palace

Starting in the 1860s, Dutch authorities began to release new land for tobacco plantations. Said Abdullah Bilsagih, brother-in-law of the Deli Sultan Mahmud Perkasa Alam, persuaded Dutch tobacco merchant Jacob Nienhuys to move his business from Java to Deli. Dutch merchants Van der Falk and Elliot, and Chinese brothers Tjong Yong Hian and Tjong A Fie, were also pioneers of Deli's tobacco industry. In 1867, Nienhuys, Jannsen, P.W. Clemen, and Cremer founded De Deli Maatschappij; in 1869, they moved its head office from Labuhan Deli to Medan. This made Medan a centre of the tobacco trade, which continued to grow with the 1869 opening of the Suez Canal.

Sultan Ma'mun Al Rashid Perkasa Alamyah, who ruled from 1873 to 1924, moved the kingdom's capital to Medan. He became known as the builder of early Medan, finishing the construction of the Maimun Palace in 1888 and building the Great Mosque of Medan in 1907. In 1898, a Dutch businessman named Aeint Herman de Boer built Hotel de Boer to accommodate the cruise ships of European tourists which had begun to visit Medan.

During the 1942 Dutch East Indies campaign, the Japanese entered Medan on bicycles and occupied the city. The handover of power was chaotic, but through the use of the Kempetai. Locals of Medan were subjected to enforced Japanese language and worship. The Japanese were able to hold the city until their surrender in 1945. Following that, Medan came under the authority of the South East Asia Command led by British Admiral Lord Louis Mountbatten. With the Proclamation of Indonesian Independence on 17 August, Medan became part of the newly-independent Republic of Indonesia, news announced in Medan on 30 September.

In October, Allied troops landed in Belawan and marched on Medan. The subsequent conflicts between the Allies and the Indonesian Army became known as the Battle of Medan. The Allies regained control of Medan in April 1946, and in December 1947 the Dutch established the State of East Sumatra with Medan as its capital. This became part of the United States of Indonesia in 1949, and was dissolved into the Republic of Indonesia in 1950.

Medan continued to grow as a centre of commerce during the reign of Amaluddin Al Sani Perkasa Alamsyah. Developments of the 1970s, especially palm oil and rubber plantations, made Medan the busiest city outside Java, with the transmigration program bringing many Javanese and Batak migrants.

In May 1998, months of student demonstrations in Medan over the 1997 Asian financial crisis turned into riots when a student was killed in a clash with security forces. The next day, the mobs became bigger, and many shops and vehicles in the business district (mostly owned by Chinese residents) were burned and looted. As a result, a curfew was imposed for more than two weeks until peace returned.

On 5 September 2005, Mandala Airlines Flight 091 stalled a minute after taking off from Medan's old Polonia International Airport for a flight to Jakarta. The aircraft crashed into a heavily populated residential area along Djamin Ginting road in Padang Bulan. Of the 117 passengers and crews on board, only 17 survived, and an additional 49 civilians on the ground were killed. As a result, Kualanamu International Airport was built in Deli Serdang to replace the old airport, with construction finished in 2012. After the move to the new airport, height restriction laws in Medan were relaxed.

== Geography ==
Medan is in the northeastern part of Sumatra island, in the province of North Sumatra. The city is a semi-enclave within Deli Serdang Regency, bordered by that regency on three sides and by the Strait of Malacca to the north. The natural harbor formed where the Deli and Babura rivers feed into the straits has contributed to Medan's growth as a trading port.

Medan's elevation varies between 2.5 and 37.5 m (8 ft 2 in and 123 ft 0 in) above sea level, with the Barisan Mountains to the south, and volcanoes such as Sibayak Mountain and Sinabung Mountain 50 to 70 km (31 to 43 mi) from the city.

=== Climate ===
Medan features a tropical rainforest climate (Köppen: Af) with no real dry season. Its driest month (January) on average sees about one-third the precipitation of its wettest month (October), with a total annual precipitation of about 2,200 mm (87 in). Autumn (September - November) is the rainiest season, and the temperature is still coolest in winter (December and January). Temperatures in the city average approximately 27 °C (81 °F) throughout the year.

Climate data for Medan (Kualanamu International Airport) (1991–2020 normals)
Month	Jan	Feb	Mar	Apr	May	Jun	Jul	Aug	Sep	Oct	Nov	Dec	Year
Mean daily maximum °C (°F)	31.2 (88.2)	32.0 (89.6)	32.7 (90.9)	32.8 (91.0)	32.8 (91.0)	32.9 (91.2)	32.7 (90.9)	32.4 (90.3)	31.9 (89.4)	31.4 (88.5)	31.1 (88.0)	30.7 (87.3)	32.1 (89.7)
Daily mean °C (°F)	26.7 (80.1)	27.1 (80.8)	27.7 (81.9)	27.8 (82.0)	28.0 (82.4)	27.8 (82.0)	27.5 (81.5)	27.3 (81.1)	26.9 (80.4)	26.8 (80.2)	26.8 (80.2)	26.5 (79.7)	27.2 (81.0)
Mean daily minimum °C (°F)	23.4 (74.1)	23.5 (74.3)	23.8 (74.8)	24.1 (75.4)	24.4 (75.9)	24.0 (75.2)	23.6 (74.5)	23.7 (74.7)	23.5 (74.3)	23.7 (74.7)	23.7 (74.7)	23.6 (74.5)	23.8 (74.8)
Average precipitation mm (inches)	132.3 (5.21)	87.6 (3.45)	130.1 (5.12)	140.4 (5.53)	205.6 (8.09)	151.3 (5.96)	146.3 (5.76)	213.1 (8.39)	297.0 (11.69)	291.1 (11.46)	212.8 (8.38)	227.8 (8.97)	2,235.4 (88.01)
Average precipitation days	10.8	7.3	8.6	9.5	12.7	9.7	9.8	12.6	16.1	17.2	15.5	14.6	144.4
Source 1: Starlings Roost Weather
Source 2: Worldwide Bioclimatic Classification System (extremes)

== Government ==
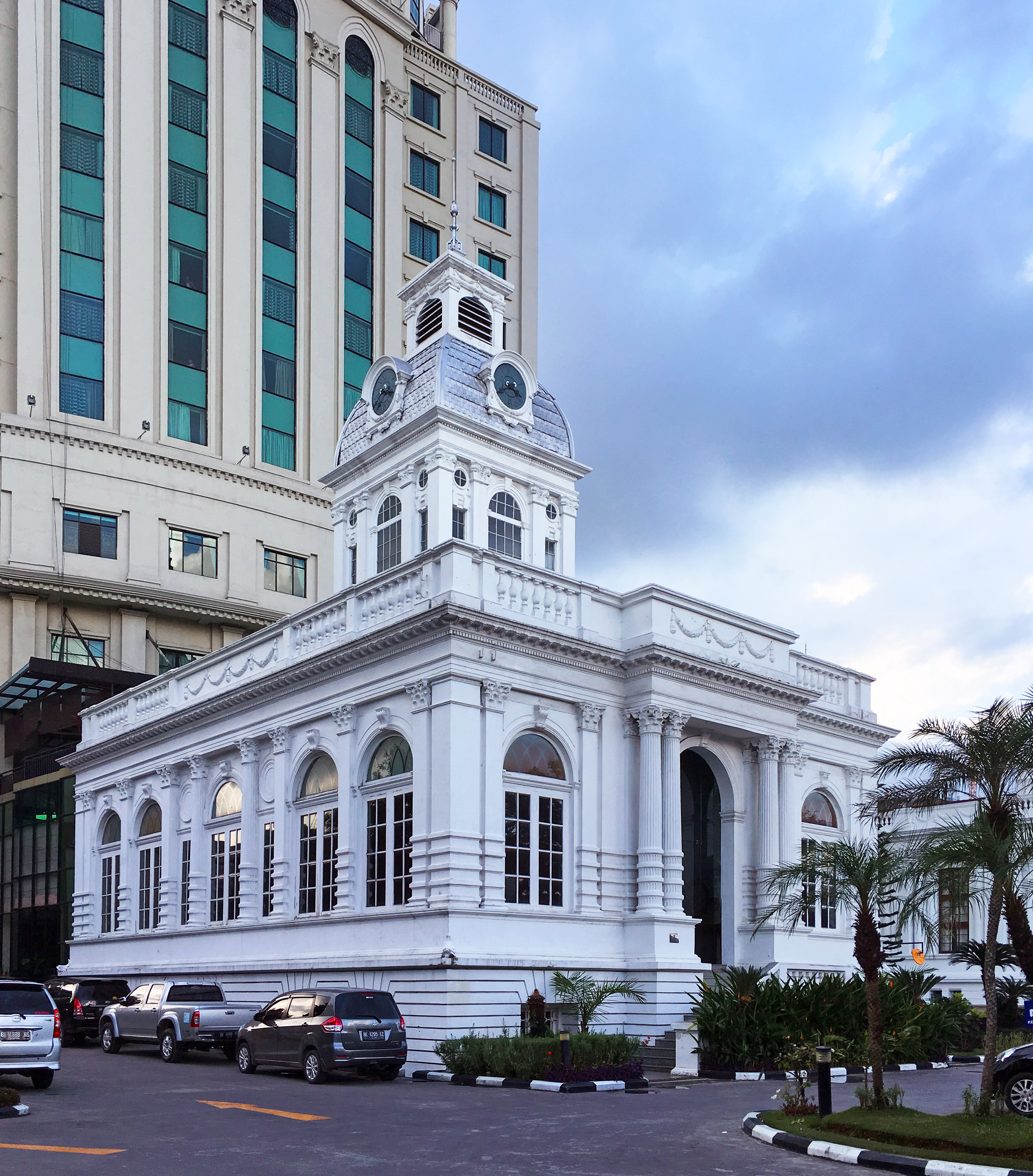
The former Medan City Hall

Medan was governed by Abdillah from 2000 until 2008, when he and his vice mayor were caught by the Corruption Eradication Commission. Syamsul Arifin, the governor of North Sumatra Province, appointed Affifudin Lubis as acting mayor, followed by Rahudman Harahap after Lubis's 2009 resignation. Harahap resigned in order to run for office in the 2010 mayoral election, leaving Arifin himself to become acting mayor. In 2013, Harahap was also arrested for corruption, and his deputy Dzulmi Eldin became acting mayor.

Dzulmi Eldin was elected mayor in 2016, and served until his arrest for corruption in 2019. He was replaced by his vice mayor, Akhyar Nasution, who served until the end of his term in 2021.

The current mayor of Medan is Bobby Nasution, with vice mayor Aulia Rachman.

=== Administrative divisions ===
District divisions of Medan

Medan is divided into 21 districts (Indonesian: kecamatan), tabulated below with their areas and populations at the 2010 Census, and the 2020 Census, together with the official estimates as of mid-2024. The table also includes the number of urban villages/neighbourhoods (Indonesian: kelurahan) in each district, and their postal codes.

Kode Wilayah	Name of District (kecamatan)	Area in km^{2}	Pop'n Census 2010	Pop'n Census 2020	Pop'n Estimate mid 2024	No. of villages	Postal codes
12.71.07	Medan Tuntungan	25.16	80,942	97,249	101,069	9	20134-20141
12.71.11	Medan Johor	16.73	123,851	151,756	155,854	6	20142-20146
12.71.09	Medan Amplas	10.65	113,143	129,726	132,403	7	20147-20149, 20219 & 20229
12.71.04	Medan Denai	9.37	141,395	169,643	172,581	6	20226-20228
12.71.10	Medan Area	4.24	96,544	117,029	118,352	12	20211-20217
12.71.01	Medan Kota	5.75	72,580	84,666	84,779	12	20211-20219
12.71.15	Medan Maimun	3.02	39,581	49,231	49,847	6	20151-20159
12.71.16	Medan Polonia	8.77	52,794	59,915	60,910	5	20152-20157
12.71.17	Medan Baru	5.43	39,516	36,522	36,066	6	20153-20156
12.71.21	Medan Selayang	16.45	98,317	103,176	104,428	6	20131-20133
12.71.02	Medan Sunggal	13.26	112,744	129,063	134,650	6	20121-20128
12.71.03	Medan Helvetia	13.05	144,257	164,910	169,363	7	20123-20126
12.71.19	Medan Petisah	5.28	61,749	71,844	72,599	7	20112-20119
12.71.05	Medan Barat	6.34	70,771	88,602	89,427	6	20111-20117
12.71.20	Medan Timur	8.89	108,633	116,985	117,002	11	20231-20239
12.71.18	Medan Perjuangan	4.54	93,328	103,813	105,778	9	20232-20237
12.71.14	Medan Tembung	7.85	133,579	146,534	150,135	7	20221-20225
12.71.06	Medan Deli	18.83	166,793	189,321	192,476	6	20241-20244
12.71.13	Medan Labuhan	35.09	111,173	133,765	136,190	6	20251-20254, 20524 & 20525
12.71.12	Medan Marelan	30.03	140,414	182,515	191,765	5	20250-20256
12.71.08	Medan Kota Belawan	33.27	95,506	108,987	110,612	6	20411-20415
	Totals	281.99	2,097,610	2,435,252	2,486,283	151	

The city centre consists of Medan Petisah, Medan Baru, Medan Polonia, Medan Maimun, Medan Kota, and Medan Barat (West Medan). Medan Labuhan is one of the largest districts by area (together with Medan Kota Belawan and Medan Marelan) and lies in the northern part of the city (Medan Kota Belawan is the northernmost city district, adjacent to the Malacca Strait, and separated by one of the outlets of the Deli River from the rest of the city). Medan Tuntungan serves as the gateway to Karo Regency, Medan Helvetia to Binjai City and Langkat, and Medan Amplas to Tebing Tinggi and Pematang Siantar.

== Demographics ==
Medan is Indonesia's largest city outside Java, and its fourth largest altogether (after Jakarta, Surabaya and Bandung). The population more than quadrupled in less than fifty years, growing from 568,000 in 1968 to 2.1 million in 2010 and to 2.5 million in 2025. As of 2020, the larger metropolitan area had a population of 4,756,863, rising to 4,944,979 in mid 2024.

Administrative division	Area in km^{2}	Pop'n Census 2010	Pop'n Census 2020	Pop'n Estimate mid 2024	Pop'n density 2024 (/km^{2})	Ref
Medan (City)	281.99	2,097,610	2,435,252	2,486.283	8,817	
Binjai (City)	90.45	246,154	291,842	307,170	3,396	
Deli Serdang Regency	2,497.72	1,790,431	1,931,441	2,048,480	820	
Karo Regency (part)	224.69	86,244	98,328	103,046	459	
Greater Medan	3,094.85	4,220,439	4,756,863	4,944,979	1,598	

=== Ethnicities and languages ===
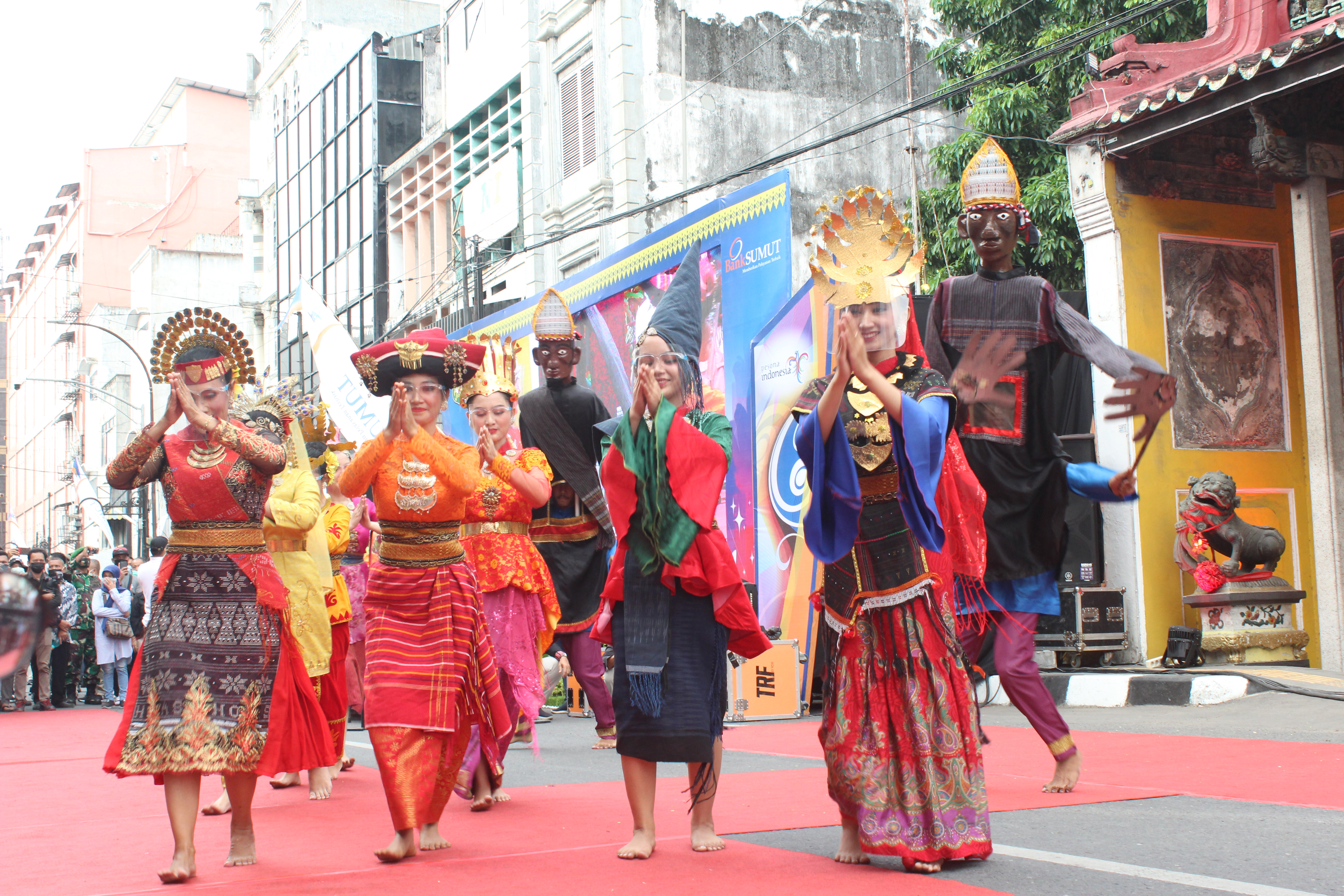
Bataks is the largest ethnic group in Medan.

The dominant ethnic groups in Medan are Batak and Javanese, with smaller Malays, Chinese, Acehnese, Indian, Nias, and Sundanese populations.

The Bataks in Medan are of three subethnicities. The native Karo mostly live in the southern parts of Medan, including Padang Bulan, Medan Johor and Tuntungan. The Toba, whom the Dutch employed on their oil palm plantations, live in Marindal and Amplas, or in nearby city centres such as the Medan Perjuangan district. Finally, the Mandailing, who migrated to Medan after Indonesian independence in search of job opportunities, mainly live in Medan Tembung. The primary languages spoken by Bataks in Medan are Batak and Karo.

The large Javanese community in Medan is primarily composed of the descendants of people transported from Java in the 19th century to be employed as contract workers at various plantations in North Sumatra. For the most part, they speak the local language of Javanese.

The Malays are also natives of Medan, having lived as fishermen in the outskirts of the city since the Aru era. Starting in the 18th century, they began to spread throughout the city, with large numbers living in Medan Maimun, Kota Matsum, Labuhan and Belawan and speaking Malay.

Immigration from southern China to Deli began in the 16th century, and accelerated in the 19th and early 20th centuries as immigrants sought employment as planters and coolies. Medan is home to the largest Chinese population in Sumatra, mostly concentrated around the city centre. Most Chinese people in Medan speak Medan Hokkien, a local dialect, but many also speak Mandarin, Teochew, or Cantonese.

Minangkabau came to Medan since the late of the 19th century. Minangs migration surged from the 1960s to the 1980s, becoming 10.9% of the population and founding Padang restaurants throughout the city. Most Minangkabau people in Medan speak Minangkabau. They are mostly concentrated around the city centre, near Central Market (Pajak Sentral), Kota Matsum and Sukaramai.

Many Acehnese sought sanctuary in Medan after the insurgency in Aceh in the late 1970s. They now own a number of Mie Aceh restaurants around the Setia Budi and Sunggal areas. Most speak Acehnese, and Gayonese is also common.

Medan also has a substantial Tamil Indonesian community. Kampung Madras, a busy area in the city centre, is well-known as a Tamil neighbourhood.

The different linguistic communities in Medan communicate in a slang called Bahasa Medan or Dialek Medan (Medanese slang). This dialect of Indonesian includes loanwords from the various local languages, especially Malay.

=== Religion ===
Religion of Medan – 2025 Census
Religion	Percent
Islam	65.78%
Christianity	24.78%
Buddhism	8.79%
Hinduism	0.79%
Others	0.01%

Most of Medan's inhabitants are Muslim, accounting for approximately 65.78 percent of the population. The substantial Christian demographic (about 25 percent of the total population) includes Catholics, Methodists, and Lutherans, such as the Batak Christian Protestant Church. Buddhists make up about 9 percent of the population, and there are smaller Hindu, Confucian, and Sikh communities. Some Bataknese follow traditional religions such as Pemena and Parmalim.

Gunung Timur Temple, on Jalan Hang Tuah, is Medan's oldest Taoist temple. Maha Vihara Maitreya, on Jalan Cemara Asri, is the largest Buddhist temple in southeast Asia. The city's oldest church, Medan Cathedral, on Jalan Pemuda, was originally built as Indische Kerk by the Dutch and Indian community. Sri Mariamman Temple, on Jalan Zainul Arifin in Kampung Madras, is the city's oldest Hindu temple, built around 1881; it is surrounded by over a hundred statues of various deities. Graha Maria Annai Velangkanni, a Catholic church in an Indo-Mogul style, was built on Jalan Sakura III in 2005, dedicated to a Marian apparition in 17th century Tamil Nadu. At one point before and during the Japanese occupation of the city, Japanese migrants created a Shinto shrine, Hirohara Shrine, to accommodate the increasing worshipers of Japanese residents. It was later rebuilt during the Japanese occupation of the city in 1944 to accommodate the mandatory worship by locals. The former shrine still stands as the last Shinto shrine in Southeast Asia.

== Economy ==
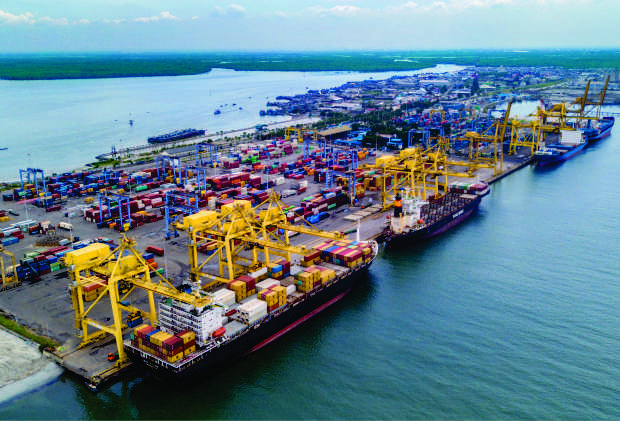
Belawan Container Terminal

The Medan metropolitan area was recognized as an Indonesian National Strategic Region (Indonesian: Kawasan Strategis Nasional) by Government Regulation No 28/2008. As a major commercial and economic hub of Indonesia, Medan is a centre for the production and trade of commodities including cinnamon, tobacco, tea, coffee, rubber, and palm oil. It also has a growing manufacturing sector, producing goods such as cars, machinery, tile, and paper and pulp.

Medan's location makes it the main hub of international trade in western Indonesia, with exports going to Europe, North America, and the Middle East. Its trade and tourism businesses have also become essential to the Indonesia–Malaysia–Thailand Growth Triangle. Many multinational companies maintain offices in the city, such as Asian Agri, London Sumatra, Musim Mas, Philips Lighting, Toba Pulp Lestari, Marriott, Wilmar, ABB and DBS Bank. Rapid development in Medan has resulted in an upward trend in residential property prices.

Medan is one of the major shopping centres of Indonesia, along with Jakarta, Bandung and Surabaya. Shopping malls in Medan include:

- Cambridge City Square
- Centre Point
- DeliPark Mall
- Focal Point
- Lippo Plaza Mall
- Manhattan Times Square
- Medan Mall
- Olympia Plaza
- Plaza Medan Fair
- Ringroad City Walks
- Sun Plaza
- Thamrin Plaza

There is a lively trade in live fruit bats (Pteropus, Cynopterus) in Sumatra. Research led by EcoVerde Global Consulting showed ongoing trade in the markets of Greater Median with 100s of bats being offered for sale, and higher numbers per capita in economically less affluent areas.

== Cuisine ==
Medan is known as "the culinary heaven of Indonesia" for its variety of ethnic cuisines and prominent street hawkers. Prominent restaurants in Medan include Garuda and Uda Sayang (nasi padang and gulai), Sate Afrizal Amir (sate padang), Cahaya Baru (chapati and tandoori), OnDo Batak grill and Tesalonika (babi panggang (grilled pork) and saksang), Jalan Selat Panjang and Jalan Semarang (Chinese food), Jalan Pagaruyung (Indian and Malay food), and Jalan Padan Bulan (Batak food). Other major culinary destinations in Medan include Merdeka Walk, an outdoor area with a number of restaurants, and Pasar Rame, a daily outdoor market.

The local cuisine in Medan comes from a variety of culinary traditions. Soto Medan is a savoury stew of mixed meats and coconut milk, usually served with rice and perkedel. Bika ambon, a popular local cake, is traditionally flavoured with pandanus, but can also be found in banana, durian, cheese, and chocolate flavours. Babi Panggang Karo, grilled pork dipped in blood curd, may be served with sambal andaliman made from local peppers.

== Tourism ==
=== Landmarks ===
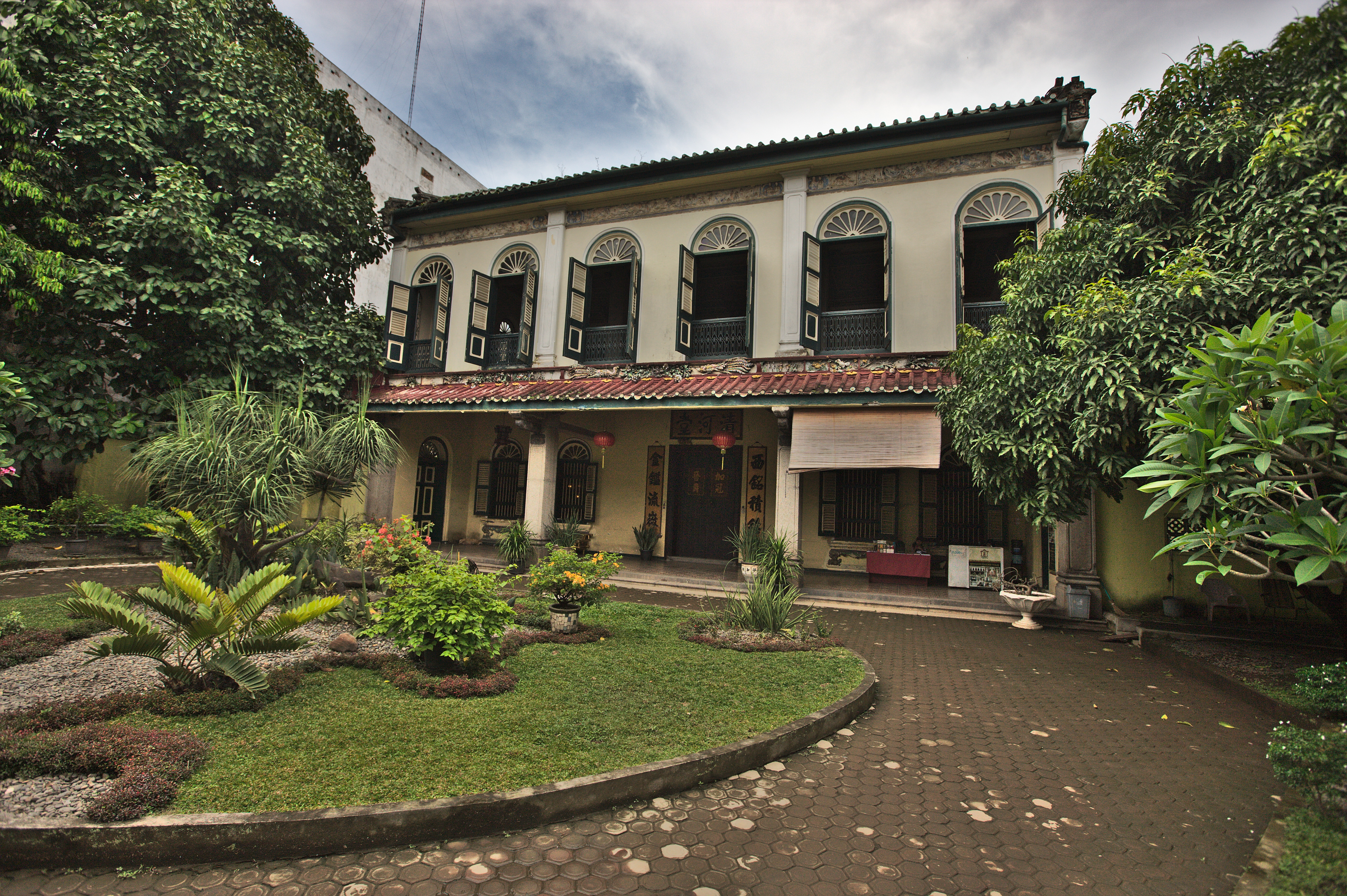
The Tjong A Fie Mansion

Many examples of colonial Dutch architecture survive in Medan. Prominent instances include the old City Hall, the Medan Post Office, Inna Dharma Deli Hotel, Titi Gantung bridge, the Lonsum building, the Tjong A Fie Mansion, the A.V.R.O.S. building, the Warenhuis building, and the Tirtanadi Water Tower.

The Sultan of Deli (whose position is now purely ceremonial) still lives in Maimoon Palace, built 1887-1891. The Great Mosque of Medan, built in 1906, was designed in a Moroccan style by the Dutch architect A.J. Dingemans.

=== Museums ===
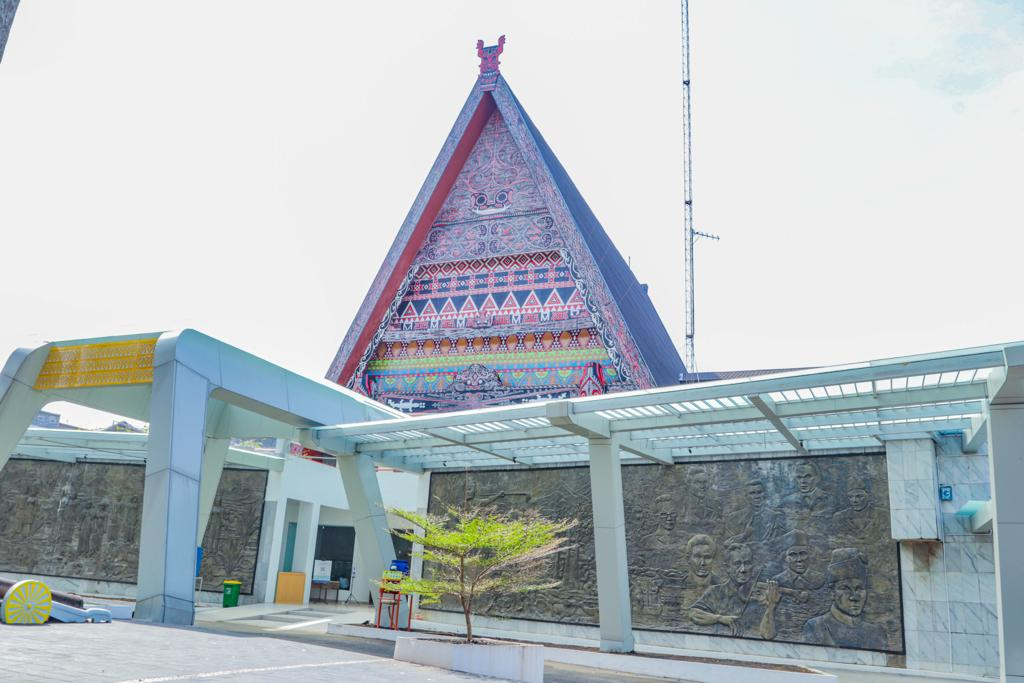
The North Sumatra Museum

The North Sumatra Museum, located south of the city's centre, was formally opened in April 1982 by Daoed Joesoef, Minister of Education and Culture. The museum's collection centres around artefacts of North Sumatran ethnic groups.

The Bukit Barisan Museum is a military museum opened by Brigade General Leo Lopulisa on 21 June 1971. Located at 8 Jalan H. Zainul Arifin, the museum houses a number of historic weapons used in the 1958 revolt in North Sumatra, and displays paintings of the rebellion against the Netherlands.

The Rahmat International Wildlife Museum & Gallery, which opened in 1999, is considered the city's outstanding taxidermy collection. It is located on Jalan Letjen S. Parman No.309.

== Transportation ==
=== Airport ===
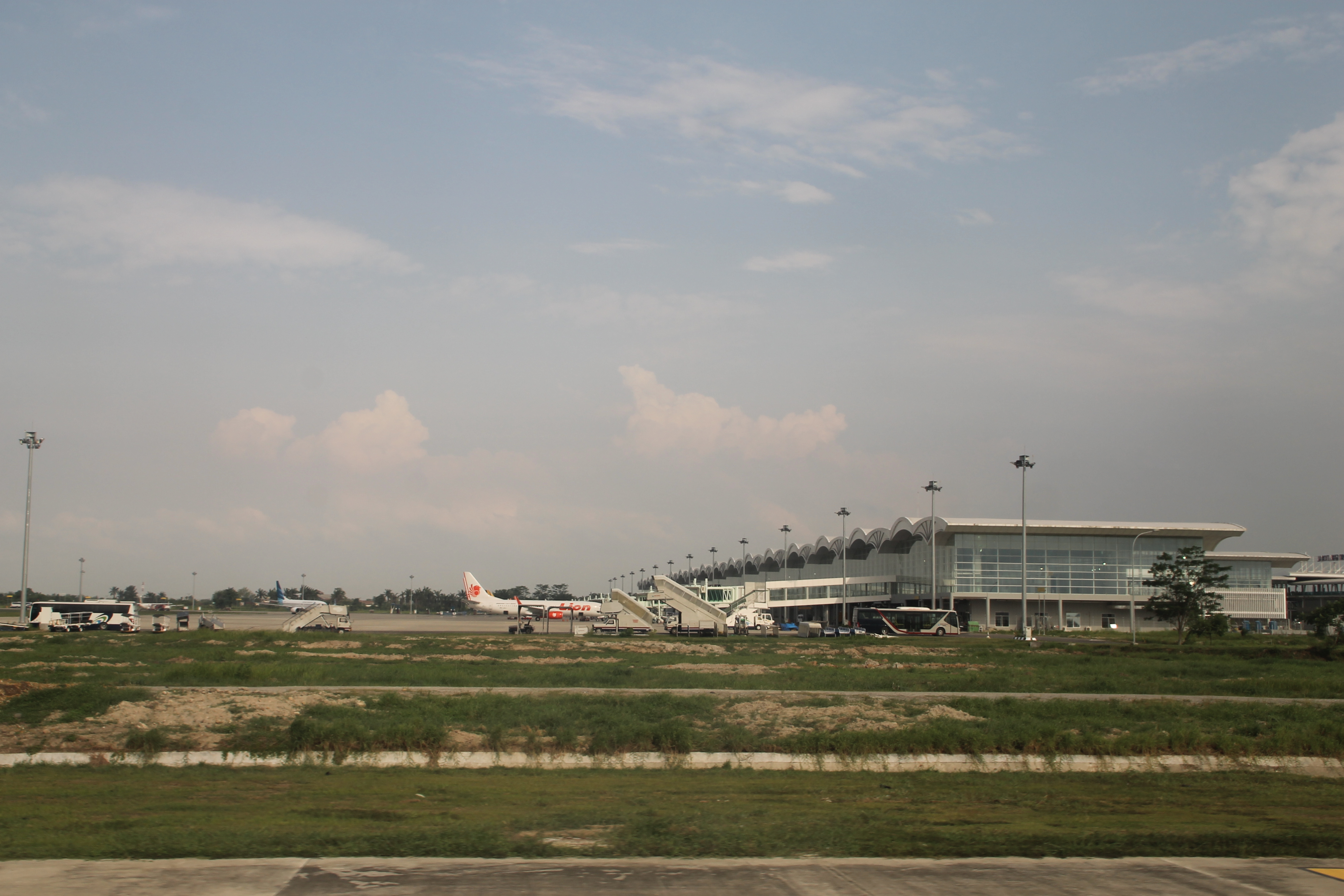
Kualanamu International Airport

The Kualanamu International Airport (KNO) opened on 25 July 2013 as a replacement for the Polonia Airport. Located 39 km (24 mi) from downtown Medan, it is Indonesia's first airport with a direct rail link to the city. The airport has a 224,298 m^{2} (2,414,324 sq ft) passenger terminal, and serves as a hub for Garuda Indonesia, Indonesia AirAsia, Lion Air, Susi Air and Wings Air, with direct domestic flights to many major cities in Sumatra, as well as Java-international flights to locations abroad including Malaysia, Singapore, Thailand, Saudi Arabia, and Sri Lanka.

=== Seaport ===
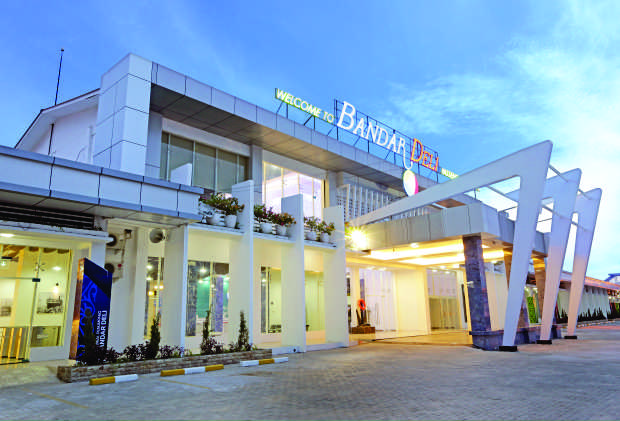
The Bandar Deli terminal in Belawan

The Port of Belawan is on the northeast coast of Sumatra, 19 km (12 mi) north of Medan and accessible by a railway across the channel south of the island. Originally built in 1890 for European tobacco exports, the harbour was expanded in 1907 with a new section for Chinese and indigenous traders.

The growth of northern Sumatra's rubber and palm oil plantations in the early twentieth century brought new developments to the port. Several major berthing facilities were built in the 1920s, and by 1938 the port handled the greatest cargo value of any in the Dutch East Indies. Trade volumes dropped substantially after Indonesian independence, but reached pre-independence levels again in the mid-1960s. A major restructuring in 1985 saw the construction of a container terminal; it almost immediately captured about one-fifth of Indonesia's containerized exports. Major products exported include rubber, palm oil, tea, and coffee.

The current port has two terminals. The first, which handles passengers, offers ferry services to cities including Penang, Langkawi, Batam, Jakarta, and Surabaya. The second, Belawan International Container Terminal (BICT), is used for export and import services, and is one of the largest shipping industry ports in Indonesia.

=== Roads ===
Major roads through Medan include the Trans-Sumatran Highway and the Belmera Toll Road. Other toll roads link the city to the airport, Binjai, and Tebing Tinggi.

=== Railway ===
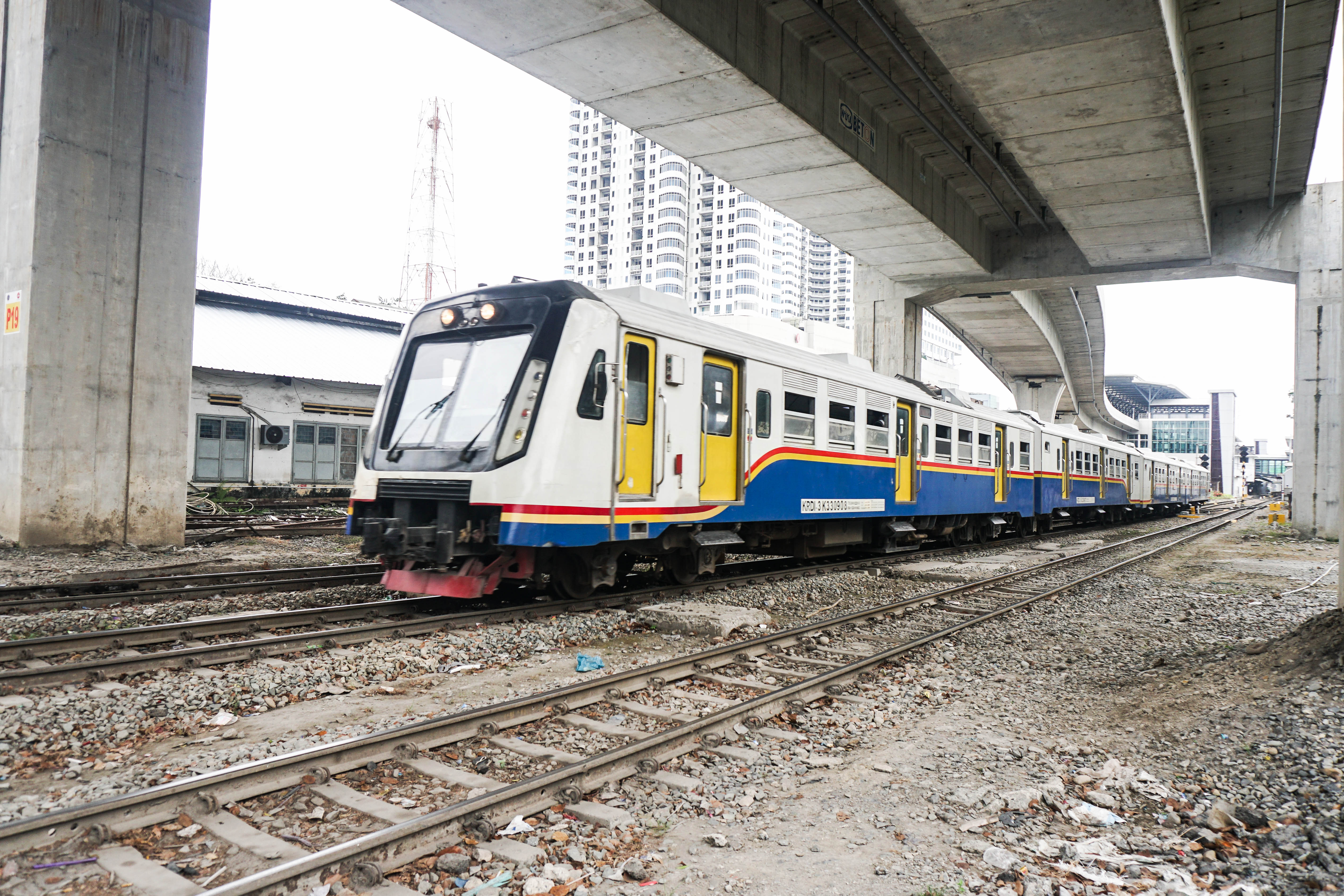
Sri Lelawangsa commuter rail departing from Medan station

The largest train station in Medan is Medan Station. The city also has a number of smaller stations, including Medan Pasar, Pulu Brayan, Titi Papan, Labuhan, and Belawan. Of these, Titi Papan and Pulu Brayan serve exclusively freight trains, while the others also serve passenger trains.

Express trains run between Medan and cities including Tebing Tinggi, Pematang Siantar, Tanjungbalai, and Rantau Prapat, and the Kualanamu Airport Railink Services express train runs between Medan Station and Kualanamu International Airport Station. Other rail lines connect Medan to cities such as Binjai and Belawan.

An elevated railway over several rail lines around Medan avoids level crossings and reduces traffic congestion.

=== Public transport ===
Both auto rickshaws and cycle rickshaws are widely available in Medan, for a cheap pre-negotiated fare. Ride-sharing services Gojek and Grab are also in widespread use.

While taxis exist, most locals use sudako, Medan's share taxi system. These minibuses follow routes indicated by numbers displayed on the vehicle; route maps are not published, instead typically being spread by word-of-mouth.

Medan and its nearby urban areas have two bus rapid transit systems, Trans Mebidang and Medan Electric Bus, each with several active corridors.

==== Trans Mebidang ====
Corridor	Origin–Destination
1	Medan – Binjai
2	Medan – Lubuk Pakam

==== Medan Electric Bus ====
Corridor	Origin–Destination
1	Pinang Baris – Lapangan Merdeka
2	Amplas – Lapangan Merdeka
3	Belawan – Lapangan Merdeka
4	Medan Tuntungan – Lapangan Merdeka
5	Tembung – Lapangan Merdeka

== Media ==
=== Television ===
Medan's television stations include public and private national networks, as well as local channels. TVRI Sumatera Utara, a public station serving North Sumatra, is headquartered in the city. Channels currently available in Medan include:

- CNN Indonesia
- TVRI Sumatera Utara
- Indosiar
- MNCTV
- Trans TV
- ANtv
- GTV
- RCTI
- SCTV
- tvOne
- Magna TV HD
- Metro TV
- Trans7
- NET. – 43 UHF
- iNews – 45 UHF
- DAAI TV – 49 UHF
- RTV 53 UHF
- MYTV – 55 UHF
- Kompas TV – 59 UHF
- CTV Network – 61 UHF

=== Radio ===
RRI Medan is the only public radio in Medan. Popular stations in Medan include Prambors FM, MNC Trijaya FM, I-Radio, KISS FM, VISI FM, and Delta FM.Several local languages are also served on the radio, such as Kardopa Radio (in the Batak language) and Symphony FM (in the Malay language).=

=== Newspapers ===
Mimbar Umum is Medan's oldest newspaper. Other major newspapers based in Medan include Waspada, Analisa, Jurnal Medan, Berita Sore, Harian Global, Harian Medan Bisnis, Sumut Pos, Posmetro Medan, Sinar Indonesia Baru, Tribun Medan and The Jakarta Post.

=== Literature ===
From the 1930s through the 1960s, Medan was the source of a major body of Indonesian literature, known as "Roman Medan". These books usually depicted local life in Medan and surrounding areas of Deli.

Several romance novel writers grew up in Medan, including Hamka, Joesoef Sou'yb, Tamar Djaja, Matu Mona, and A. Damhoeri.

== Sport ==
Football is one of the most popular sports in Medan, with five local clubs: Persatuan Sepakbola Medan dan Sekitarnya (known as PSMS Medan), Medan Jaya, Medan Chiefs, Bintang PSMS and Medan United. Teladan Stadium, Medan's multi-purpose stadium, is used primarily for football matches.

== Healthcare ==
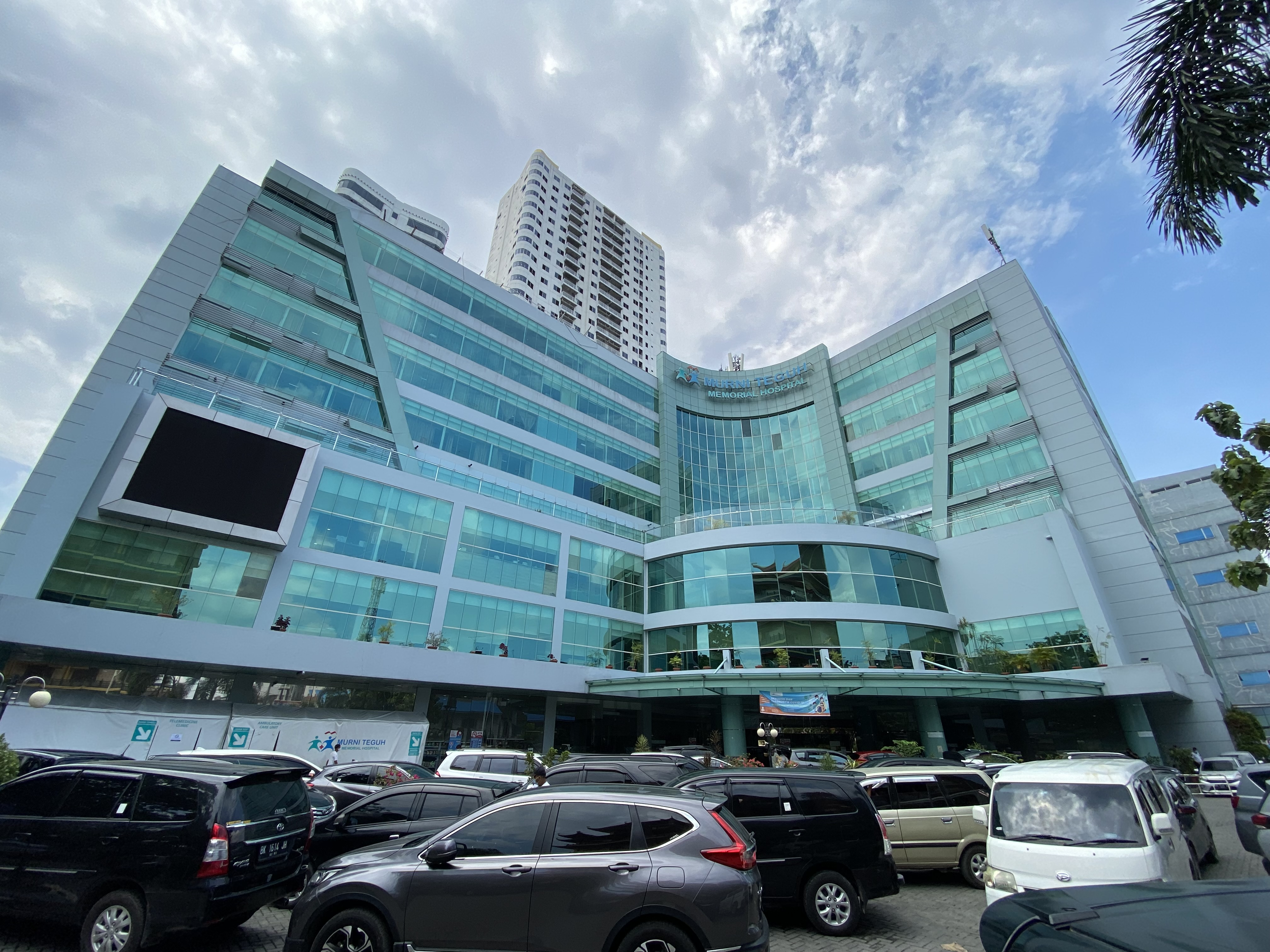
Murni Teguh Hospital

Medan has more than 30 registered hospitals, three public and the rest private.

- Pirngadi General Hospital
- Adam Malik General Hospital
- Haji General Hospital
- St. Elisabeth Hospital
- Martha Friska Hospital
- Columbia Asia Hospital
- Permata Bunda Hospital
- Murni Teguh Hospital
- Advent Hospital
- Siloam-Dhirga Surya Hospital
- Imelda Hospital
- Vina Estetica Hospital
- Stella Maris Hospital
- Putri Hijau Military Hospital
- Mitra Sejati General Hospital
- Bunda Thamrin Hospital
- Royal Prima Hospital
- Methodist Hospital
- Sumatra Eye Center
- Eshmun Hospital

== Education ==
=== Elementary, middle, and high schools ===
Medan has more than 827 registered elementary schools, 337 middle schools and 288 high schools, including state-owned, private, religious, and international schools.

- Chandra Kumala School
- Cinta Budaya School
- Medan Independent School
- Methodist High School (2–3) Medan
- Nanyang Zhi Hui School
- Perguruan Santo Thomas Medan
- Prime One School
- Singapore Intercultural Schools Medan
- SMA Negeri 1 Medan (state-owned high school)
- SMA Negeri 2 Medan (state-owned high school)
- SMA Negeri 3 Medan (state-owned high school)
- SMA Negeri 4 Medan (state-owned high school)
- SMP Negeri 18 Medan (state-owned middle school)
- Sutomo School (1–2)
- Telkom Vocational School (Medan)
- Yayasan Pendidikan Shafiatul Amaliyah
- Yayasan Pendidikan Harapan
- SMK Tritech Informatika Medan

=== Universities and Colleges ===
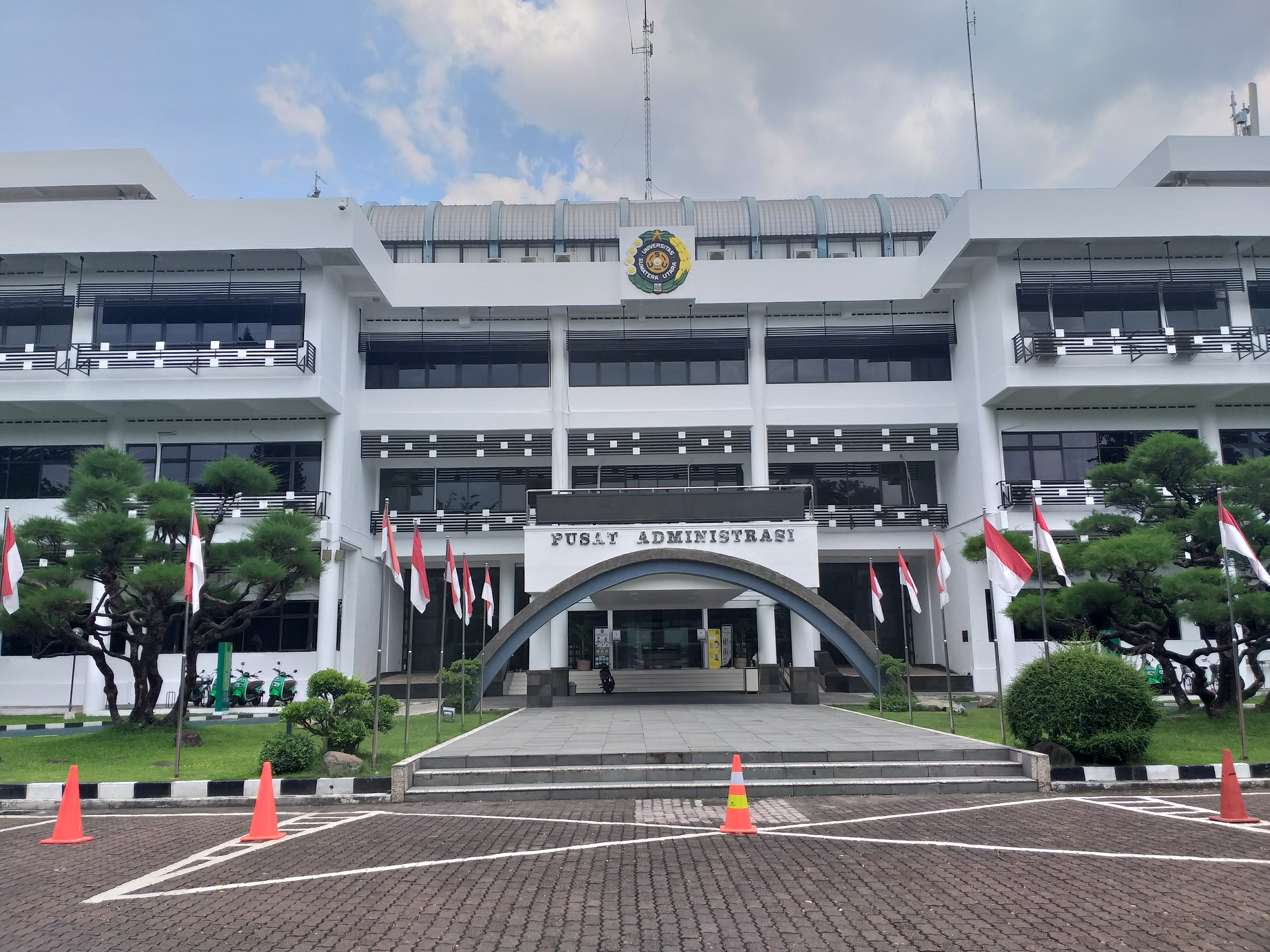
University of North Sumatra

Medan's 72 registered universities, academies, polytechnics, and colleges include:

- Dharmawangsa University
- HKBP Nommensen University
- IT&B Campus
- Medan State Polytechnic
- Medan Tourism Academy
- Mikroskil University
- Muhammadiyah University of North Sumatra
- Pelita Harapan University
- Prima University
- State University of Medan
- STBA-PIA
- STIE Eka Prasetya
- Universitas Darma Agung (UDA)
- Universitas Methodist Indonesia
- University of North Sumatra
- University of Pembangunan Panca Budi
- Technology Institute of Medan

== International relations ==
=== Consulates ===
Medan hosts consulates from foreign countries, such as:

- China (Consulate-General)
- India (Consulate-General)
- Japan (Consulate-General)
- Malaysia (Consulate-General)
- Singapore (Consulate-General)
- United States (Consulate)

=== Twin towns – sister cities ===
Medan is twinned with:

- George Town, Penang Island, Malaysia (10 October 1984)
- Ichikawa, Chiba Prefecture, Japan (4 November 1989)
- Gwangju, South Jeolla Province, South Korea (24 September 1997)
- Chengdu, Sichuan Province, China (17 December 2002)
- Milwaukee, Wisconsin, United States (30 October 2014)

== See also ==
- Medan metropolitan area
