= Hamparan Perak =

Hamparan Perak is a town and administrative district (kecamatan) of Deli Serdang Regency in the province of North Sumatra, Indonesia. The population of the town was 17,419 in mid 2024. It is the district capital of the Hamparan Perak district.

== Hamparan Perak District ==
The district lies immediately to the west and north of the city of Medan, and thus encompasses many of the city's suburban districts in that direction. It is geographically the largest district in Deli Serdang Regency, with an area of 262.88 km^{2} and a population of 150,054 at the 2010 Census and 163,521 at the 2020 Census; the official estimate as at mid 2024 was 180,027 - comprising 91,501 males and 88,526 females. It is composed of twenty 'villages' (most of which are suburban to the city of Medan), set out below with their areas and their populations at the 2010 Census and 2020 Census, together with the official estimates as at mid 2024. Each has the status of a desa (rural village), and they share the postcode of 20374.

Kode Wilayah	Name	Area in km^{2}	Pop'n Census 2010	Pop'n Census 2020	Pop'n Estimate mid 2024
12.07.24.2006	Tandam Hulu Dua	4.26	7,583	6,857	7,407
12.07.24.2012	Tandam Hulu Satu	24.85	3,550	2,946	2,982
12.07.24.2011	Paya Bakung	16.50	10,563	12,090	13,689
12.07.24.2005	Klambir Lima Kampung	1.00	5,123	5,460	6,154
12.07.24.2009	Klambir Lima Kebon	25.58	19,503	21,763	23,356
12.07.24.2003	Klumpang Kebon	21.80	12,364	13,667	15,242
12.07.24.2004	Klumpang Kampung	1.20	5,404	6,033	6,729
12.07.24.2010	Sialang Muda	1.20	1,639	1,719	1,971
12.07.24.2016	Buluh Cina	36.86	13,183	13,779	15,187
12.07.24.2013	Tandam Hilir Satu	20.63	11,315	11,162	12,230

Kode Wilayah	Name	Area in km^{2}	Pop'n Census 2010	Pop'n Census 2020	Pop'n Estimate mid 2024
12.07.24.2014	Tandam Hilir Dua	9.74	8,923	9,727	10,652
12.07.24.2015	Kota Datar	14.14	6,353	6,471	7,097
12.07.24.2017	Kota Rantang	6.50	5,075	6,151	6,672
12.07.24.2019	Kampung Lama	5.09	4,665	5,950	6,657
12.07.24.2007	Klambir	4.40	5,222	5,555	6,333
12.07.24.2008	Kampung Selemak	0.70	2,779	4,178	5,278
12.07.24.2001	Hamparan Perak	9.00	14,157	16,496	17,419
12.07.24.2002	Sungai Baharu	8.00	4,156	4,213	4,714
12.07.24.2018	Paluh Manan	18.93	3,171	3,523	3,965
12.07.24.2020	Paluh Kurau	32.50	5,326	5,781	6,293
12.07.24	Totals	262.88	150,054	163,521	180,027

The ten desa listed in the left-hand columns form the southern half of Hamparan Perak District, with about 105,000 inhabitants. The ten desa listed in the right-hand columns form the northern half of the district, with about 75,000 inhabitants; the two desa of Telaga Tujuh and Karang Gading (technically part of Labuhan Deli District) are geographically to the north of Hamparan Perak District, and are situated between the district and the riverine border with Langkat Regency.
