= Gocah Pahlawan =

Tuanku Sri Paduka Gocah Pahlawan (titled Laksamana Khoja Bintan,) also known as Muhammad Dalik according to Hikayat Deli, was the founder of the Sultanate of Deli and the Sultanate of Serdang in North Sumatra, Indonesia. According to the tarombo (ancestor genealogy) from Deli and Serdang, Gocah Pahlawan was of Indian ethnicity, sent by Sultan Iskandar Muda in 1612 to rule in the former Aru Kingdom. He was appointed as a representative commander (wali negara, guardian of the state) of the Aceh Sultanate for the area, to fight the Portuguese influence and establish alliances with the local population, who generally were Karo peoples.

Deli sources mentioned that Gocah Pahlawan came from India and that his original name was Muhammad Delikhan, while Serdang sources mentioned that his original name was Yazid and he was a descendant of the rulers of Bukit Siguntang Mahameru, who left the Pagaruyung Kingdom on an Indian merchant ship. Both sources agreed that before Gocah Pahlawan went to Deli, he was first stranded in Pasai, Aceh. He then made services to the Aceh Sultanate by leading its forces in the wars in Bengkulu, Johor, and Pahang. He successfully captured the two daughters of the king of Pahang, namely Princess Kamariah and Princess Khairul Bariah.

Gocah Pahlawan married the younger sister of the Sunggal chieftain (Karo: raja urung), Datuk Itam Surbakti, who was the strongest chieftain in that area (Deli Tua), and made alliances with the other three chieftains. The name of the Sunggal chieftain's sister was Princess Nang Bulan (Baluan) beru Surbakti, and the marriage was conducted around 1632. The Karo chieftains who had converted to Islam and adopted the Malay culture then regarded him as their supreme leader (primus inter pares) for the region. The early kingdom led by Gocah Pahlawan was then called the Bintan Kingdom. Its initial territory was from the border of the Tamiang river to the Rokan Pasir Ayam Denak river. With the help of the Karo chieftains, he expanded his power to Percut and other areas in Deli.

Gocah Pahlawan died around 1641, his tomb is located in Batu Jerguk, Deli Tua. His rule was continued by his son, Tuanku Panglima Perunggit.

== See also ==
- Deli Serdang Regency, current administrative area formerly belonged to Deli and Serdang sultanates
- Malay Indonesian, dominant culture of Deli and Serdang sultanates' people
- Ma'mun Al-Rashid, 9th Sultan of Deli
