= Perunggit =

Sultan of Deli
- Reign: 1641-1700
- Predecessor: Tuanku Panglima Gocah Pahlawan
- Successor: Tuanku Panglima Paderap
Regnal name
- Tuanku Panglima Perunggit
- Father: Tuanku Panglima Gocah Pahlawan
- Mother: Putri Nang Bulan Beru Surbakti
- Religion: Sunni Islam

Tuanku Panglima Perunggit, also titled Kejuruan Padang, was the second ruler (1641–1700) of the Sultanate of Deli (now in North Sumatra, Indonesia). He continued the rule of his father Tuanku Panglima Gocah Pahlawan, who was the representative commander (wali negara) of the Aceh Sultanate to rule former area of the conquered Aru Kingdom. His mother's name was Putri Nang Bulan beru Surbakti, a sister of the Sunggal chieftain (Karo: raja urung), Datuk Itam Surbakti, one of the rulers of the Karo people in Deli Tua.

As the Aceh Sultanate's influence was then weakening in various regions of Sumatra, Perunggit took the opportunity to make Deli independent. He first gained support from the Dutch East India Company in Malacca, and in 1667 sent envoys directly to its headquarters in Batavia. In 1669, Perunggit announced that Deli was independent from Aceh's realm.

Perunggit was married to the sister of the Sukapiring chieftain. After he died, his rule was continued by his son, Tuanku Panglima Paderap.

== See also ==
- Sultanate of Deli
- Sultanate of Serdang
