= Gandar Wahid =

Sultan of Deli
- Reign: 1761-1805
- Predecessor: Tuanku Panglima Pasutan
- Successor: Amaluddin Mangendar
Regnal name
- Tuanku Panglima Gandar Wahid
- Father: Tuanku Panglima Pasutan
- Religion: Sunni Islam

Tuanku Panglima Gandar Wahid was the fifth Sultan of Deli, ruling from 1761 to 1805.

== Life ==
He was the son of Tuanku Panglima Pasutan, the fourth ruler of Deli, now part of Deli Serdang Regency in North Sumatra, Indonesia.

During Gandar Wahid's reign, the position of the four Karo tribal leaders (Malay: datuk empat suku, Karo: raja urung) became more established as sultan's representatives to the people. Continuing the previous leadership system, he maintained the implementation of the Islamic legal code (kanun) in his administration. Although part of the Deli territory had already seceded to form the Sultanate of Serdang, he endeavored to improve the welfare of the people remaining in his domain and maintained good social relations with them. Also during his reign, the Zapin Labuhan dance was developed, reflecting the Deli Malay cultural growth of his period.

Gandar Wahid's reign was succeeded by his third son, Amaluddin Mangendar Alam. His tomb is located in the courtyard of the Al-Osmani Grand Mosque in Medan.

== See also ==
- Sultanate of Deli
- Sultanate of Serdang
