= Al-Osmani Mosque =

Mosque in Medan, North Sumatra, Indonesia

- Masjid Al-Osmani مسجد العثمانا
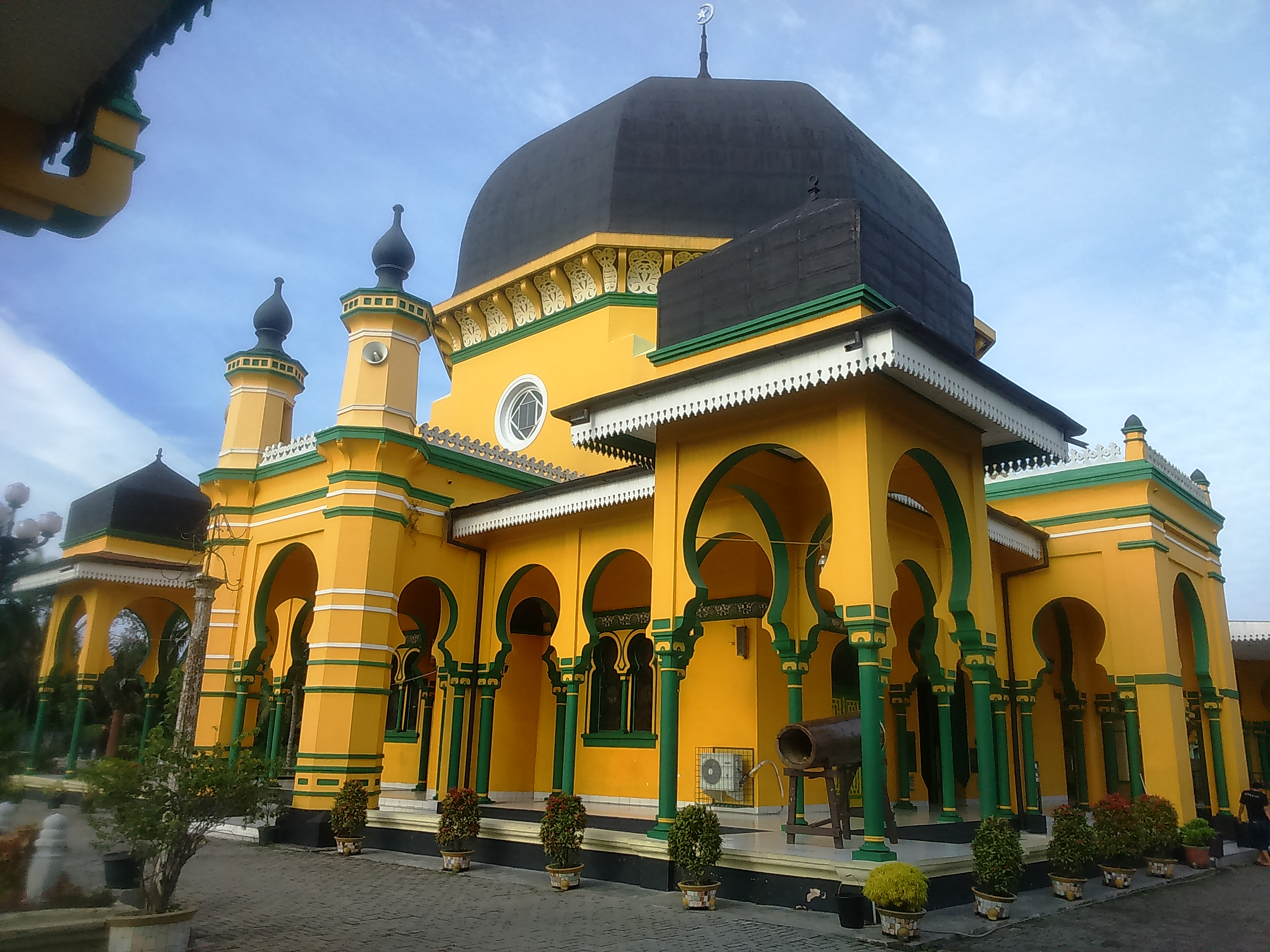

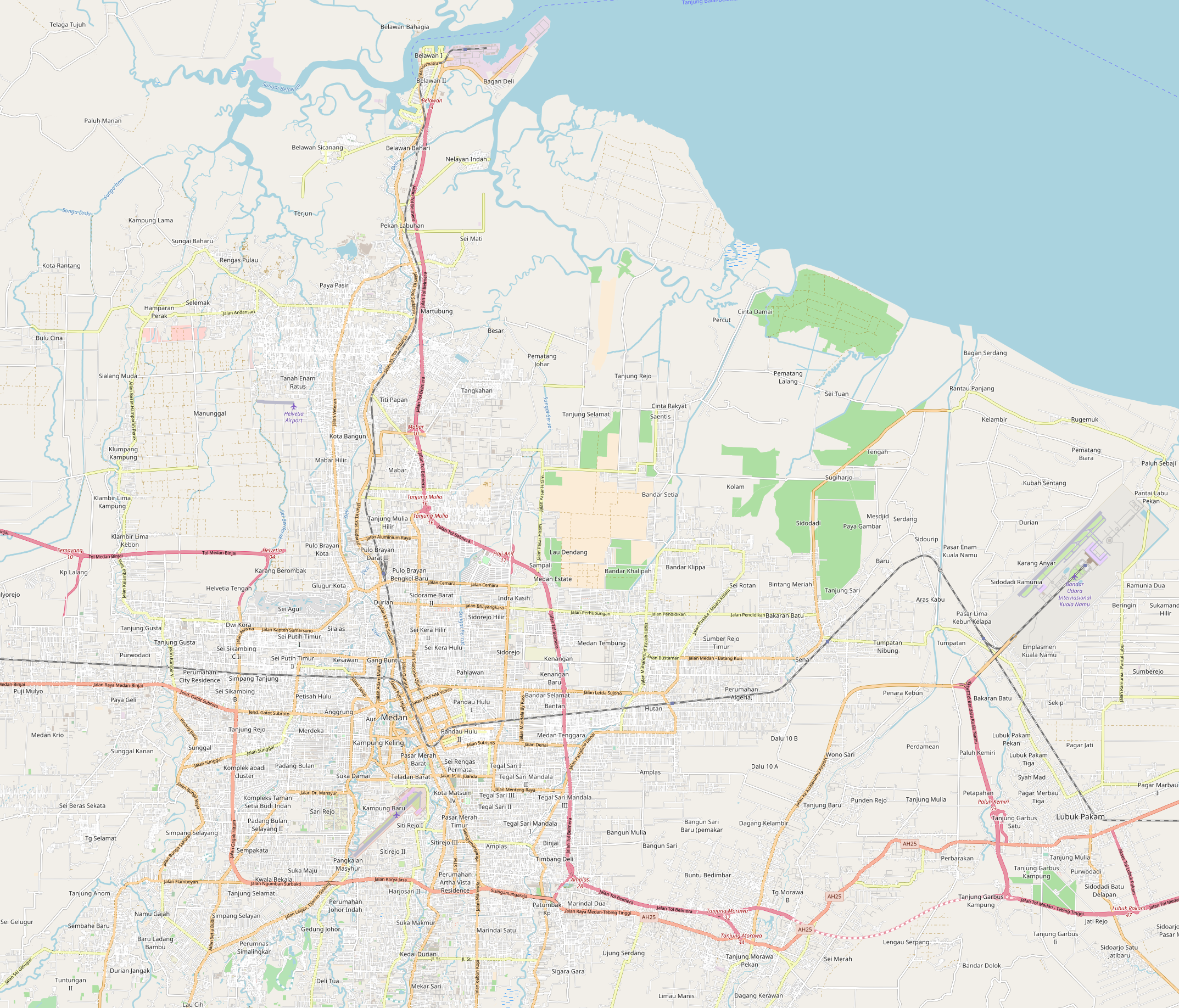
- Location in Medan, Northern Sumatra, Sumatra, and Indonesia Al-Osmani Mosque (Northern Sumatra) Al-Osmani Mosque (Sumatra) Al-Osmani Mosque (Indonesia)

Religion
- Affiliation: Islam
- Branch/tradition: Sunni

Location
- Location: Medan, North Sumatra, Indonesia
- Interactive map of Al-Osmani Mosque
- Coordinates: 3.732239°N 98.676205°E

Architecture
- Architect: GD Langereis
- Style: Moorish, Mughal, Spanish, Malay
- Groundbreaking: 1854

Al-Osmani Mosque is a mosque in Medan, North Sumatra, Indonesia. The mosque is also known as Labuhan mosque because it is located in the district of Medan Labuhan. The mosque is located on the K.L. Yos Sudarso road, subdistrict of Pekan Labuhan, about 20 kilometers north of the city of Medan. In front of this mosque there is a school, named YASPI School (Islamic Education Foundation), and not far from the mosque there is a Chinese temple named Pekong Lima, and in front of the temple there is a path that leads to Labuhan market. The mosque is the oldest in the city of Medan.

Masjid Al-Osmani was built in 1854 by the 7th of Deli sultan, Sultan Osman Perkasa Alam by using wood material. Then from 1870 to 1872, the mosque, which was made of wood, was built to be a permanent building by the child of Sultan Osman, Sultan Mahmud Perkasa Alam who also became the 8th Sultan of Deli.

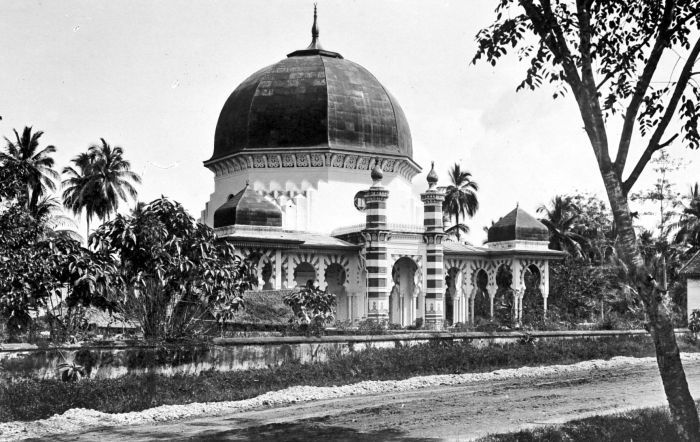
The mosque, taken around 1900–1916

Up to now, apart from being used as a place of worship, the mosque was also used for memorials and the celebration of religious holidays. It was the place of departure for pilgrims to Mecca that came from northern areas of Medan. Five notable royal figures are interred in this mosque: the Tuanku Panglima Pasutan (4th Sultan of Deli), Tuanku Panglima Gandar Wahid (5th Sultan of Deli), Sulthan Amaluddin Perkasa Alam (6th Sultan of Deli), Sultan Osman Perkasa Alam, and Sulthan Mahmud Perkasa Alam.

== Architecture ==
When first built, the Al-Osmani mosque measured only 16 x 16 meters with the main material of wood. In 1870, Sultan Mahmud Al-Rashid Deli VIII had the mosque redesigned by Dutch architect GD Langereis. In addition to building a permanent base, with material from Europe and Persia, he also expanded its size to 26 x 26 meters. Renovation was completed in 1872.

Several restorations to the building of this mosque have been carried out without losing the original architecture of the building, which is a blend of Middle Eastern, Indian, Spanish, Malay, and Chinese styles.

The combination of the architecture based on the four countries, for example the Chinese styled ornate door of the mosque, the building carving nuanced by Indian, and European style architecture and ornaments nuanced with Middle East. The design is unique, stylish Indian with a copper dome octagonal. The domes are made from brass, weighing up to 2.5 tons.

Masjid Al-Osmani has a predominantly yellow color, with a golden yellow color which is the color of the pride of the Malays. The colors are interpreted as a show of pomp and glory. Combined with the green color this indicates Islamic philosophy.
