= Paderap =

Third Ruler of Deli Sultanate

Sultan of Deli
- Reign: 1700-1720
- Predecessor: Tuanku Panglima Perunggit
- Successor: Tuanku Panglima Pasutan
Regnal name
- Tuanku Panglima Paderap
- Father: Tuanku Panglima Perunggit
- Religion: Sunni Islam

Tuanku Panglima Paderap, also called Panglima Deli, was the third ruler of the Deli Sultanate, now part of North Sumatra, Indonesia. He succeeded his father Tuanku Panglima Perunggit, who died around 1700. Paderap had four sons, namely Tuanku Jalaluddin (or Kejuruan Metar), Tuanku Panglima Pasutan (or Kejuruan Padang), Tuanku Tawar (or Kejuruan Santun), and Tuanku Umar (or Kejuruan Junjongan).

A power struggle happened in the Deli after Paderap died in 1720. Jalaluddin, Paderap's first son, could not replace him because of a physical disability. It was Pasutan who became the fourth ruler of Deli, while his younger brother Umar became the first ruler of the Serdang Sultanate.

Paderap was buried in Pulau Brayan district in Medan city.

== See also ==
- Deli Sultanate
- Serdang Sultanate
