= Tuanku Sultan Otteman II =

Sultan Otteman II Perkasa 'Alam Shah ibni al-Marhum Sultan 'Amal ud-din al-Sani Perkasa 'Alam Shah (1945–1967) was a former Sultan of Deli, in which the kingdom's capital was Medan, in North Sumatra. He was born to Sultan 'Amal ud-din II Perkasa 'Alam Shah, the Sultan of Deli, and Raja Maheran, third daughter of Sultan 'Abdu'llah Muhammad Shah II Habibu'llah (a former Sultan of Perak). He was the eldest son.
