= Sultan Ma'mun Al Rashid Perkasa Alamsyah =

Sultan of Deli

Seri Paduka Tuanku Sultan Ma'mun Al Rasyid Perkasa Alam Shah, مأمون الرشيد ڤركاس عالم شاه
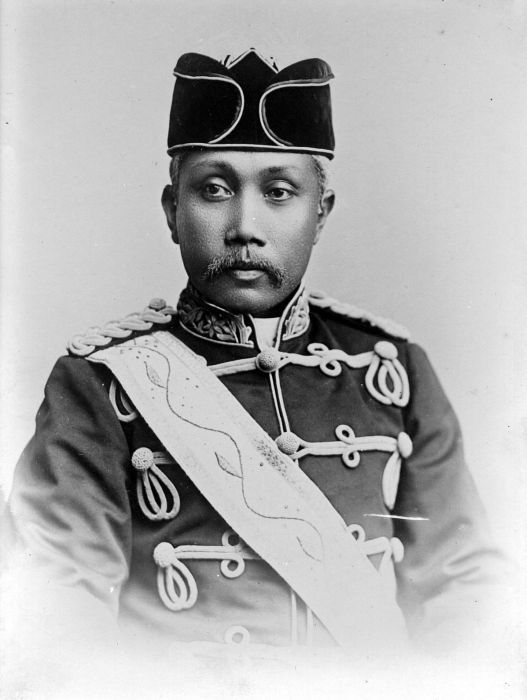
- Portrait of Sultan Ma'mun Al Rasyid Perkasa Alam, 1900s

9th Sultan of Deli
- In office 1873–1924
- Preceded by: Amaluddin II
- Succeeded by: Sultan Amaluddin Sultan Al Sani Perkasa Alamsyah

Personal details
- Born: 26 August 1855 Labuhan Deli, Sultanate of Deli
- Died: 9 September 1924 (aged 69) Maimoon Palace, Medan, Dutch East Indies
- Resting place: Great Mosque of Medan's Royal cemetery
- Spouse(s): Encik Nemakn, Encik Ganda, Tengku Maimuna
- Children: Tengku Ridwan; Tengku Harun; Tengku Aminuddin; Sultan Amaluddin Al Sani Perkasa Alamsyah; Tengku Putri; Tengku Chantek; Tengku Eria Kamala
- Parents: Sultan Amaluddin Mahmud Perkasa Alam Shah (father); Tengku Zaleha (mother)

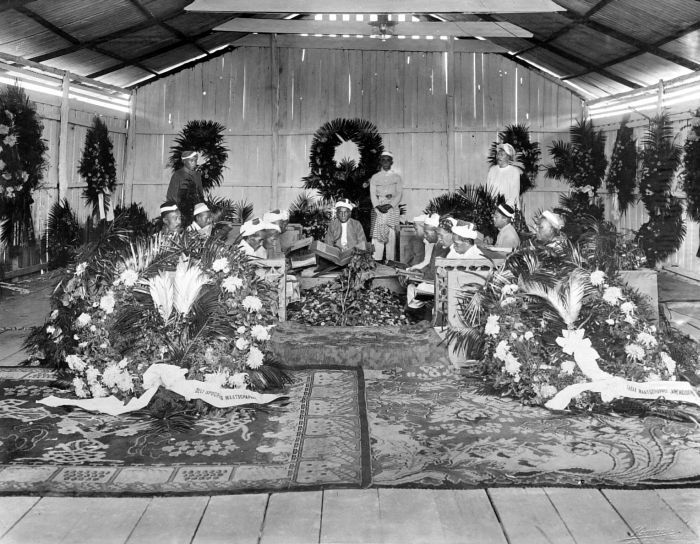
Sultan Ma'amun Al Rashid Perkasa Alam Shah's funeral

Sultan Ma'mun Al Rashid Perkasa Alam Shah (Jawi:مأمون الرشيد ڤركاس عالم شاه) was the 9th king of the Sultanate of Deli. His title after his death was Marhum Makmur.

== Early life ==
He was born on a Sunday, 13 Zulhijjah 1271 H (26 August 1855), and became Sultan at a young age, so a regency and advisory body was formed consisting of Tengku Soelaiman, Tengku Viceroy of Deli, Tengku Soeloeng Laoet, Prince Bedagai State Wazir Deli, and Tengku Abdurrahman, Tengku Temenggong Deli. Once he reached the age of seventeen, he was officiated as Sultan of Deli.

During his reign, the advanced tobacco trade caused the Sultanate to reach its height of prosperity. The Sultan was presented two honorary ranks of the Kingdom of the Netherlands as a measure of thanks for his services. He was presented the Order of Orange-Nassau and De Ridder Van De Nederlandsche Leeuw Order. Under his reign, the center of government was transferred to Medan.

== Sultanate life ==
Sultan Ma'moen Al-Rashid Perkasa Alam established a palace in Kampung Bahar in 1886, which was finished in 1888.

The Sultan moved from Kota Bahari palace to the new Maimoon Palace in 1903, and also established a Court for the Office of the Sultan. In 1906 construction began for the Great Mosque of Medan in the city Ma'sum which was first used for prayers in 1909.

Tuanku Sultan Abdul Aziz Abdul Jalil Rahmatsyah of the state of Langkat and Sultan Sulaiman Syariful Alam of the state of Serdang also attended Friday prayers during the Grand Mosque's prime. During his reign many public facilities were built for the betterment of society. He died in 1924, leaving three sons and five daughters. He was buried in the Great Mosque of Medan.
