= Maimun Palace =

Maimoon Palace
- Istana Maimoon
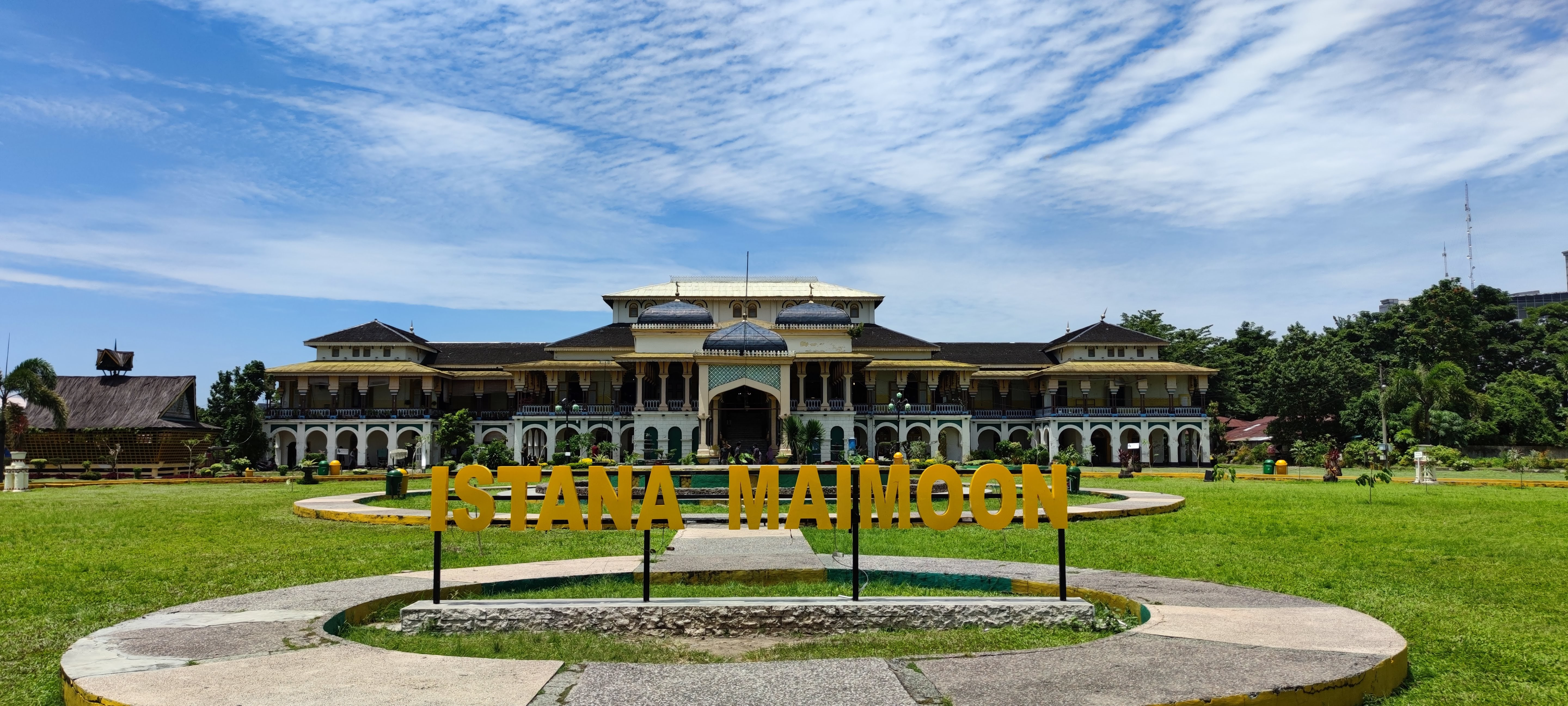
- Maimoon Palace, 2021

General information
- Type: Palace
- Location: Jl. Brigjend. Katamso no. 1, Medan, North Sumatra, Indonesia
- Coordinates: 3.575201°N 98.683883°E
- Construction started: 1887
- Completed: 1892
- Owner: Deli Sultanate

Technical details
- Floor area: 2,772 m^{2}

Design and construction
- Architect: ir. A.P. Melchior c.i.

Website
- Ministry of Tourism Website

Maimoon Palace or Maimun Palace (Indonesian: Istana Maimun) is an istana (royal palace) of the Sultanate of Deli and a well-known landmark in Medan, the capital city of Northern Sumatra, Indonesia. Today, it serves as a museum. The name is the Arabic word for "blessing".

Built by Sultan Ma'mun Al Rashid Perkasa Alamsyah in the years 1887–1891, the palace was designed by the Dutch engineer, later Director of B.O.W., ir. A. P. Melchior c.i. and covers 2,772 m^{2} with a total of 30 rooms. The palace has become a popular tourist destination in the city, not solely because of its historical heritage status, but also because of its unique interior design of the palace, combining elements of Malay cultural heritage, Islamic and Indian architecture, with Spanish and Italian furniture and fittings.

It is the last surviving Malay palace, having avoided destruction during the East Sumatra revolution due to protection by British troops.

== Gallery ==
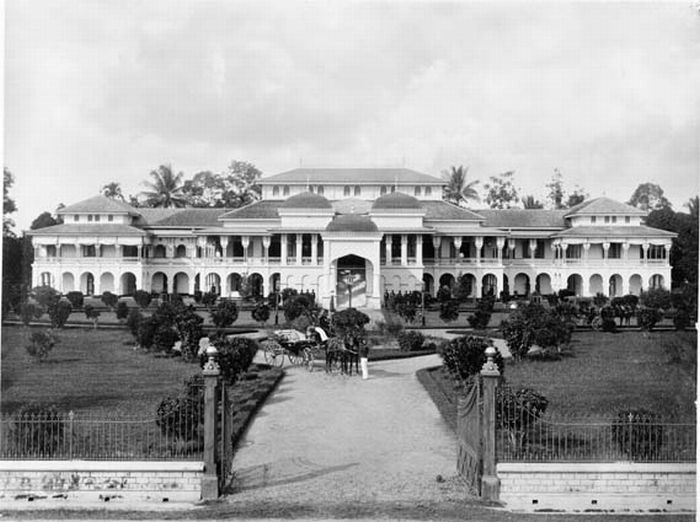
Maimun Palace (ca.1890–1905)

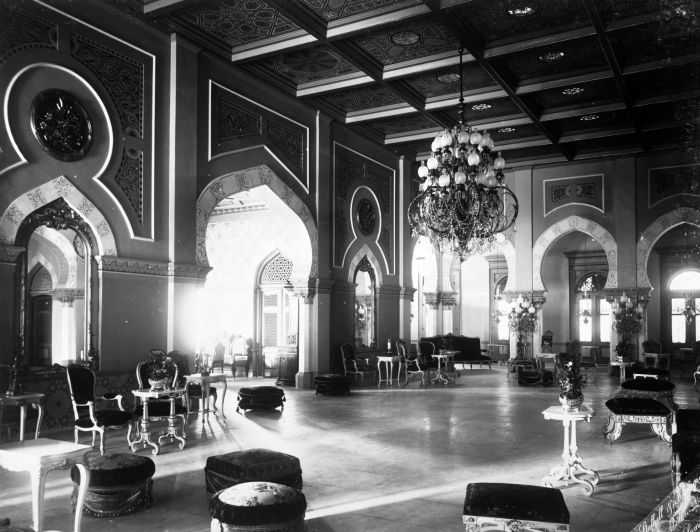
Interior (1890–1894)

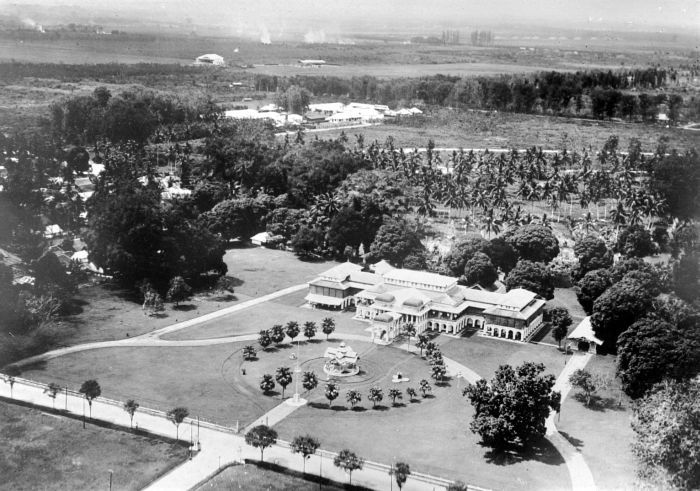
Aerial view (1931)

Underwent Renovation (2011)

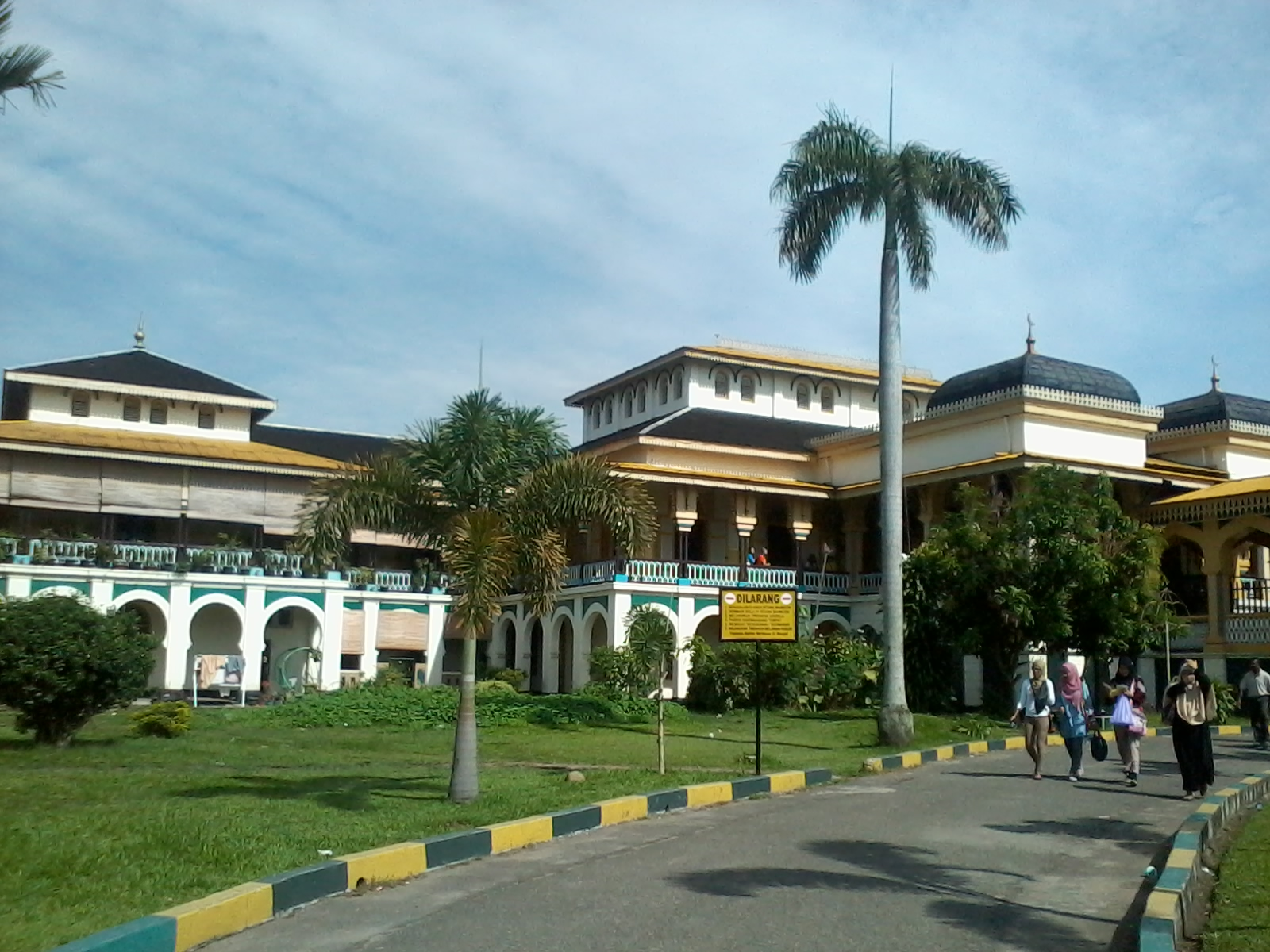
Maimun Palace (2013)

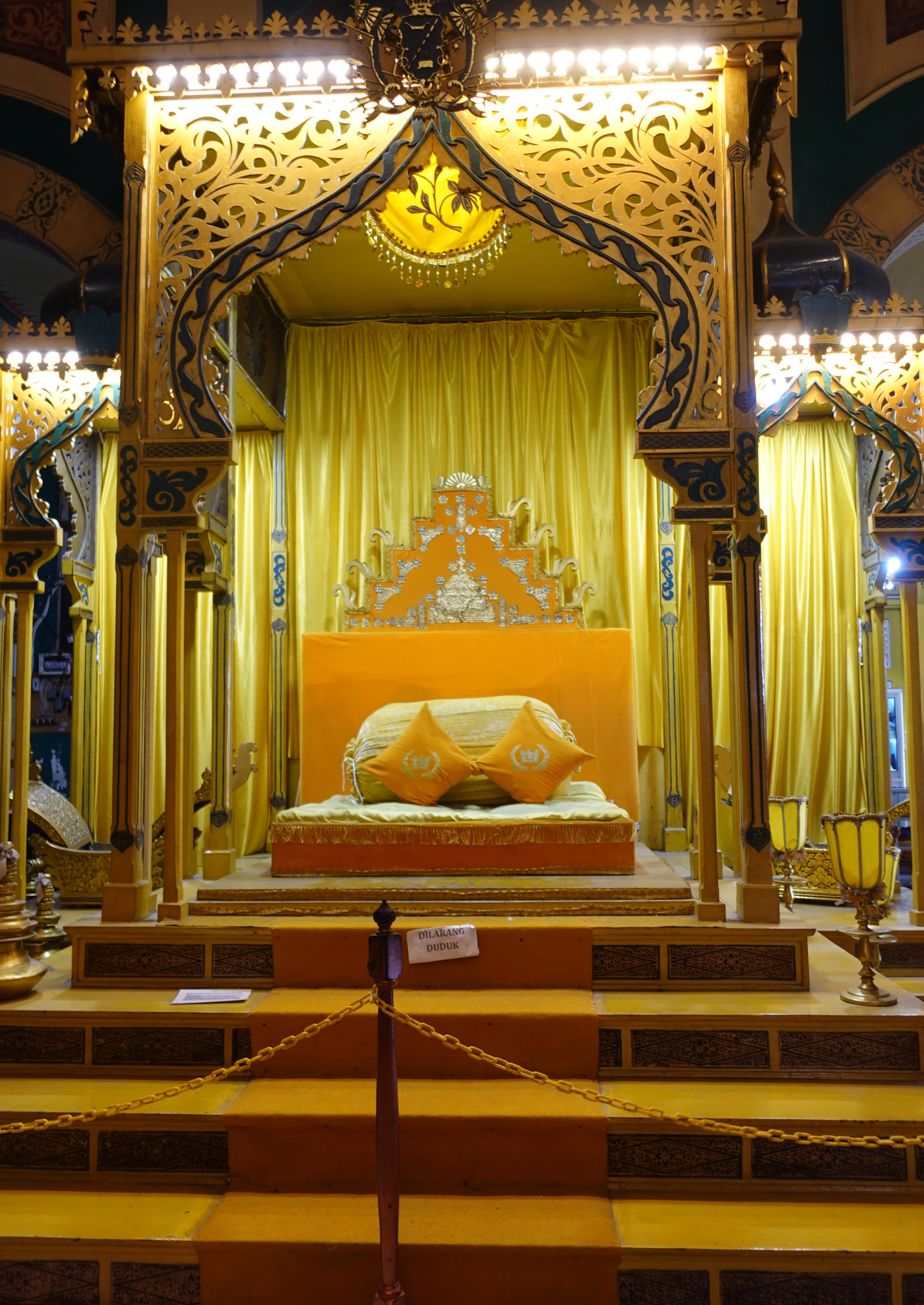
Main throne in Maimun Palace

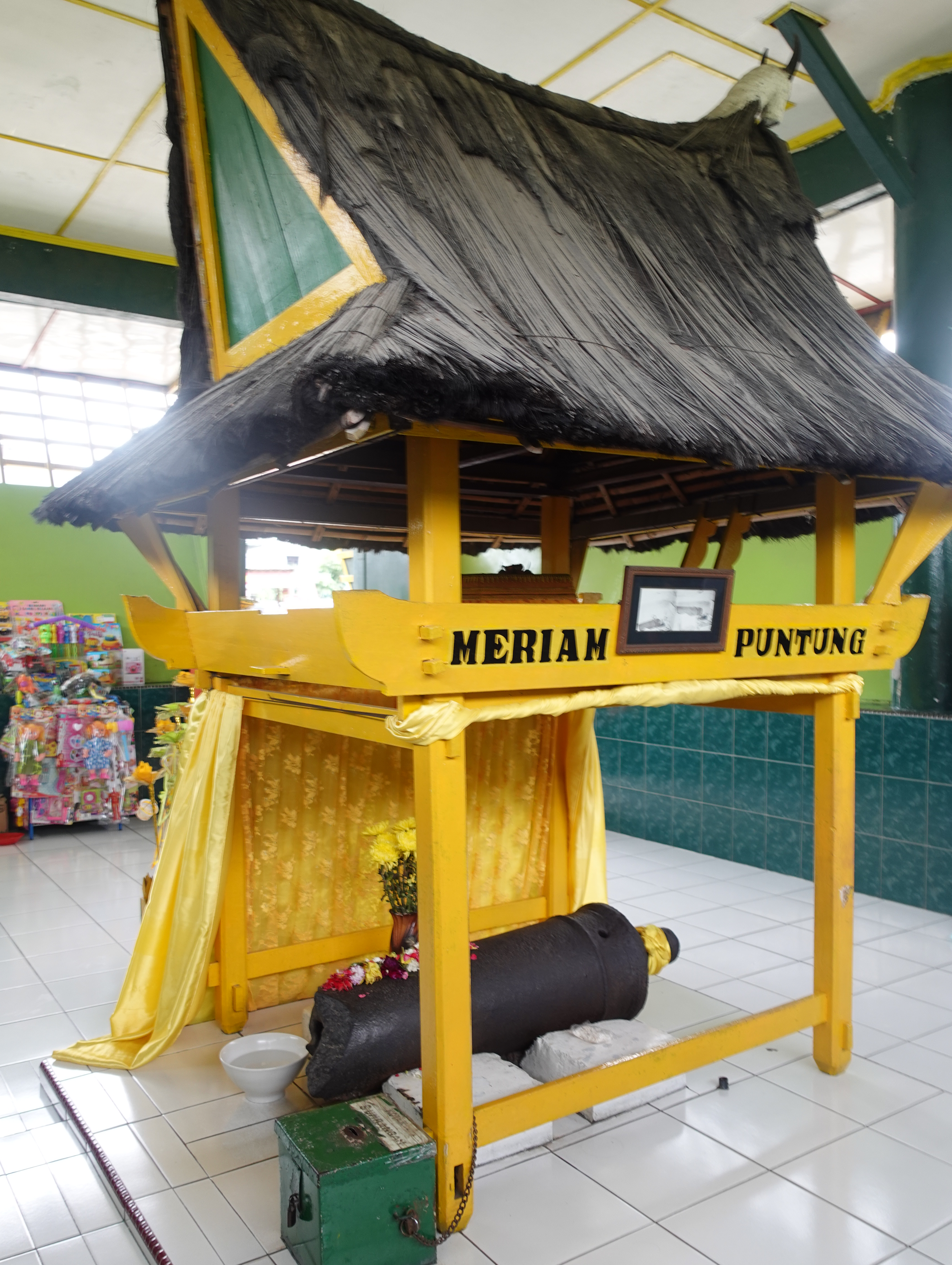
Meriam Puntung (lit; separated cannon); it is believed to be a powerful cannon that was used by the Deli Sultanate to defeat the Aru Kingdom.

== See also ==
- List of colonial buildings in Medan
