= Deli Malay people =

Malay ethnic group

Deli Malays
ملايو ديلي Orang Melayu Deli
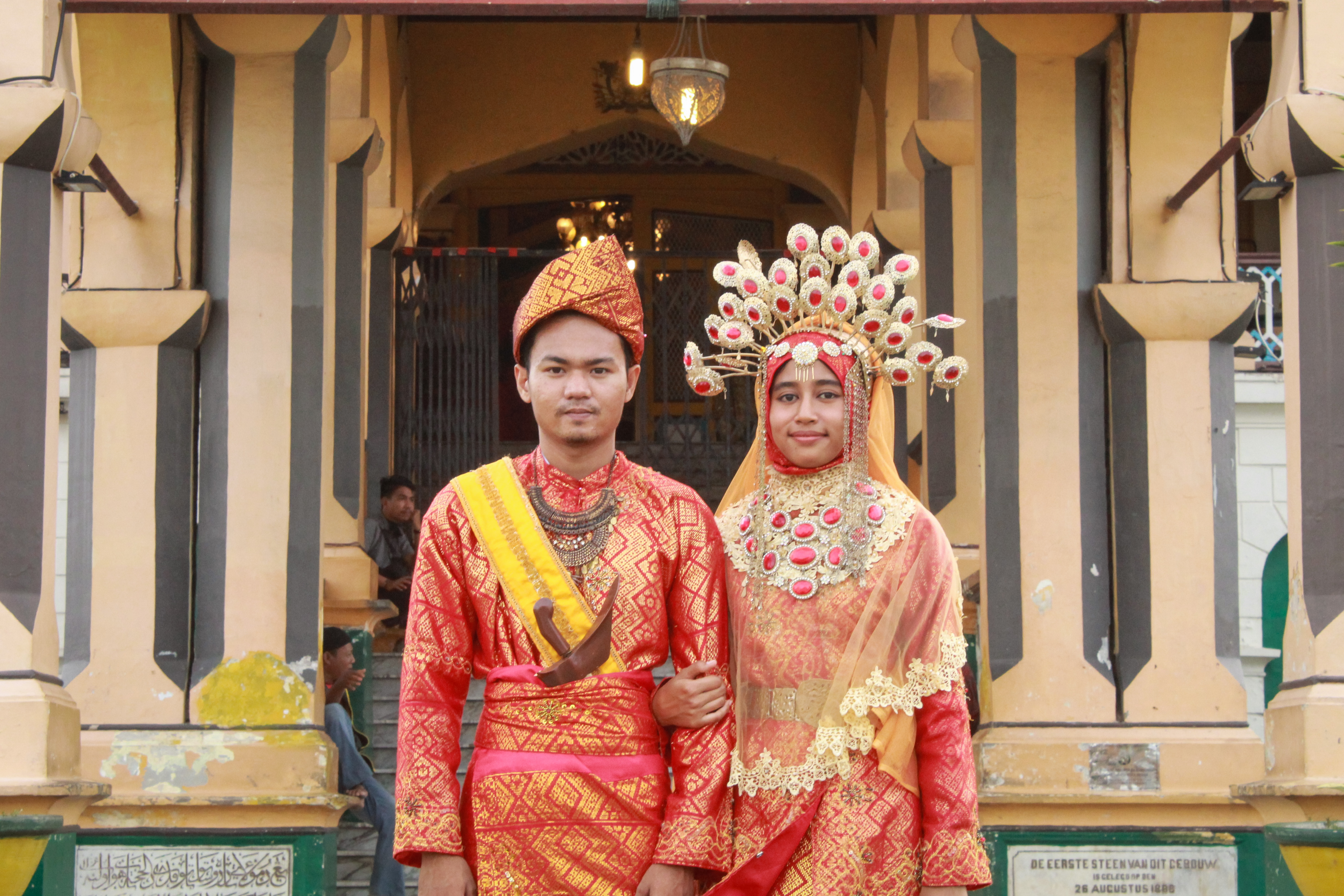
- A bride and groom wearing traditional Deli Malays clothes.

Total population
- 3.88% of the Deli Serdang population

Regions with significant populations
- Indonesia (North Sumatra)

Languages
- Deli Malay (including Medan Malay) and Indonesian

Religion
- Sunni Islam

Related ethnic groups
- Other Malay peoples

Deli Malays (Jawi: ملايو ديلي, Melayu Deli) is a sub-ethnic group of Malays native to the eastern coast of North Sumatra, particularly in the Deli Serdang and Medan. The Deli culture began with the Sultanate of Deli, an Islamic kingdom established in North Sumatra from 1632 to 1946. Deli Malays are known for their famous pantoum art until today.

== Geographic distribution ==
For the centuries, the Deli Malay community has established settlements around the banks of the Deli River which flows through city of Medan to the east coast of Sumatra which flows into the Malacca Strait. Until finally the development of industry in Medan City made many Deli Malay people live around Medan, Old Deli (Deli Tua), the coast of the Deli River, Babura River, Labuhan River, including several surrounding areas.

== See also ==
- Malay people
