= Grand Mosque of Medan =

Mosque in North Sumatra, Indonesia

- Masjid Raya Medan مسجد ميدان الكبير; Masjid Raya Al-Mashun
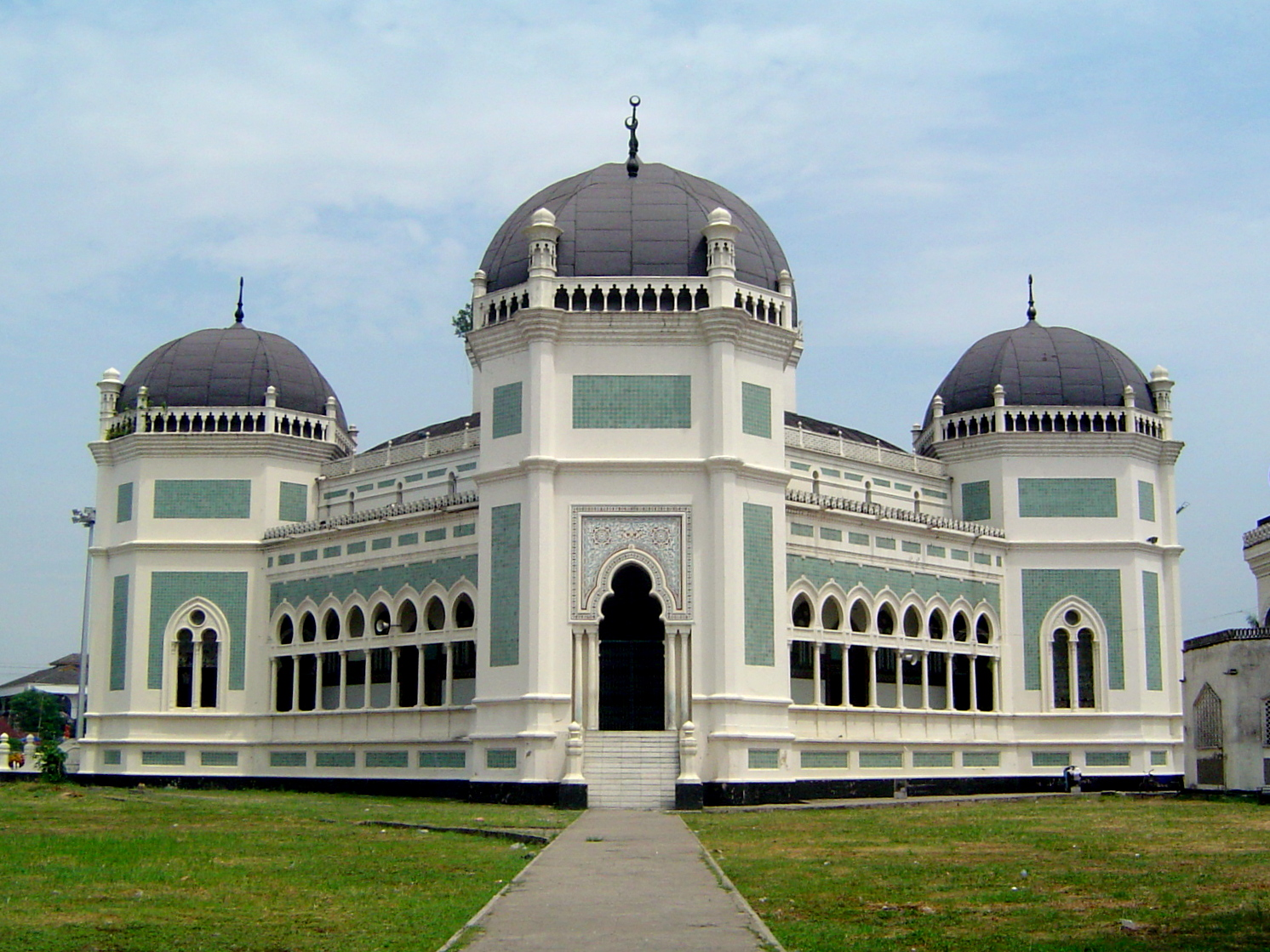

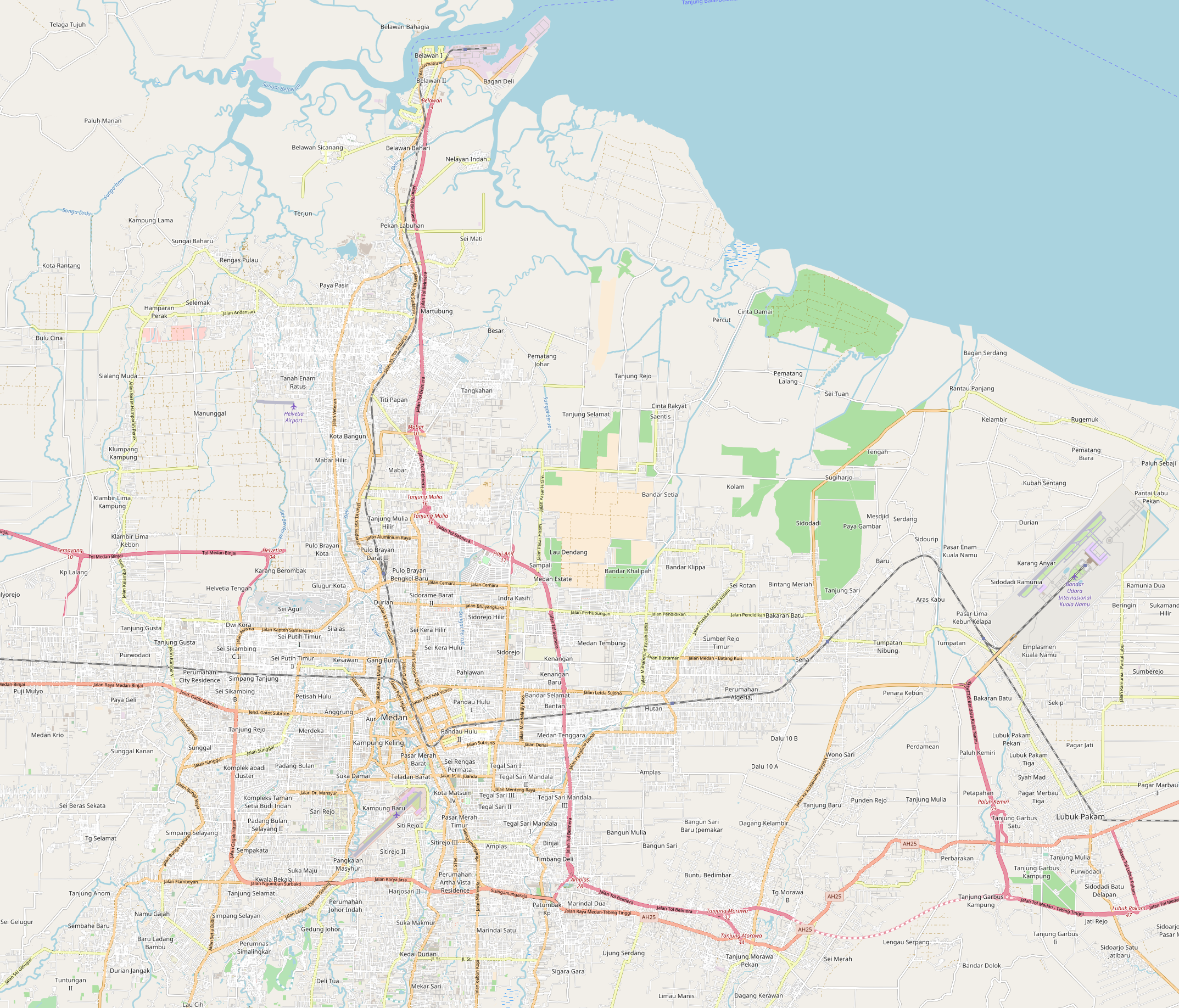
- Location in Medan, Northern Sumatra, Sumatra, and Indonesia Grand Mosque of Medan (Northern Sumatra) Grand Mosque of Medan (Sumatra) Grand Mosque of Medan (Indonesia)

Religion
- Affiliation: Islam
- Branch/tradition: Sunni

Location
- Location: Medan, North Sumatra, Indonesia
- Interactive map of Grand Mosque of Medan
- Coordinates: 3.575111°N 98.687321°E

Architecture
- Architects: Theodoor van Erp; JA Tingdeman
- Style: Moorish, Mughal, Spanish
- Groundbreaking: 1906
- Completed: 1909
- Construction cost: 1 million gulden
- Capacity: 2,000

Grand Mosque of Medan or Masjid Raya Al-Mashun ("Al-Mashun Grand Mosque") is a mosque located in Medan, Indonesia. The mosque was built in the year 1906 and completed in 1909. In beginning of its establishment, the mosque was a part of the Maimun palace complex. Its architectural style combines Middle Eastern, Indian, and Spanish elements. The mosque has an octagonal shape and has wings to the south, east, north, and west.

== History ==
Sultan Ma'mun Al Rashid Perkasa Alam, as a leader of the Sultanate of Deli, started the development of Masjid Al Mashun on 21 August 1906 (1 Rajab 1324 AH). The entire development was completed on 10 September 1909 (25 Sha'ban 1329 AH) and marked by the implementation of the first Friday prayers at the mosque. The overall development budget was one million guilders. The Sultan developed the Mosque according to his principle that it should be more important than his own grand palace, the Maimoon Palace. Construction of the mosque was financed by the Sultanate of Deli, the Deli Maatschappij, and Tjong A Fie, the wealthiest businessman in Medan at that time.

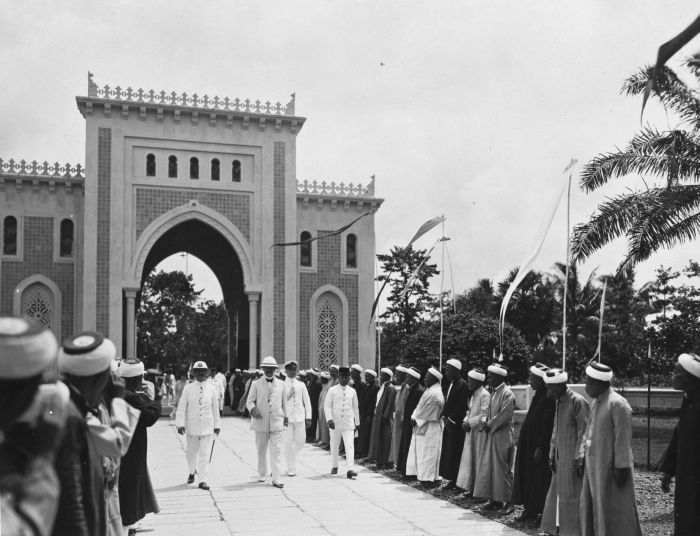
Governor-General Dirk Fock visiting the Great Mosque, 1925

== Architecture ==
At first, the Mosque was designed by the Dutch architect Theodoor van Erp (1874–1958) who also designed The Maimoon Palace, but was then handed over to JA Tingdeman. Van Erp at that time was called to Java by the Dutch government to join in the process of restoring the Borobudur temple in Central Java. The construction required the import of different building materials such as: marble from Italy, Germany and China and the stained glass from the chandelier imported from France.

JA Tingdeman designed the mosque with an octagonal symmetrical layout style, combining elements from Morocco, Europe and the Middle East. The eight square floor plan produced a unique inner chamber, unlike most conventional mosques. A black, high vaulted roof porch is constructed in each of the four corners of the mosque, and complements the main dome on the roof of the main building of the mosque. Each is equipped with a main door and stairs between the courts of the main floor of the mosque is elevated, except building the porch on the side of the mihrab.

The mosque is divided into the main room, ablution, entry gates and towers. The main room, a place of prayer, does not share the same octagonal theme. On the opposite side is smaller, there is a 'porch' small porch attached to and protrudes out. The windows surrounding the veranda doors made of wood with glass-precious stained glass, remnants of the art nouveau period 1890-1914, combined with Islamic art. The walls, ceilings, pillars, arches and surfaces are rich in ornamentation with decorative flowers and plants. Then, earlier octagon, on the outside appear with four aisles on all four sides, which surround the main prayer hall.

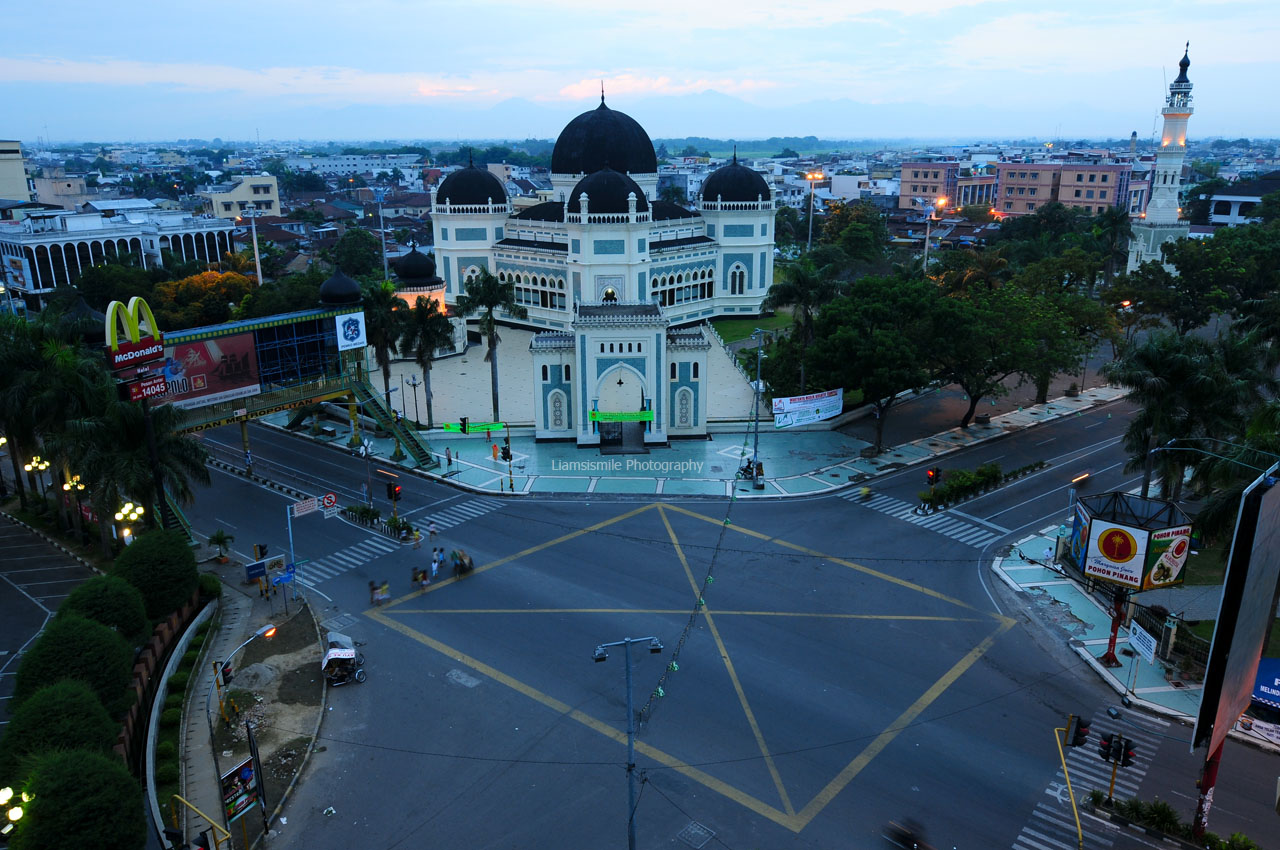
Street view of Great Mosque of Medan

The aisles have a row of bare windows shaped arches which stand on the beam. Both porch and arched windows of the building are designend reminiscent of Islamic kingdoms in Spain in the Middle Ages. While the dome of the mosque follows the Turkish model, the shape of the octagonal broken. The main dome is surrounded by four other domes on top of each porch, with a smaller size. The dome shape is reminiscent of the Grand Mosque of Banda Aceh. On the inside of the mosque, there are eight main pillars with a diameter of 0.60 m to support the main dome in the middle. The mihrab is made of marble with a pointed dome roof. This mosque gate flat-roofed square. The ornate minaret is a blend between Egyptian, Iranian and Arabian.

== See also ==
- List of colonial buildings in Medan
