= Sultanate of Deli =

Malay state in eastern Sumatra, 1632–1946

Sultanate of Deli Kesultanan Deli كسلطانن دلي دارالميمون
- 1632–1946
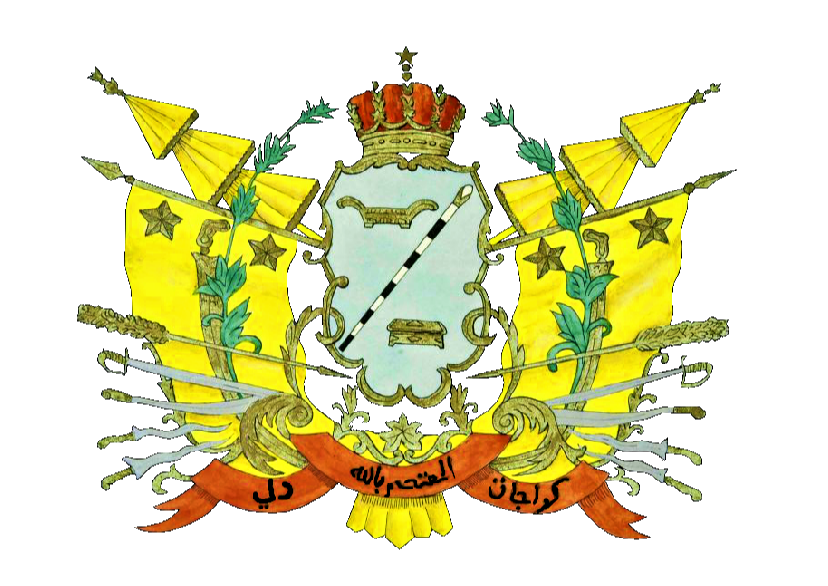
- Flag Coat of arms

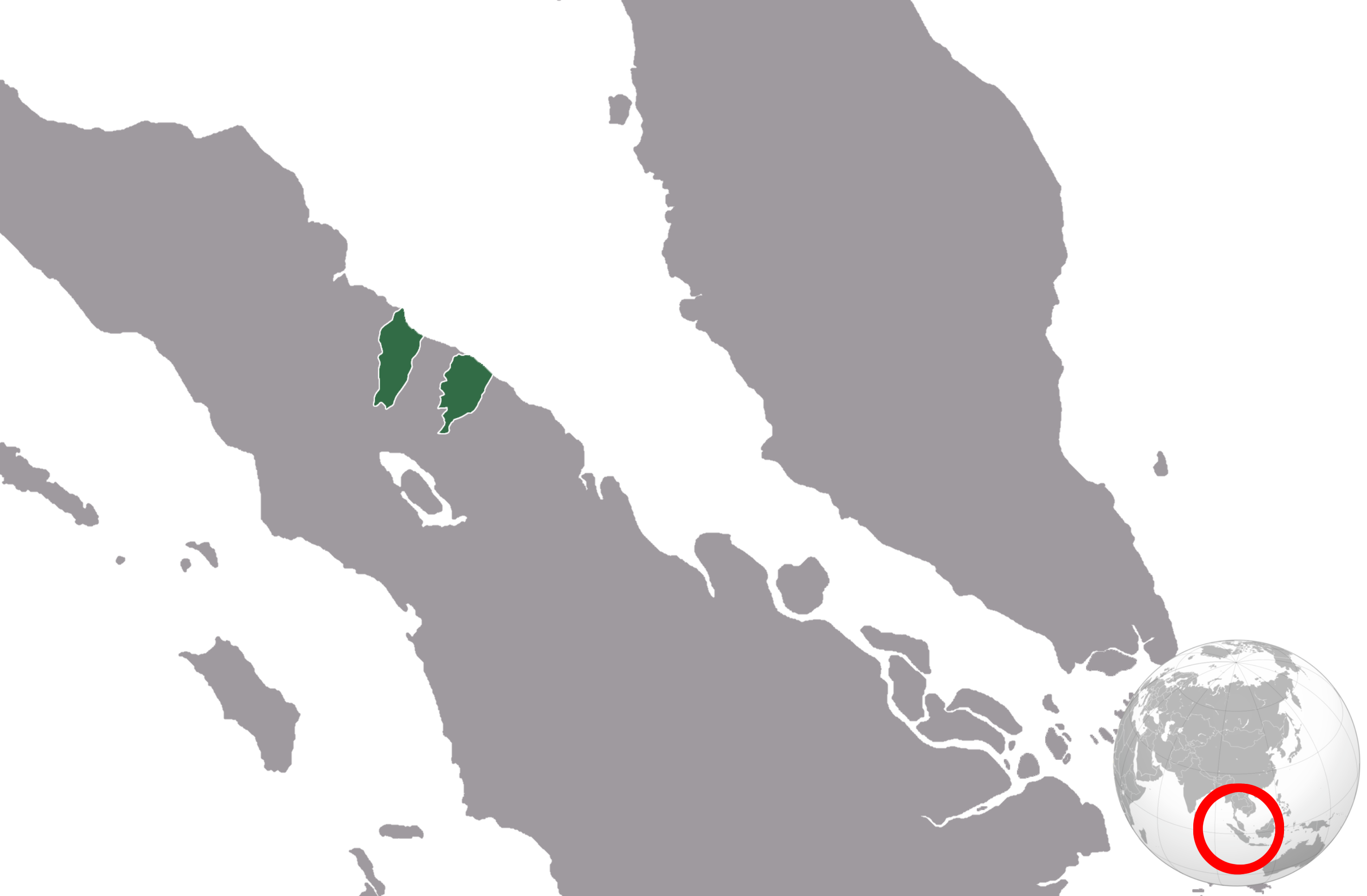
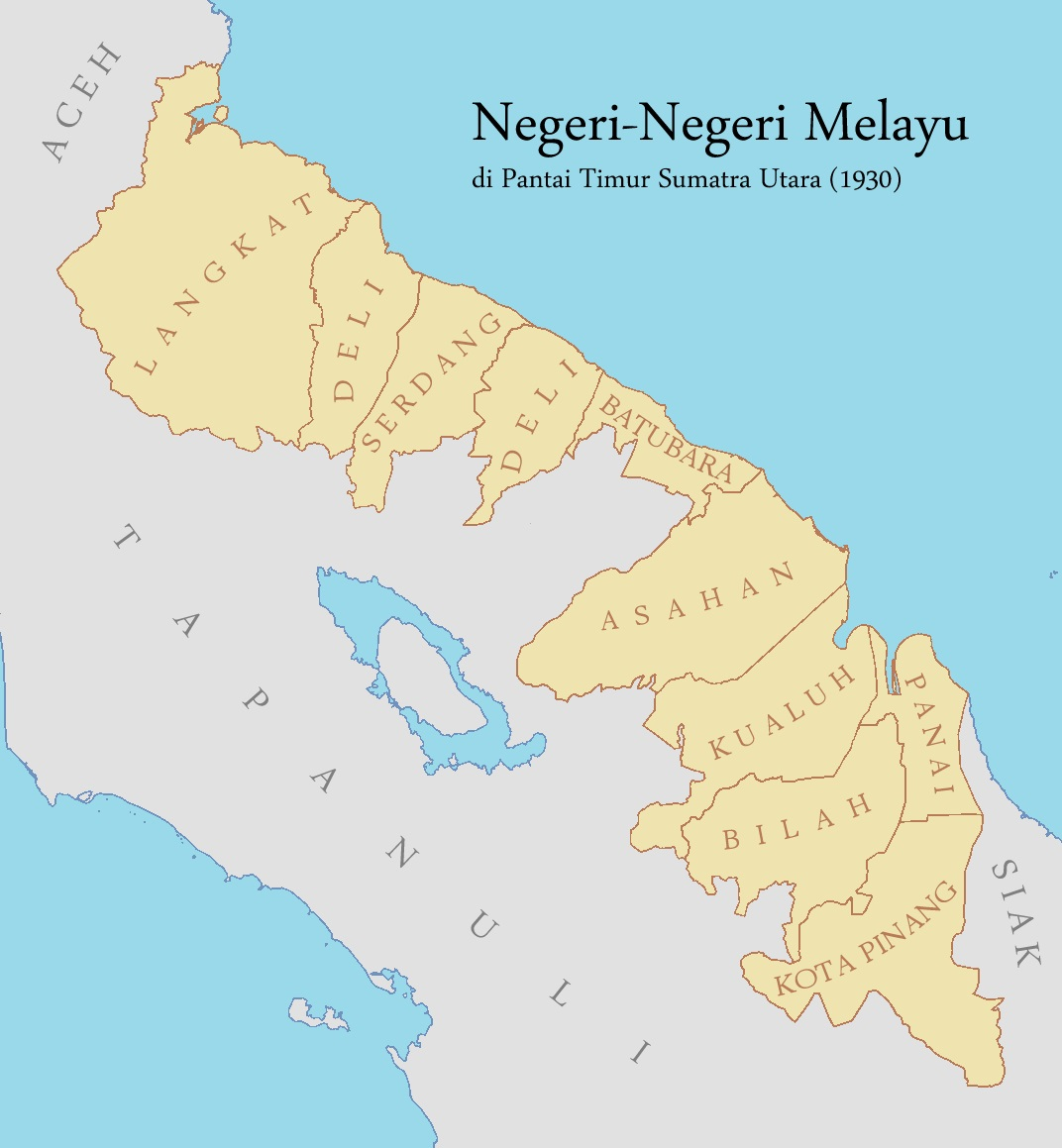
- Status: Protectorate of the Sultanate of Aceh (1632–1669); Protectorate of the Sultanate of Siak Sri Indrapura (1669–1814); Protectorate of the Dutch East Indies (1862–1946)
- Capital: Deli Tua; Labuhan Deli; Medan
- Common languages: Malay
- Religion: Sunni Islam
- Government: Monarchy
- Yang di-Pertuan Besar
  - 1632–1669: Tuanku Panglima Gocah Pahlawan
  - 1858–1873: Sultan Mahmud Al Rashid Perkasa Alam Shah
  - 1945–1967: Sultan Osman Al Sani Perkasa Alamsyah
  - 2005–present: Sultan Mahmud Lamanjiji Perkasa Alam
- History
  - Founded: 1632
  - Joined Republic of Indonesia: 1946
Preceded by	Succeeded by
Sultanate of Aceh	Indonesia
- Today part of: Indonesia

The Sultanate of Deli (Indonesian: Kesultanan Deli Darul Maimoon; Jawi: كسلطانن دلي دارالميمون) was a state in east Sumatra. It was founded in 1632 when a commander of the Aceh Sultanate, Gocah Pahlawan, conquered the area during the reign of Iskandar Muda. A tributary kingdom from 1630, it was controlled by various sultanates until 1814, when it became independent and broke away from the Sultanate of Siak. Dutch intervention in the mid-19th century resulted in a 1862 contract with the Dutch East Indies, which helped to recognise Deli's formal independence from Aceh and Siak. After Indonesian independence, the sultanate ceased to hold formal political authority. However, the sultanate remains a lasting symbol of the history of Medan.

== History ==
The history of the Sultanate of Deli and also the Sultanate of Serdang are closely related to the heyday of the Sultanate of Aceh during the administration of Sultan Iskandar Muda (1607–1636). Aceh started its expansion in 1612 by invading the cities along the East Coast of Sumatra. Deli harbour was conquered in six weeks, while the Kingdom of Aru, located in East Sumatra, surrendered in early 1613. In some works such as those of Tuanku Luckman Sinar Basarshah II who frequently wrote about the history of the kingdoms of East Sumatra, Aru is referred as Haru.

Aceh's conquest was led by Muhammad Dalik who assumed the title of Sri Paduka Tuanku Gocah Pahlawan. This Acehnese commander was a descendant of Amir Muhammad Badar ud-din Khan, a nobleman from India who married Princess Chandra Dewi, daughter of the Sultan of Samudera Pasai. Gocah Pahlawan (nicknamed Laksamana Kuda Bintan or Admiral Horse of Bintan) was believed to have led Acehnese troops against the Portuguese in 1629 and to conquer Pahang (1617), Kedah (1620), and Nias (1624), as well as some other areas.

=== Gocah Pahlawan, founder of the Sultanate of Deli (1632–1699) ===
Sultan Iskandar Muda granted the territory of Aru to Gocah Pahlawan. In 1632, Gocah Pahlawan was appointed the vice-regent of Iskandar Muda to rule the former territory of Aru. Acehnese interests in the occupation of Aru were:

1. To destroy the remaining resistance of Aru which was aided by the Portuguese;
2. Spread the teachings of Islam into the interior areas, and
3. Establish rule a larger zone of rulership under the Sultanate of Aceh.

Shortly after being appointed ruler of Aru representing Aceh, Gocah Pahlawan was appointed by the four kings of the Batak Karo urung (country) as a Datuk Tunggal or Ulon Janji, which was a position with an authority equivalent a prime minister or grand vizier. In the coronation, an oath to obey was pronounced by the Orang-orang Besar (nobility) and people for Gocah Pahlawan. At the same time, the Lembaga Datuk Berempat was established to serve as an advisory council for the government of Gocah Pahlawan. The four Batak Karo kings became members of this institution.

The four kings of Batak Karo were the leaders of the four kingdoms in the Batak Karo region that had accepted the teachings of Islam and who were conquered by Gocah Pahlawan for Aceh. One of the four Batak Karo kings is King Undo Sunggal who is also the father-in-law of Gocah Pahlawan. In 1632, Gocah Pahlawan married King Undo Sunggal's daughter, named Princess Nang Baluan Beru Surbakti.

Gocah Pahlawan died in 1641, and the control over Deli was bequeathed to his son, Tuanku Panglima Perunggit titled Panglima Deli. Meanwhile, Iskandar Muda had died in 1636 in Aceh. The leadership of the Sultanate of Aceh was passed to Iskandar Muda's son-in-law, skandar Thani, who was on the throne until 1641.

Aceh was weakened after Sultan Iskandar Thani died, so he was succeeded by his wife, Sultanah Safi al-Din Taj al-Alam. The instability of the Aceh court opened an opportunity for Tuanku Panglima Perunggit. In 1669, Tuanku Panglima Perunggit proclaimed independence from Aceh and established a connection with Dutch Malacca. Officially, the Sultanate of Deli established a sovereign government with the capital located in Labuhan, approximately 20 km north from Medan, the capital of North Sumatra province today.

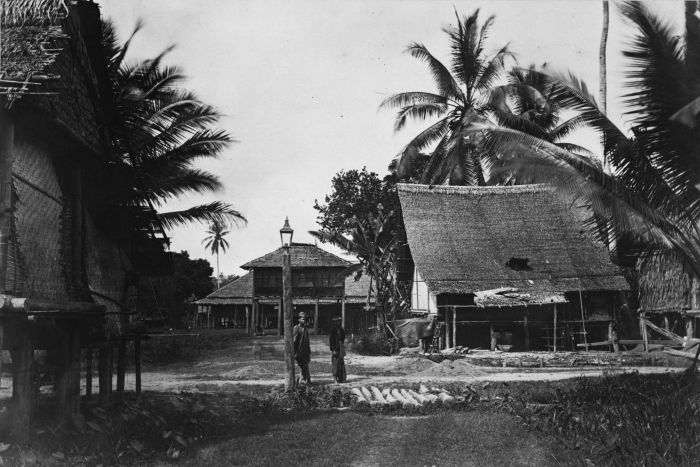
Labuhan, government centre of the first Sultanate of Deli.

The name of Deli had actually been listed in the archives of the VOC (Dutch East India Company) in Malacca, in the record of April 1641. This was the year when the Dutch seized Malacca from the Portuguese. In that record, it was stated that according to the report of the admiral of Johor, Aceh's army had gathered in Kuala Deli. At that time, the Sultanate of Aceh was involved in a conflict with the Sultanate of Johor which previously assisted the Portuguese and then the Dutch.

Another Dutch archive that mentions Deli is a record dated 9 September 1641 containing a letter from Sultanah Safi al-Din Taj al-Alam to the Governor-General Antonio van Diemen (1636–1645) in Batavia. In her letter, the Sultanah stated that the Dutch could trade up to Deli and Besitang. According to the VOC record in October 1644, a ruler titled Tuanku Panglima Deli had sent letters and gifts to the Dutch in Malacca, but the group's envoy had been robbed in Deli near Penaji River, the area of Malacca.

=== Fragmentation of the royal family (1700–1857) ===
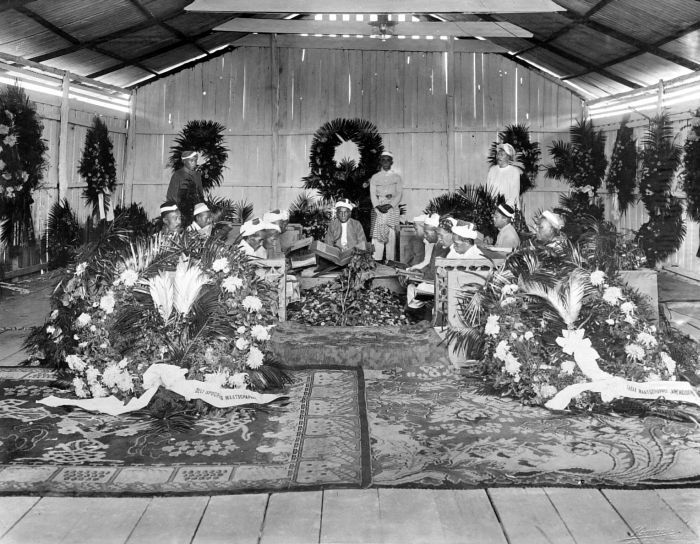
Sultan Ma'amun Al Rashid Perkasa Alam Shah's funeral

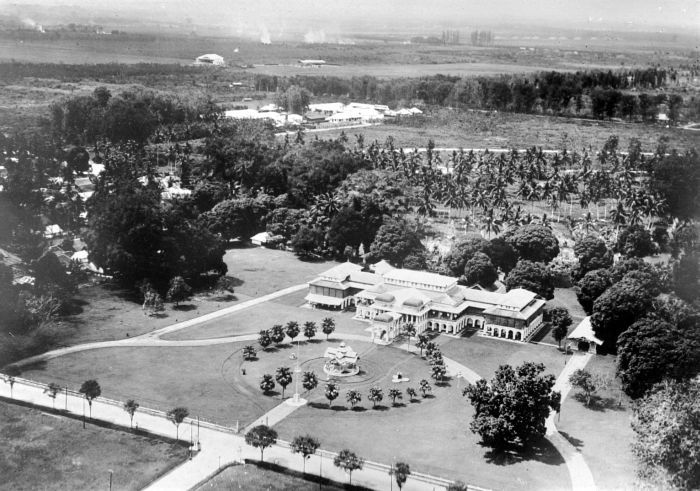
Aerial view of Maimoon Palace

The reigning sultan after Gocah Pahlawan, Tuanku Panglima Perunggit (or Panglima Deli) died in 1700. His successor was Tuanku Panglima Paderap who ruled until 1720 but the sultanate was shaken by internal fragmentation shortly after he died. His children engaged in a struggle for the throne of Deli.

Despite his status as the oldest child, Tuanku Jalaludin Gelar Kejuruan Metar was excluded from the throne as his eyes were impaired. This situation made Tuanku Panglima Pasutan, second son of Panglima Deli, willing to take over the throne despite the fact that the right to assume the next leadership was to the fourth son, Tuanku Umar Johan Alamsyah Gelar Kejeruan Junjongan (Tuanku Umar for short) as he was born from the queen. What result was a civil war between the two sons. Meanwhile, Tuanku Tawar (Arifin) Gelar Kejuruan Santun chose to avoid the war between the two brothers and opened a country in Denai which later expanded to Serbajadi.

In the civil war that culminated in 1732, Tuanku Panglima Pasutan successfully deposed his brother, Tuanku Umar, expelling him from the palace. Tuanku Umar was forced with his mother, Tuanku Panglima Sampali (the queen of Tuanku Panglima Paderap), to take refuge until they arrived at Kampung Besar (Serdang) and so Tuanku Panglima Pasutan freely declared himself as the new Sultan of Deli.

In 1723, Tuanku Umar Johan Alamsyah founded the Sultanate of Serdang and was crowned its first monarch. The kingdom was built on vital regional alliances, drawing support from the Karo Batak rulers of Sunggal and Senembah, the Batak Timur ruler of Tanjong Morawa, and Aceh's Kejeruan Lumu. Serdang's territory was further consolidated when Tuanku Umar's brother, Tuanku Tawar (Arifin) Kejeruan Santun, annexed his independent settlement of Denai into Serdang.

The unstable internal conditions in Deli encouraged conquest by neighbouring states, such as from the Sultanate of Siak Sri Indrapura, Johor and Aceh. The profitable Deli region, known for perfume, sandalwood and camphor, was also supported from Dutch exports of rice, textiles, candles and horses from Deli. Due to their economic interests, the Dutch felt the need to maintain good relations with the Deli authorities.

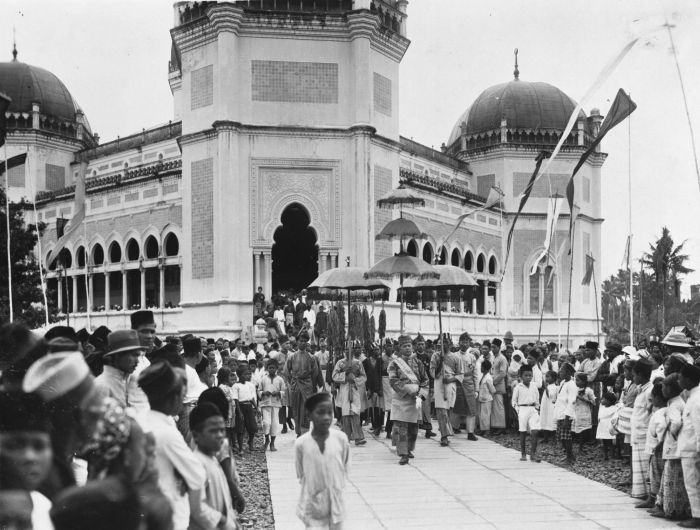
Amaluddin Sani Perkasa Alam Shah, Sultan of Deli, leaving the Great Mosque on the day of his cornonation

Tuanku Panglima Pasutan, the fourth Sultan of Deli died in 1761. The successive ruler was Panglima Gandar Wahid, but he died in 1805 and was succeeded by Tuanku Amaluddin. Since Deli was still under the influence of the Siak at the time, the coronation of Tuanku Amaluddin as the Sultan of Deli was based on a certificate dated 8 August 1814 issued by the sultan of Siak. After officially becoming the Sultan of Deli, Tuanku Panglima Amaludin obtained an honorary title as Sultan Panglima Mangedar Alam.

In 1669, the Deli was captured by Siak from Aceh but when Siak was subjected to Johor, Deli became under the control of Johor.

In 1854, Aceh managed to rule again over the Sultanate of Deli, it was taken by Teuku Husin. Sultan Osman Perkasa Alam Shah (1850–1858), the Sultan of Deli at the time, was taken to the palace of Aceh. But then Deli was acknowledged again as the Aceh Sultanate Darussalam, ruled by Sulaiman Shah (1838–1857). Under the Sultanate of Aceh, Deli's territory was defined between the borders of Rokan to the south to the border of Tamiang.

=== Deli under Siak and the Dutch East Indies (1860–1906) ===
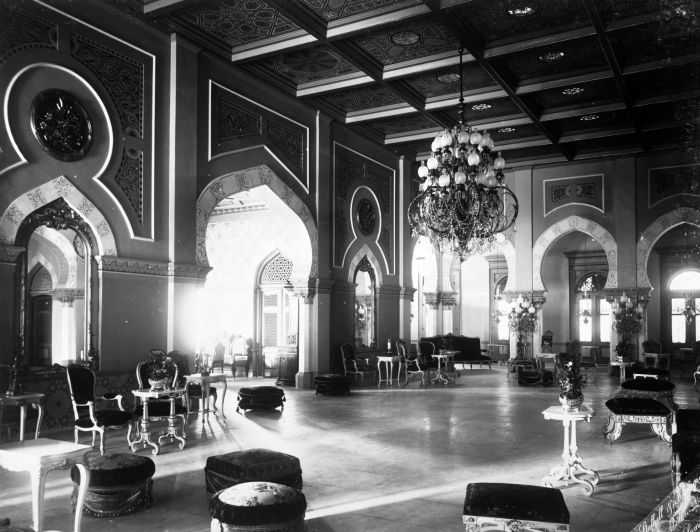
Interior of Istana Maimun, the Sultan of Deli's palace

Throughout August 1862, Elisa Netscher who served as the Resident of Riau, accompanied by the Assistant Resident of Siak and some rulers of the Siak, travelled to East Sumatra by request of Siak as several East Sumatran kingdoms were reluctant to acknowledge Siak's power over others including Deli. These East Sumatran sultanates tend to lean closer to Aceh as Siak was considered weaker.

On 21 August 1862, Elisha Netscher and the group entered Kuala Sungai Deli and was greeted by Sultan Mahmud Al Rashid Perkasa Alam Shah. The Deli sultan planned to sever relations with Siak and would ask for recognition from anyone. However, Netscher continuously persuaded that the influence of Siak over Deli would not be lost by declaring that "the State of Deli follow Siak under protection by the Dutch East Indies government". Since then, Deli was tied in a political contract with the Dutch.

The regime of Sultan Mahmud Al Rashid Perkasa Alam Shah (Mahmud for short) ended in 1873 and was succeeded by his son, Sultan Makmun Al Rashid Perkasa Alam. During the leadership of the ninth sultan, Deli experienced a period of prosperity, deriving its revenue from tobacco plantation and the growth of the Deli Company and other foreign entrepreneurs who opened tobacco plantations here. Even by 1872, 13 foreign-owned plantations had already operated in Deli as its soil was suitable for growing world-class quality tobacco. This sold well in the European market for cigar making.

When Sultan Mahmud began to occupy the throne of Deli in 1873, the number of tobacco plantations in Deli had increased to 44 estates. Tobacco crops harvested in 1874 reached 125,000 packs and made Deli one of the largest tobacco producers in the world, and Amsterdam became the largest tobacco market in the world. Payment from the plantations and land rents from foreign entrepreneurs made the Sultan of Deli very rich.

At this time, Sultan Mahmud built a symbol of the triumph of the Sultanate of Deli, among others, Kampong Bahari (Labuhan) in 1886 and the Maimoon Grand Palace in 1888. His successor, Sultan Ma`mun Al Rashid Perkasa Alam Shah, who reigned from 1873, continued these modern construction projects by founding the Mahkamah Kerapatan Besar building in 1903 and the Great Mosque of Sultan Al Mansun in 1906. The Maimoon Palace was built in the centre of Medan and inhabited by the sultans of Deli and their families since 18 May 1891. Earlier, the sultans and his family lived in Kampong Bahari in Labuhan. The architect of this palace was KNIL soldier Captain Theodoor van Erp.

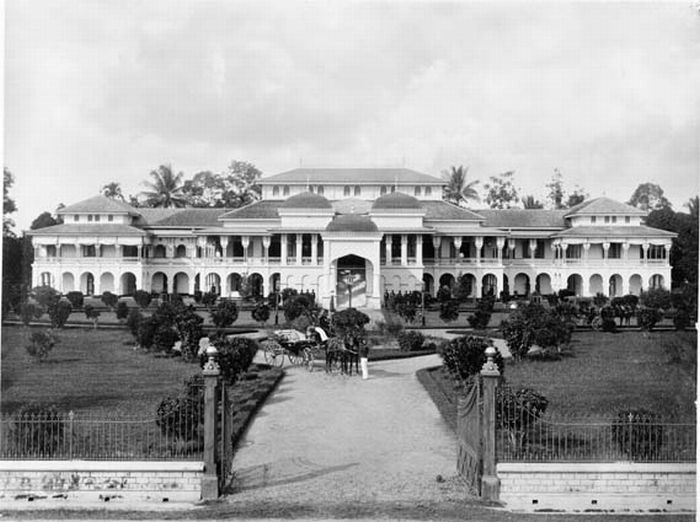
Maimoon Palace, the symbol of the Sultanate of Deli prosperity.

The civil war between Deli and Serdang ended in the early 20th century after pressure from the Dutch. The Deli-Dutch relationship was quite consistent due to their mutual benefits of allying to each other: the Dutch brought different types of natural resources from Deli, while Deli required security guarantees. Their relationship gradually improved when Deli was under Siak.

=== Post-independence ===
After Indonesia proclaimed its independence in 1945, and later was recognised by the Netherlands in 1949, the Sultanate of Deli, which originally sat within the State of East Sumatra, since 1950 was merged into the province of North Sumatra. The Deli royal family, like many royal families in northern Sumatra, were threatened due to perception as Dutch stooges and whom belonging to the feudal class.

Incitement to rebel had been rumoured since June 1942 during the era of Japanese occupation in Indonesia. Acts of violence against the nobility reached its peak during the 1946 Indonesian National Revolution. Several North Sumatran royalty were murdered and robbed of their property and belongings, including Tengku Amir Hamzah, the Indonesian poet who was beheaded in Kuala Begumit. The royal family of Deli and Serdang survived thanks to the preservation of the Allied soldiers. Post-revolution, the family and heirs of the Sultanate of Deli occupied the Maimoon Palace as a residence as almost all the other palaces had either been destroyed or burnt. Maimoon Palace survived destruction as it was guarded by Allied soldiers during the Social Revolution.

While the Sultanate of Deli still existed post-independence, it no longer has any political authority. Entering the New Order era, the sultanate was ruled by Sultan Azmy Perkasa Alam Alhaj who was on the throne from 1967 until 1998. Since 5 May 1998, Sultan Otteman Mahmud Perkasa Alam served as a functionary of the sultanate. However, the 13th sultan of Deli who was a lieutenant colonel in the Indonesian Army died in an Army CN235 plane crash at Malikus Saleh Airport, Lhokseumawe, Aceh, on 21 July 2005. The next day, the Crown Prince inherited the throne as the 14th sultan of Deli and assumed the title as Sultan Mahmud Lamanjiji Perkasa Alam.

== List of sultans ==
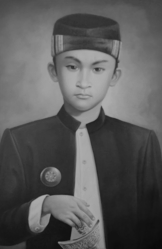
Sultan Mahmud Lamanjiji Perkasa Alam

- Tuanku Panglima Gocah Pahlawan (1632–1669)
- Tuanku Panglima Perunggit (1669–1698)
- Tuanku Panglima Paderap (1698–1728)
- Tuanku Panglima Pasutan (1728–1761)
- Tuanku Panglima Gandar Wahid (1761–1805)
- Sultan Amaluddin Mangendar (1805–1850)
- Sultan Osman Perkasa Alam Shah (1850–1858)
- Sultan Mahmud Al Rashid Perkasa Alamsyah (1858–1873)
- Sultan Ma'mun Al Rashid Perkasa Alamyah (1873–1924)
- Sultan Amaluddin Al Sani Perkasa Alamsyah (1924–1945)
- Sultan Osman Al Sani Perkasa Alamsyah (1945–1967)
- Sultan Azmy Perkasa Alam Alhaj (1967–1998)
- Sultan Otteman Mahmud Perkasa Alam (5 May 1998 – 21 July 2005)
- Sultan Mahmud Lamanjiji Perkasa Alam (since 22 July 2005 – present)

== Family tree ==
Family Tree of Deli Monarchs

Gocah; Pahlawan^{(1)} r. 1632-1641
Perunggit^{(2)} r. 1641-1700
Paderap^{(3)} r. 1700-1728
Pasutan^{(4)} r. 1728-1761	Umar Johan; Pahlawan; Alam Syah; Serdang^{(1)} r. 1723-1782
Gandar; Wahid^{(5)} r. 1761-1805	Sultanate of Serdang
Amaluddin I Mangendar; Alam^{(6)} r. 1805-1850
Osman I Perkasa; Alam Syah^{(7)} r. 1850-1858
Mahmud; Al Rasyid; Perkasa; Alam Syah^{(8)} r. 1858-1873
Ma'mun; Al Rasyid; Perkasa; Alam Syah^{(9)} r. 1873-1924
Amaluddin II; Perkasa; Alam Syah^{(10)} r. 1924-1945
Osman II; Perkasa; Alam Syah^{(11)} r. 1945-1967
Azmi; Perkasa; Alam Al Haj^{(12)} r. 1967-1998
Osman III; Mahmud; Ma'mun; Paderap; Perkasa; Alam Syah^{(13)} r. 1998-2005
Mahmud Aria; Lamanjiji; Perkasa; Alam Syah^{(14)} r. 2005-present

== Territory ==
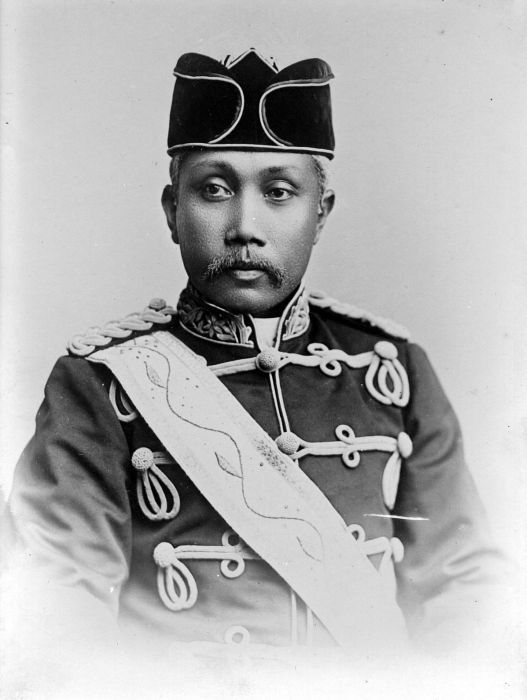
Portrait of Sultan Ma'mun Al Rasyid Perkasa Alam, 1900s.

The territory of the Sultanate of Deli included Labuhan Deli, Langkat, Suka Piring, Buluh Cina, Denai, Serbajadi, and several other regions around the east coast of Sumatra Island. When the Sultanate of Aceh regained control in 1854, Deli was proclaimed under the control of Aceh and its territory was assigned between the borders of Rokan to the south to the border of Tamiang (Meuraxa, 1956:25).

During the Dutch colonial government, according to the political contract between the Sultanate of Deli with the colonial government, the sultanate's territories included:

- The area under the direct rule of the sultan (kotapraja/capital).
- Urung (State) XII Kota Hamparan Perak led by Datuk Hamparan Perak Setia Diraja.
- Urung Serbanyaman-Sunggal led by Datuk Sunggal Sri Indera Pahlawan.
- Urung Sukapiring-Kampung Baru led by Datuk Sukapiring Sri Indera Asmara.
- Urung Senembah-Petumbak led by Kejeruan Senembah Deli.
- Percut State led by Kejeruan Percut Paduka Raja.
- Jajahan Negeri Bedagai led by Pangeran Nara Kelana Raja Bedagai.
- Jajahan Negeri Padang led by Maharaja Negeri Padang (Sinar, 2007:29–30).

In general, the sultanate's territory was divided into two, namely the Hilir region which was inhabited by Malay people who had converted to Islam, and the Hulu region which was inhabited by the Karo tribes who mostly had not been converted to Islam or still held the faith of their ancestors.

== Governance system ==
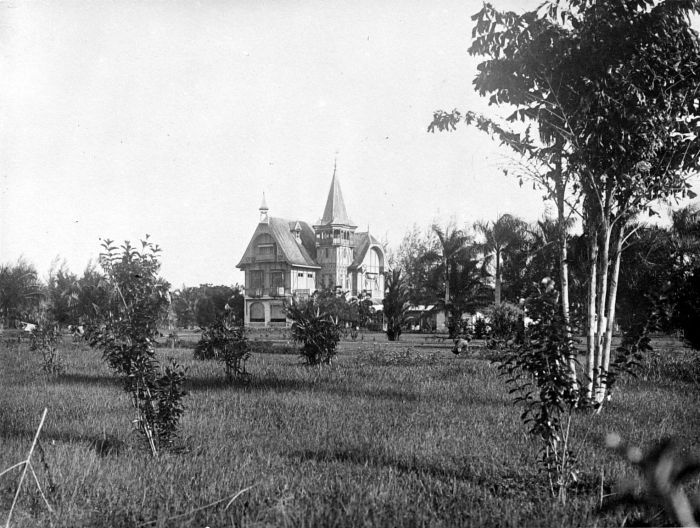
The palace of the Tengku Besar (crown prince) of Deli

Since founded by Gocah Pahlawan, the Sultanate of Deli already had a Lembaga Datuk Berempat that served as a government advisory board. At that time, the Lembaga Datuk Berempat posts consisted of four Karo Batak Kings that had supported Deli since its declaration as an independent kingdom. The Lembaga Datuk Berempat also had a central role in the coronation ceremony of the Deli sultans.

As the supreme authority, the Sultan of Deli did not only perform his duties as a head of state and government, but also served as the chief of religious affairs as well as Malays custom chief. In executing his duty, the Sultan of Deli was aided by treasurer, harbormaster, and the imperial servants whom each have their specific roles and duties.

During the Dutch colonial era, the governmental system of the Sultanate of Deli was tied through a political agreement. Sejarah Medan Tempo Doeloe (2007), written by Tengku Luckman Sinar, mentions that the political agreement between the Dutch and the Sultanate of Deli was divided into:

- Acte van Verband (Confinement Certificate). The certificate mentioned that:
1. the Sultan of Deli, as well as his successor, willing to execute the agreement between the Dutch and the Sultanate of Deli,
2. the Sultan of Deli will be obedient and loyal to the Netherlands Queen/Governor-General of the Dutch East Indies and implemented appropriate governance according to Deli's custom and regulations,
3. the Sultan of Deli willing to promote the country and the people, and
4. the Sultan of Deli willing to comply with additional requirements that were not yet clear or not listed in the certificate. This certificate was signed by Dutch government officials and Orang-orang Besar of Deli as witnesses.
- Acte van Bevestiging (Deed of Confirmation). This certificate stated that the Dutch Government (Governor-General) acknowledged the Sultan as the king of Deli and this recognition was also mentioned in the Ordinance of the Dutch East Indies.

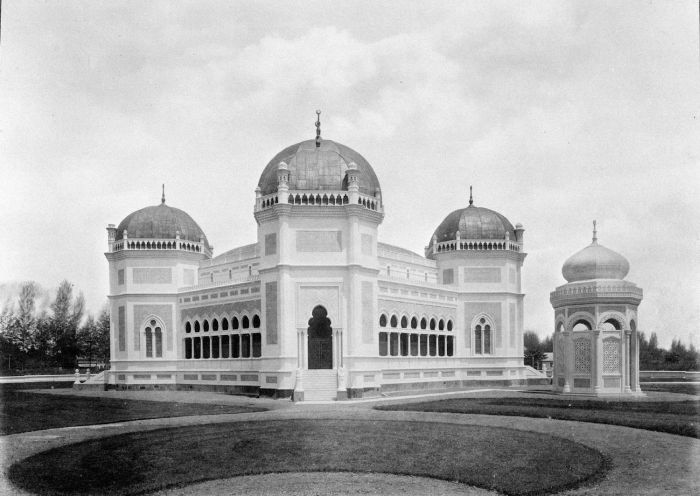
Al Mahsun Grand Mosque was built at the peak of Deli prosperity.

The governance of the Sultanate of Deli was executed by the Sultan of Deli, together with the Dewan Orang-orang Besar (as a replacement for the Lembaga Datuk Berempat) which consisted of four Urung and Kejeruan Percut after consultation and with the guidance of the Resident as the representative of the Dutch East Indies colonial government. The Orang-orang Besar was appointed and dismissed by the Sultan of Deli after consulted the Resident with respect to customs regulations. In addition, the Resident had the right to attend meetings of the Orang-orang Besar (Sinar, 2007:30). The Sultanate of Deli also had several important institutions supporting the governance. Some of them were the judiciary or Kerapatan Besar, Autonomous Police of Deli, and the Religious Courts.

== See also ==
- Deli Serdang Regency
- Sultanate of Serdang
