= Medan Sunggal =

Coordinates: 3.575358°N 98.614345°E

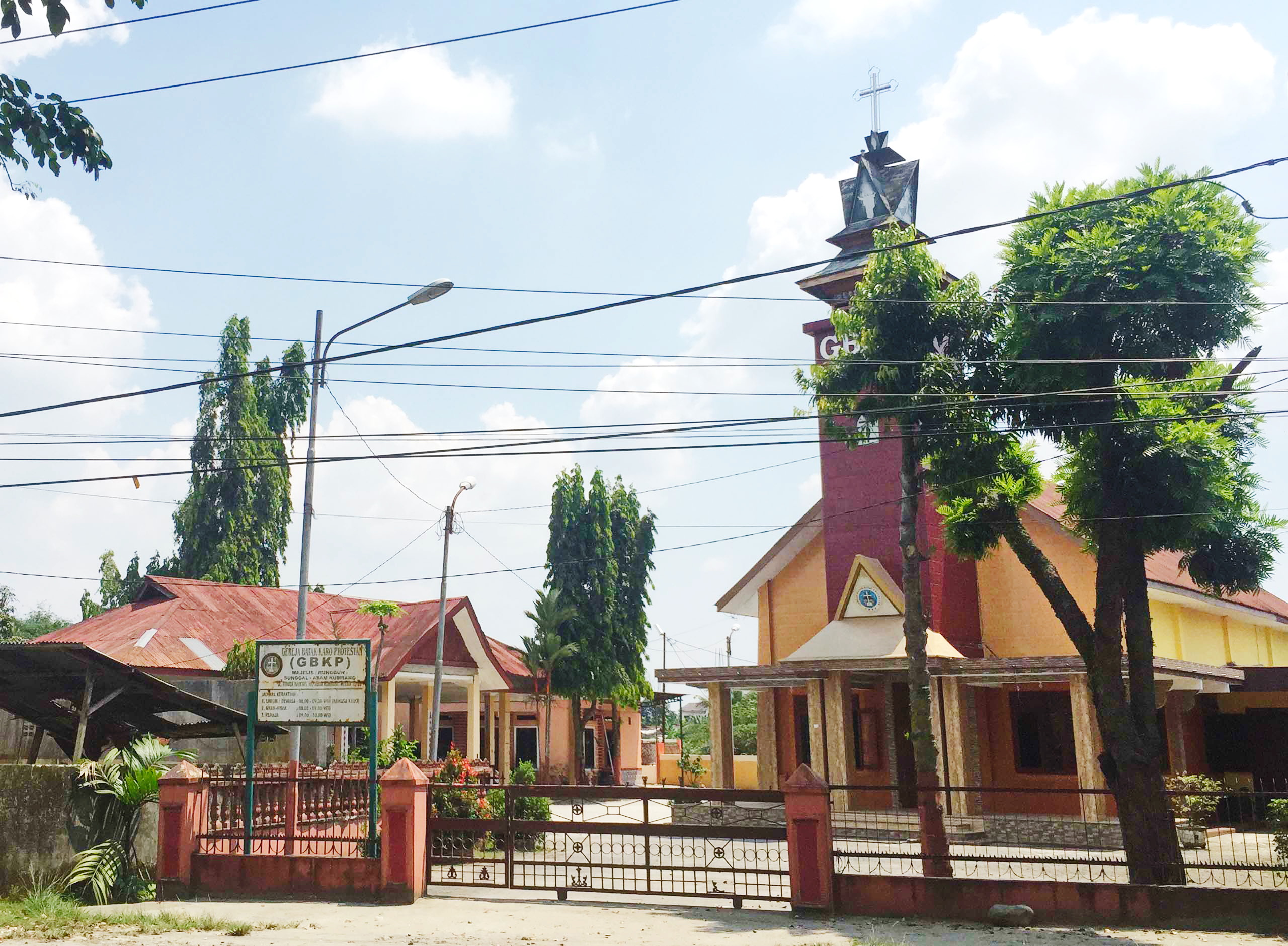
GBKP Sunggal - Asam Kumbang

Medan Sunggal is one of the 21 administrative districts in the city of Medan, North Sumatra, Indonesia. It is home to two shopping malls: Manhattan Times Square (not Manhattan Times Square in New York, although the name is inspired by the place), and Ring Road City Walks.

The district of Medan Sunggal is bordered by:

- Deli Serdang Regency, to the west
- Medan Baru, to the east
- Medan Selayang, to the south
- Medan Helvetia towards the north

It covers an area of 13.34 sq.km and at the 2010 Census it had a population of 112,744.

== Administrative divisions ==
Medan Sunggal district is divided into six subdistricts (kelurahan):

1. Babura Sunggal
2. Lalang
3. Sei Sikambing B
4. Simpang Tanjung
5. Sunggal
6. Tanjung Rejo
