= Aru kingdom =

Kingdom in Sumatra

Aru Kingdom كراجأن ارو
- 1225–1613
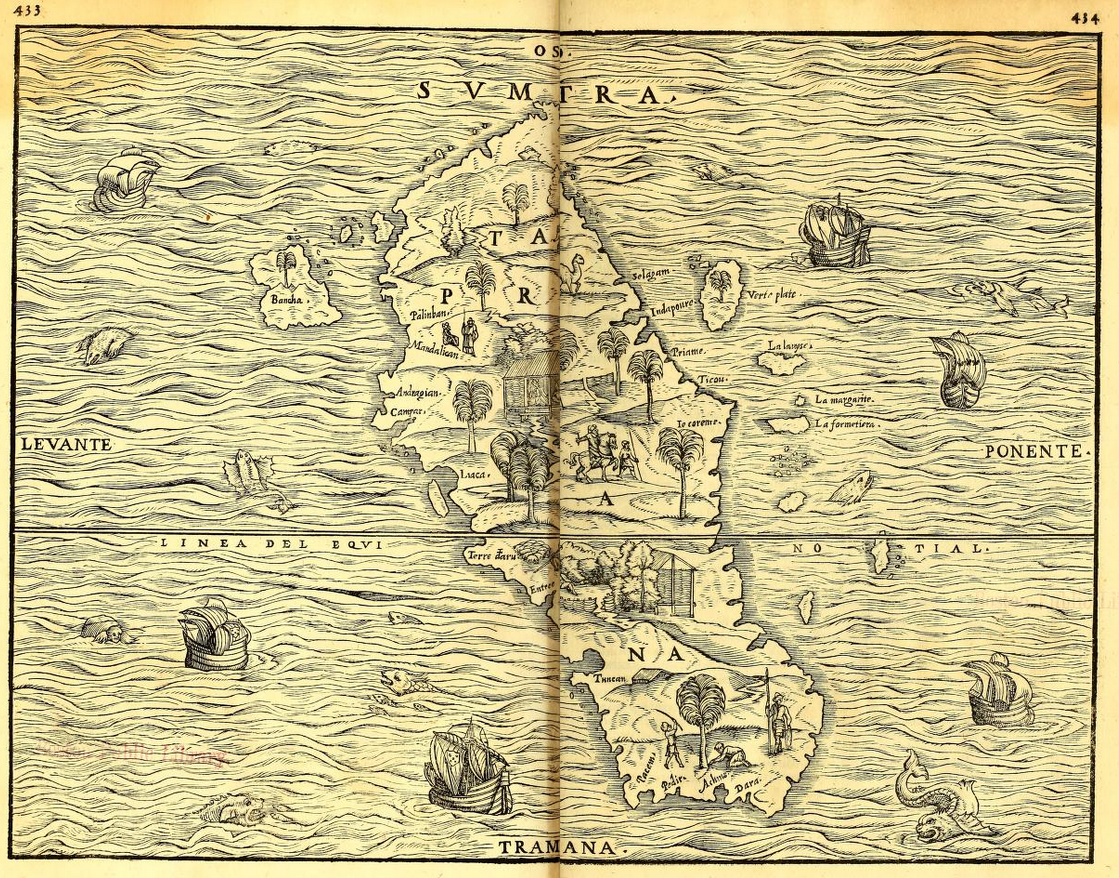
- 1565 map of Sumatra with south orientation on top, showing "Terre Laru" on center-lower left
- Capital: Kota Rentang
- Common languages: Old Malay
- Religion: Islam (official), Animism, Hinduism
- Government: Monarchy
- History
  - Established: 1225
  - Defeat by the Sultanate of Aceh: 1613
Succeeded by
Sultanate of Deli
- Today part of: Indonesia

Aru (كراجأن ارو; or Haru) was a major Malay Sumatran kingdom from the 13th to the 16th century. It was located on the eastern coast of North Sumatra, Indonesia. In its heyday the kingdom was a formidable maritime power, and was able to control the northern part of the Malacca strait.

The kingdom was initially established as a Melayu polity. The indigenous population practiced native animism as well as Hinduism. During the 13th century, Islam came to be practiced alongside the existing faiths. Aru's capital was located close to present-day Medan and Deli Serdang. The people of the kingdom are believed to have been descendants of the Malay from the interior of North Sumatra.

== Location ==
Traditionally, the location of Haru or Aru is connected to the site of its successor state, the Sultanate of Deli, which was in and around the city of Medan and Deli Serdang today, as suggested by British orientalist Winstedt. However, Groenveldt, a Dutch historian, has suggested that the center of the Haru Kingdom was located further southeast, near the estuary of the Barumun and Panai Rivers, in Labuhan Batu Regency, and is thus related and connected to the earlier Pannai Kingdom. Gilles suggested that the capital was located near Belawan Harbour, while another opinion suggested the estuary of the Wampu River by Haru Bay, Langkat Regency.

The Kota Cina site in Medan Marelan, and Benteng Putri Hijau in Deli Tua, Namorambe, Deli Serdang Regency, are archaeological sites near Medan, which are connected to the Aru Kingdom. The Benteng Putri Hijau archaeological site is under threat of residential development. Another archaeological site is Kota Rentang in Hamparan Perak area, Deli Serdang Regency, which archaeological experts have suggested was the capital of Aru Kingdom.

== Historiography ==
The earliest historical record mentioning the Haru kingdom was a Chinese chronicle dated from the Yuan dynasty (late 13th century). There is another Chinese record from a later period, the Yingya Shenglan (1416) of the Ming dynasty. The Kingdom of Haru was also mentioned in two Javanese records, the Nagarakretagama (1365) and Pararaton (c. 15th century). The Malay Annals mentioned Haru as one of a few influential kingdoms in the region, whose prestige rivaled that of Pasai and the Malacca Sultanate. The Portuguese record Suma Oriental written in the early 16th century mentioned Aru as a prosperous kingdom.

== History ==
=== Formation ===
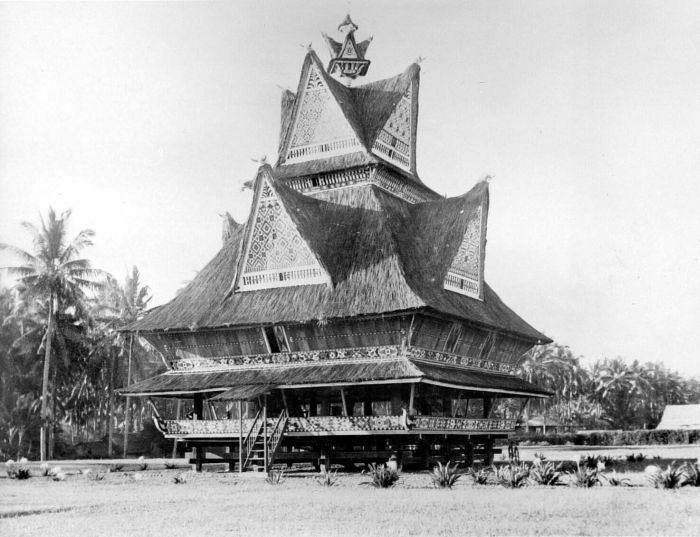
An imposing traditional Karo house. The people of the Aru Kingdom are believed have been from the same stock as the Karo people of Tanah Karo

The people of Aru are believed to be the descendants of, or related to, the Karo tribe which inhabits the Tanah Karo further inland. This suggestion is based on a plausible etymology of similar sounding names, between "Aru" or "Haru" with "Karo".

The Benteng Putri Hijau archaeological site, at an ancient fortress near Medan, shows several layers of cultures estimated to date from between the 12th and 18th centuries. The fort is in the Karo and wider Batak tribes' tradition of constructing huta or kuta, a walled compound completed with parik (moat) as a defensive structure to protect the village against incessant tribal warfare. Artifacts found include stone tools, Chinese ceramics, tin bullets and Aceh coins. A fragment of lingam was discovered at the nearby site of Sukanalu, suggesting that the population of Aru adhered to both native animism and Hinduism prior to Islam entering the region.

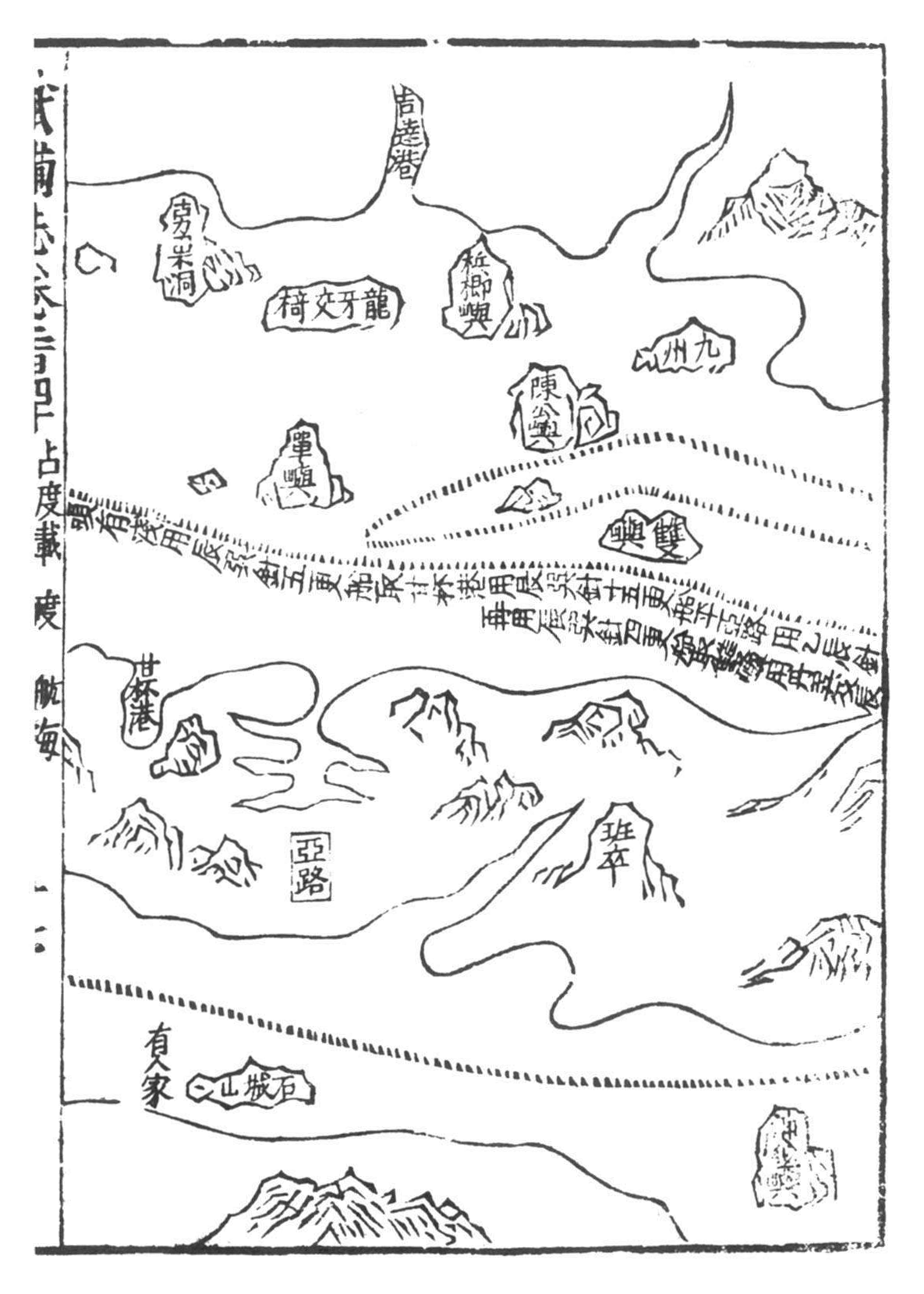
Mao Kun map showing part of the island of Sumatra and the Aru Kingdom at its bottom (亞路)

The Haru Kingdom was mentioned in a Chinese chronicle of the Yuan dynasty. According to this source, in 1282, Kublai Khan demanded that Haru submit to China's suzerainty, and Haru responded graciously by sending tribute to Yuan's court in 1295. Marco Polo, however, did not mention Aru in his report as one of the eight kingdoms of Sumatra during his journey in 1292.

The Haru Kingdom is mentioned in two Javanese sources originating from circa the 14th century. According to Pararaton, Haru kingdom was mentioned among polities that Gajah Mada intended to unite under Majapahit suzerainty in his Palapa oath. In 1339 a Javanese Majapahit naval expedition attacked several coastal states in Sumatra; although it failed to capture Samudera Pasai, the Javanese expedition did manage to gain control of Haru and Pane (Pannai). The Nagarakretagama (1365) canto 13 mentioned Aru as one of Majapahit vassal states in Sumatra.

According to Hikayat Raja-raja Pasai and the Malay Annals the Aru kingdom was Islamized by Nakhoda Ismail and Fakir Muhammad; they also converted Merah Silu, the first king of Samudera Pasai in the mid-13th century. According to Yingya Shenglan (1416), a Chinese Ming dynasty report composed by Ma Huan about the Zheng He expedition, the king of Haru and his subjects had embraced Islam. After the 13th century, Islam slowly began to gain followers among the population of Aru. However, native animism or paganism is still pervasive, especially amongst the population of the interior region, and a few Hindus still survive.

=== Growth ===
The map of Malacca Sultanate, Aru shown on the east coast of North Sumatra, southeast from Peureulak

The discovery of Muslim headstones at burial sites in Kota Rentang suggests that the ruling elites of Aru Kingdom, the King and his family, has converted to Islam. These Islamic headstones are made from volcanic tuff with Arabic Jawi script similar to those found in Aceh and other Malay states. The site is in Kota Rentang in Hamparan Perak, Deli Serdang, believed to be the location of the capital of the Aru kingdom. Numerous artifacts have been discovered at this site, including Islamic headstones, ceramics and pottery fragments from China, Thailand and Sri Lanka, and Arabic coins from the 13th and 14th century. Other discoveries include traces of timberworks, building stones and the remnants of a wooden ship.

In the 15th century, the Malay Annals mentioned the Haru kingdom as one of a few influential kingdoms in the region, with its prestige rivaling those of Pasai and the Malacca Sultanate. During that period, the kingdom was a formidable maritime power controlling the northern part of the Malacca Strait.

Both the Malaccan Malay and Portuguese sources mention the demographic split, and sometimes rivalry, between the Muslim minority of the coast and the native pagan heathen majority of the island, with their notorious practice of cannibalism. According to Afonso de Albuquerque the rulers of the small kingdoms of northern Sumatra and the Sultans of Malacca used to have cannibals as executioners, reserved as a punishment for special crimes: "There are in Malacca ... others are boiled, others are roasted and given to eat to peoples who are like savages and come from a country called Aru."

The Portuguese record Suma Oriental, written in the early 16th century mentions Aru as a prosperous kingdom with plenty of rice, meat, fish and wine. The kingdom was also rich in camphor, benzoin, gold, lignaloes, rattan, honey and slaves. According to the Suma Oriental, Aru governed a town in the land of Arqat, where a large slave market was held in certain months. Many people went there to buy slaves, while other people went there to pay ransom to buy the freedom of their relatives who were being sold as slaves. The coastal area of Aru kingdom was infested with Celates robbers.

Duarte Barbosa (1480–1521) wrote in 1516 that the kingdom of Aru was ruled by cannibal adherents of paganism. Two decades later, Mendes Pinto also recorded the presence of the people of "Aaru" on the northeast coast of Sumatra where he also visited the local Muslim king.

=== Decline ===
The conquest by Iskandar Muda of Aceh, 1608–1637. The Kingdom of Aru was defeated by Aceh in 1613

Aru steadily grew weaker in the 16th century, caught in a regional rivalry between more powerful neighbours — Portuguese Malacca and the Sultanate of Aceh. Because of the incessant pressure from Aceh in the early 16th century the capital of Aru moved inland, from coastal Kota Rentang to Benteng Putri Hijau. The fall of the port city of Kota Rentang to Aceh probably took place in 1539. Some historians suggest that this event marked the end of the Aru kingdom as a maritime power. Aru's influence was reduced and its influence became regional at best, and ceased to exist in the early 17th century due to various factors; including the rivalry with Aceh and other neighboring polities in Sumatra and Malay peninsula, coupled with the loss of its coastal port that isolated the kingdom from the global maritime trading network.

In 1564, Aru kingdom was defeated by Ottomans during the Ottoman expedition to Aceh. In 1613, the ambitious and warlike Sultan Iskandar Muda of Aceh, strike a final blow to seal the fate of Aru kingdom. The discovery of tin bullets suggests that Benteng Putri Hijau was a battle site. Aru kingdom was dissolved in the early 17th century. Its successor state was the Deli which was reduced to the status of an Aceh protectorate (1632–1669) and later conquered by Siak (1669–1854).

== Society ==
=== Religion ===
Within the Kingdom of Aru, there were three religions recognised by its people: Islam, the faith adhered to by kingdom's elites, the royal family and coastal society; Hinduism adhered to by Tamil settlers; and native pagan animism practiced by the Karonese population of the hinterland. The Kingdom of Aru was initially built upon the larger Karo society, which was a pagan animist culture. The traditional animist belief system of Karonese is called Pemena.

The Chinese Ming source Yingya Shenglan (1416) mentioned that the King of Aru and his subjects had embraced Islam. The conversion to Islam most likely took place earlier, probably in the late 13th century. Islamic gravestones discovered in Kota Rentang confirmed that Islamic society had taken firm root in the kingdom.

Archaeological excavation has uncovered fragments of lingam, which suggests that part of Aru's society, possibly Tamil settlers, adhered to Hinduism. Tamil traders settled in the kingdom, bringing Hindu influences with them, and they had integrated into Aru society.

=== Economy and way of life ===
The people of Aru made their living by fishing and farming. However, since their lands were not suitable for rice farming, most of them grew coconuts and bananas instead, or forest commodities such as rattan, camphor and frankincense. They raised poultry, ducks and goats, and they consumed milk. When they went into the forest, they used poisonous arrows and bows for protection. Both men and women covered their bodies by wrapping their lower limbs in cloth, however the upper parts were left uncovered. They traded their commodities for foreign goods, including Chinese ceramics, silk and colourful beads.

Archaeological findings and artifacts show that the Aru kingdom had established trading relations with India and China. According to a Chinese source, compared to Malacca and Pasai, Aru was not a great center of commerce. It seems that Aru failed to compete with Malacca and Pasai to attract regional and global Muslim traders. This led Aru kings to occasionally turn to piracy and raiding, aided by the Orang Laut, sea folk aligned to Aru.

=== Culture ===
The Chinese sources mention that the culture of Aru, areas such as customs, marriage and funeral traditions, language and trade, are quite similar to those of Malacca, Pasai and Java. The natural resources and commodities being traded there are also similar to those of the other polities in the region.

According to the Malay Annals, Aru kingdom adopted the etiquette and culture of the Malay court; their kings used Malay styles and titles such as "Raja Pahlawan" and "Sri Indra". However, this Malay acculturation was not complete, as traces of non-Malay culture, the native Karonese elements, survive to this day.

Aru maintained close cultural and trading relations with their kin in the hinterland – the Karo people of Karoland – at a time when they still practiced a native form of animism and paganism, which included a notorious practice of ritualised cannibalism. Thus, from the perspective of foreign records, the Aru country was notoriously known as the origin of savage cannibals.
