= Sultanate of Serdang =

Sultanate in Sumatra

Coordinates: 3.5674287°N 98.956266°E

Sultanate of Serdang ﻛﺴﻠطﺎﻧﻦ سردڠ
- 1723–1946
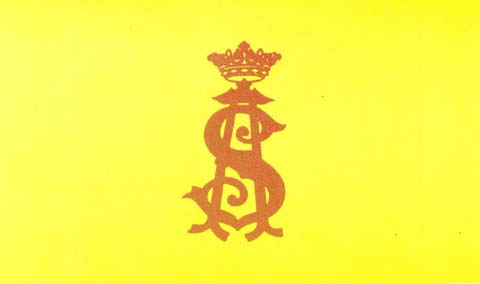
- Flag

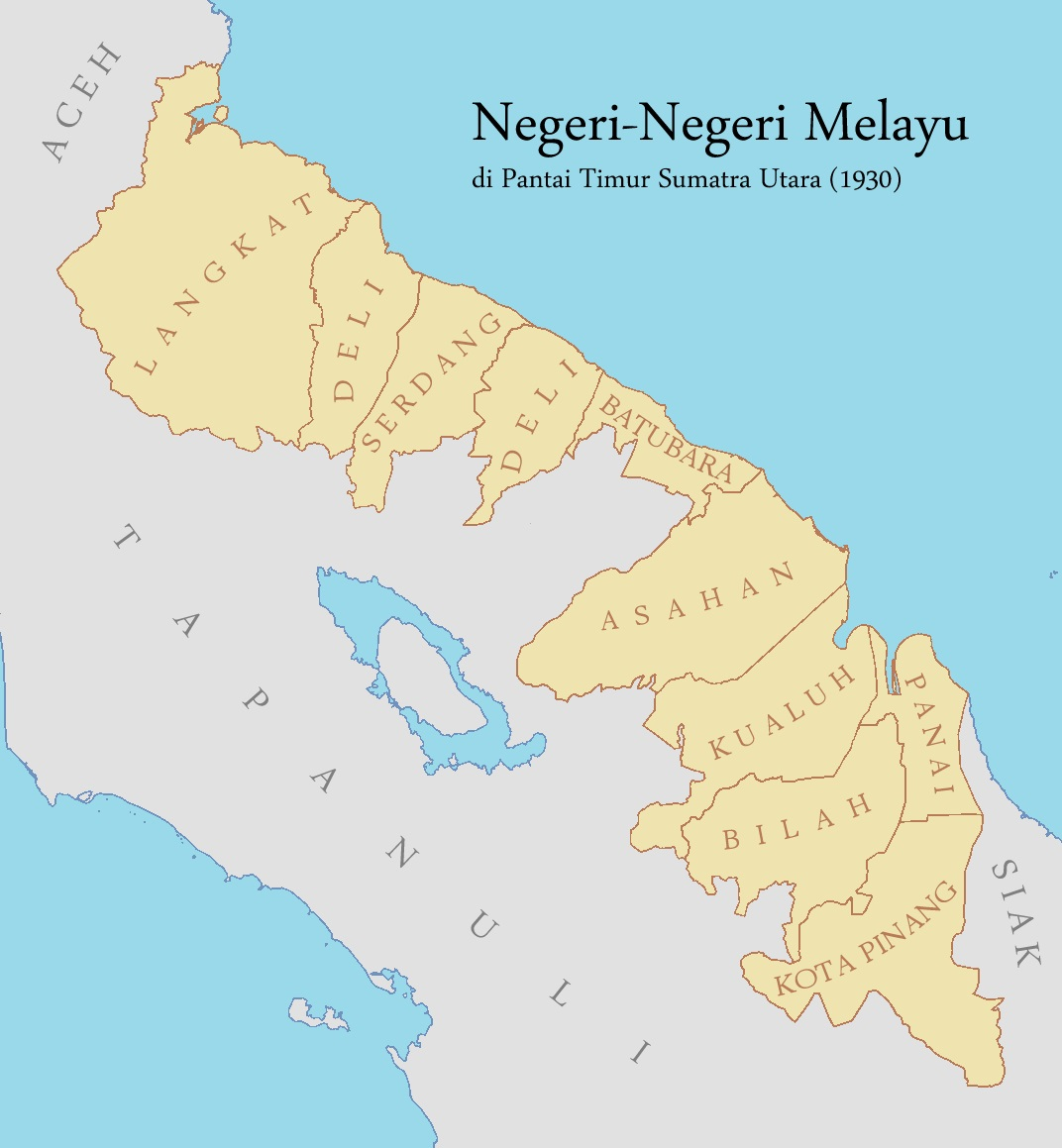
- The territory of the Sultanate of Serdang in 1930 (orange)
- Capital: Perbaungan
- Common languages: Malay
- Religion: Islam
- Government: Monarchy Sultanate
- Sultan
  - 1723-1782: Tuanku Umar Johan Pahlawan Alam Shah
  - 1879-1946: Sultan Sulaiman Syariful Alam Shah
  - 2011-Now: Sultan Achmad Thalaa Shariful Alam Shah
- History
  - Established: 1723
  - East Sumatra revolution: 1946
- Today part of: Indonesia

The Sultanate of Serdang (ﻛﺴﻠطﺎﻧﻦ سردڠ) was an early modern Malay monarchy in Serdang. It was founded in 1723 and joined the Republic of Indonesia in 1946. The Sultanate separated from the Sultanate of Deli after a dispute over the royal throne in 1720. Like other kingdoms on the east coast of Sumatra, Serdang prospered due to the opening of tobacco, rubber and oil palm plantations.

== History ==
=== Establishment of the Sultanate of Deli ===
According to history, an Laksamana from Sultan Iskandar Muda Aceh named Sri Paduka Gocah Pahlawan, have a title Laksamana Khoja Bintan, married to the younger brother of Raja Urung (state) Sunggal, a Karo Tribal area that already converted to Islam. Then, by the 4 Kings of the Urung Karo tribe who were already Muslim, this Laksamana was appointed king in Deli in 1630. With that event, the Kingdom of Deli was officially established, and the Laksamana became the first Deli King. In the coronation process of the Deli King, King Urung Sunggal was in charge as Ulun Jandi, namely to say obedience from the Big Men and people to the king. Then, the Datuk Empat Institution was formed, and Raja Urung Sunggal was a member of the Datuk Empat Institution.

=== Crisis ===
In its development, in 1723 there was chaos when Tuanku Panglima Paderap, the 3rd Raja Deli died. This crisis happened because the eldest son of the King who was supposed to replace him had a defect in his eyes, so he could not become king. Son number 2, Tuanku Pasutan who was very ambitious to become king then took over the throne and expelled his younger brother, Tuanku Umar with his mother, Permaisuri Tuanku Puan Sampali, to Serdang region.

According to Malay custom, Tuanku Umar was supposed to replace his father as the Deli King, because he was the son of garaha (permaisuri), while Tuanku Pasutan was only a concubine. However, because he was still a minor, Tuanku Umar was finally eliminated from the Deli. To prevent civil war from happening, the 2 Great Men of Deli, namely Raja Urung Sunggal and Raja Urung Senembal, together with an East Urung Batak King in the upstream Serdang region (Tanjong Merawa), and an official from Aceh (Lumu Kejeruan), then rationing Tuanku Umar as the first Serdang King in 1723. Since then, the Serdang Kingdom has been established as a fraction of the Deli Kingdom.

== Rulers ==
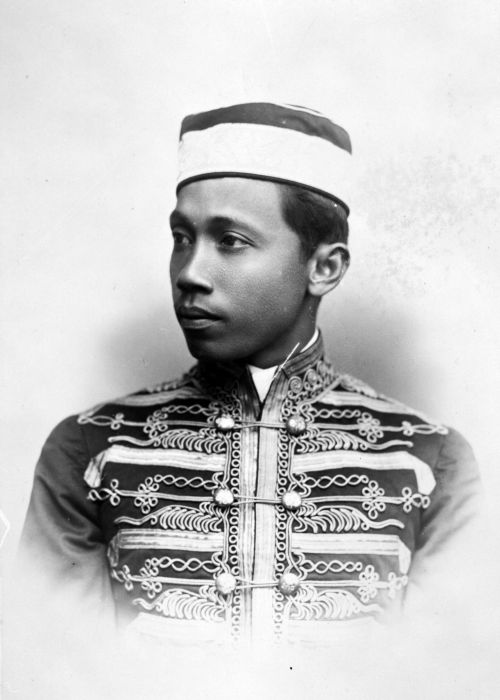
A sultan of Serdang

- 1728–1782 Tuanku Umar Johan Pahlawan Alam Shah bin Tuanku Panglima Paderap [Kejeruan Junjungan], Raja of Serdang
- 1782–1822 Tuanku Ainan Johan Pahlawan Alam Shah ibni al-Marhum Tuanku Umar [Al-Marhum Kacapuri], Raja of Serdang.
- 1822–1851 Paduka Sri Sultan Thaf Sinar Bashar Shah ibni al-Marhum Tuanku Ainan Johan Pahlawan Alam Shah [Al-Marhum Besar], Sultan and Yang di-Pertuan Besar of Serdang
- 1851–1879 Paduka Sri Sultan Muhammad Bashar ud-din Saif ul-'Alam Shah ibni al-Marhum Sultan Thaf Sinar Bashar *Shah [Al-Marhum Kota Batu], Sultan and Yang di-Pertuan Besar of Serdang
- 20 December 1879–13 October 1946 Paduka Sri Sultan Tuanku Sulaiman Sharif ul-'Alam Shah ibni al-Marhum Sultan Bashar un-din Al-Marhum Perbaungan, Sultan and Yang di-Pertuan Besar of Serdang

== Heads of the Royal House ==
- 1946–1960 Tuanku Rajih Anwar ibni al-Marhum Sultan Sulaiman Sharif ul-'Alam Shah, Tengku Putra Mahkota, Head of the Royal House of Serdang

=== Sultans ===
- 1960–2001 Paduka Sri Sultan Tuanku Abu Nawar Sharifu'llah Alam Shah al-Haj ibni al-Marhum Sultan Sulaiman Sharif ul-'Alam Shah, Sultan and Head of the Royal House of Serdang
- 2002–2011 Paduka Sri Sultan Tuanku Lukman Sinar Bashar Shah II ibni al-Marhum Sultan Sulaiman Sharif ul-'Alam Shah, Sultan and Head of the Royal House of Serdang.
- 2011–present Paduka Sri Sultan Tuanku Achmad Thalaa Shariful Alam Shah ibni al-Marhum Sultan Tuanku Abunawar Shariful Alam, Sultan and Head of the Royal House of Serdang.

== Family Tree ==
Family Tree of Serdang Monarchs

Umar Johan; Pahlawan; Alam Syah^{(1)} r. 1723-1782
Ainan Johan; Pahlawan; Alam Syah^{(2)} r. 1782-1822
Thaf Sinar; Basyar Syah I^{(3)} r. 1822-1851
Basyaruddin; Syaiful; Alam Syah^{(4)} r. 1851-1879
Sulaiman; Syariful; Alam Syah^{(5)} r. 1879-1946
Rajih Anwar^{(6)} r. 1946-1960	Abunawar; Syarifullah; Alam Syah; Al Haj^{(7)} r. 1960-2001	Luckman; Sinar Basyar; Syah II^{(8)} r. 2002-2011
Achmad Thalaa; Syariful; Alam Syah^{(9)} r. 2011-present

== See also ==
- History of Indonesia
- Sultanate of Deli
- Sultanate of Siak
- Malay people
- Indonesian Monarchies
