= L. B. Moerdani =

Indonesian military General (1932–2004)

General L. B. Moerdani
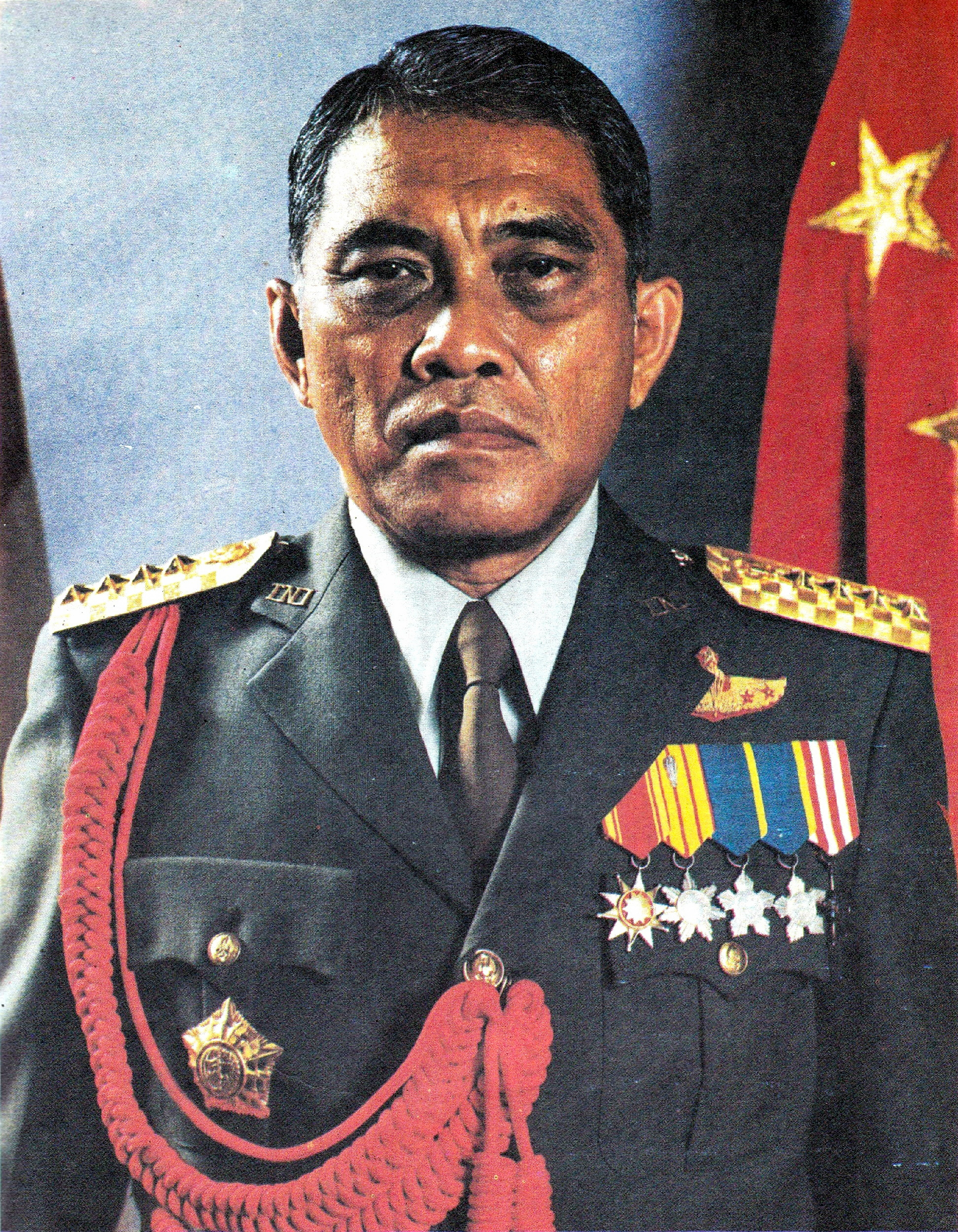
- Official portrait, 1985

17th Minister of Defense and Security
- In office 21 March 1988 – 17 March 1993
- President: Suharto
- Preceded by: Poniman
- Succeeded by: Edi Sudradjat

6th Commander of Kopkamtib
- In office 29 March 1983 – 5 September 1988
- President: Suharto
- Preceded by: Admiral Sudomo
- Succeeded by: Office abolished

8th Commander of the Armed Forces of the Republic of Indonesia
- In office 28 March 1983 – 27 February 1988
- President: Suharto
- Preceded by: General Mohammad Jusuf
- Succeeded by: General Try Sutrisno

Ambassador of Indonesia to South Korea
- Acting
- In office September 1973 – May 1974
- Preceded by: Position established
- Succeeded by: Sarwo Edhie Wibowo

Personal details
- Born: 2 October 1932 Cepu, Dutch East Indies
- Died: 29 August 2004 (aged 71) Jakarta, Indonesia
- Party: Independent
- Spouse: Hartini Moerdani (m. 1964)
- Occupation: Army officer; diplomat

Military service
- Allegiance: Indonesia
- Branch/service: Indonesian Army
- Years of service: 1952–1988
- Rank: General
- Unit: Kopassandha
- Commands: Kopkamtib; Indonesian Armed Forces
- Battles/wars: Indonesian National Revolution; Operation Kraai; Darul Islam rebellion; PRRI rebellion; Operation 17 August; Permesta rebellion; West New Guinea dispute; Operation Trikora; Operation Dwikora; Operation Lotus; Operation Woyla
- Service no.: 289461

General Leonardus Benjamin Moerdani (also publicly known as L. B. Moerdani or Benny Moerdani and in foreign media as Murdani; 2 October 1932 – 29 August 2004) was the Commander of the Indonesian National Armed Forces and Commander of the Kopkamtib from 1983 to 1988, and the Minister of Defense of the Republic of Indonesia from 1988 to 1993. During this time, he played an important role in Indonesian political and social life. He was noted as a Catholic leader in a predominantly Muslim country.

Moerdani spent nearly his entire career in military intelligence, and was sometimes described as a "spymaster."

== Early life ==
Moerdani was born on 2 October 1932 at Cepu, in the Blora Regency in Central Java, to R. G. Moerdani Sosrodirjo, a railway worker and his Indo Eurasian wife Jeanne Roech, who was half German. Moerdani was the 3rd out of 11 children. His father, who's a Muslim, tolerated his wife's and children's Catholic faith.

== Military career ==
=== Early military career ===
After the Indonesian Declaration of Independence on 17 August 1945, Moerdani was caught up in the wave of nationalism. In October 1945, aged 13, Moerdani took part in an assault on a Kempeitai headquarters in Solo after the Kempetai refused to surrender to Indonesian troops. When the People's Security Army (TKR), the precursor to the Indonesian Armed Forces was formed, Moerdani joined a Student Army (Tentara Pelajar) unit which came under the authority of an Indonesian Army Brigade. During the Second Dutch military offensive, Moerdani was part of the Abdoel Latif Company of Tentara Pelajar defending the city of Surakarta. On the afternoon of 21 December 1948, Moerdani was wounded when his unit was engaged by a Dutch Universal Carrier. One of the bullet fired from the armored vehicle shattered his rifle buttstock and he was hit by the shrapnel, rendering him unconscious. He was immediately brought to safety by other members of the Tentara Pelajar.

=== Post-independence ===
After Indonesian independence, Moerdani completed his education, graduating from middle school and going on to high school; in the meantime taking a part-time job helping his uncle sell goods. In 1951, the Indonesian Government began undertaking demobilization but Moerdani's brigade was deemed to have performed well enough for its soldiers to continue serving with ABRI. Moerdani, together with his brigade enlisted with the Army Officers Education Center (P3AD) and began training in January 1951. At the same time, Moerdani also took part in the Infantry Trainers School (SPI).

Moerdani completed his military education from P3AD in April 1952 and from SPI in May 1952. He was also given the rank of Chief Warrant Officer. 2 years later, in 1954, Moerdani received his commission as a Second Lieutenant and was stationed at TT III Siliwangi, which looked after the security of West Java.

=== KKAD/RPKAD ===
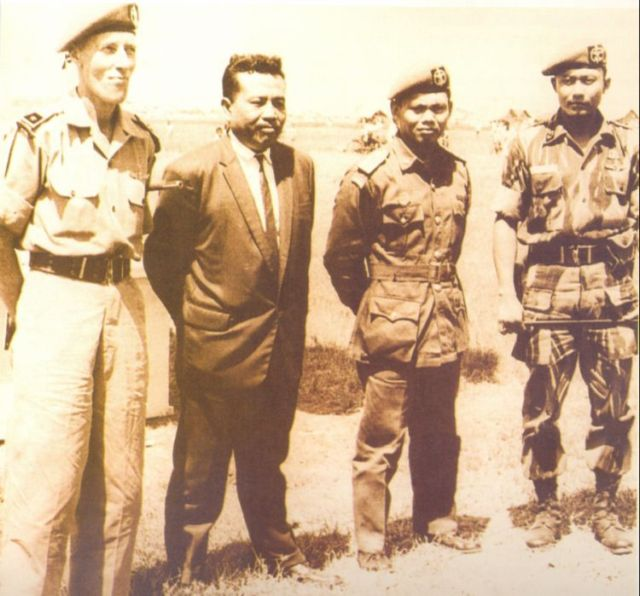
Major L.B. Moerdani (second to right) with Major Mochammad Idjon Djanbi (leftmost) and Lieutenant Colonel Sarwo Edhie (rightmost) while inspecting troops exercise.

In a bid to deal with the threat of Darul Islam, Colonel Alex Evert Kawilarang, the Commander of TT III Siliwangi formed the TT III Siliwangi Commando Unit (Kesko TT III). Their success interested the Army Headquarters in Jakarta to endorse the formation of a Special Forces Unit. As such, in 1954, the Army Commando Unit (Korps Komando Angkatan Darat or KKAD) was formed. Moerdani was assigned as a trainer for the soldiers wishing to join KKAD and was appointed Head of the Teaching Bureau. In 1955, KKAD went through a name change, and it was now known as the Army Paracommando Regiment (Resimen Para Komando Angkatan Darat or RPKAD). Not long after, Moerdani was appointed a Company Commander.

As a member of RPKAD, Moerdani became part of the battle to suppress the Revolutionary Government of the Republic of Indonesia (PRRI), a Sumatran-based rebel group. In March 1958, Moerdani parachuted down behind enemy lines in Pekanbaru and Medan to prepare the groundwork for ABRI to take over the two cities. A month later, on 17 April 1958, Moerdani took part in Operation 17 August, an operation which struck the killing blow on the PRRI rebellion. Moerdani's next assignment was against the Universal Struggle Charter (Permesta), another rebel group in Sulawesi. Similar to what he did in Sumatra, Moerdani and his troops laid down the foundations for an all out attack on Permesta who surrendered in June 1958.

After PRRI and Permesta's surrenders, Moerdani, was stationed in Aceh. In the beginning of 1960, he contemplated becoming an Army Aircraft Pilot but was dissuaded from it by Ahmad Yani who sent him to the United States to join the United States Army Infantry School at Fort Benning, Georgia. There, Moerdani took part in an Infantry Officers Advanced Course and trained with the 101st Airborne Division.

=== Papua ===
Moerdani returned to Indonesia in 1961 to find ABRI preparing itself for a takeover of West Irian. His first assignment was to train the paratroopers who were supposed to land behind enemy lines and infiltrate. As the months went on, the infiltration did not bring concrete results. In May 1962, Moerdani was assigned to lead a paratroop drop which consisted of RPKAD and Kostrad soldiers. After landing in West Irian in late June 1962, Moerdani led his troops in fighting skirmishes against members of the Dutch Marine until the United Nations intervened in August 1962 and decided to give West Irian to Indonesia. Once there was a ceasefire, Moerdani was placed in charge of all the guerilla troops in West Irian.

By 1964, Moerdani was back in Jakarta again. His achievements during the West Irian campaign had caught the eye of President Sukarno who wanted to recruit him as a presidential bodyguard and marry him to one of his daughters. Moerdani held his ground and rejected both offers.

=== Konfrontasi ===
In 1964, Moerdani and an RPKAD Battalion was sent to Borneo to fight a guerilla war against Malaysian and Commonwealth troops as part of the Indonesia-Malaysia confrontation. However, he did not spend a long time at Borneo, returning to Jakarta by September. At this stage, Moerdani had once again contemplated on expanding his career this time trying to decide between a career as a territorial commander in Borneo or as a military attaché. He picked the latter and had asked for a posting in Beijing.

=== Move to the Kostrad ===
At the end of 1964, a meeting of RPKAD officers was held and Moerdani was invited along. The topic of the meeting was to discuss removing crippled soldiers from RPKAD to which Moerdani objected. News of Moerdani's objection found its way to Yani, who was now the Army Commander. Yani summoned Moerdani and accused him of insubordination. The meeting ended with Yani ordering Moerdani to move from RPKAD to Kostrad. Moerdani handed over command of his RPKAD battalion on 6 January 1965.

Moerdani's move from RPKAD to Kostrad had been a sudden one and there had been no position prepared for him. His first post was as an officer attached to the Operations and Training Bureau. His luck changed when Lieutenant Colonel Ali Murtopo found out that he was part of Kostrad. Having been acquainted with Moerdani during the West Irian campaign, Ali recognized Moerdani's potential and wanted to further develop it. Coincidentally, Ali at the time was the Intelligence Assistant for the 1st Combat Command, a Kostrad unit stationed in Sumatra in preparation for the confrontation ordered by Sukarno in response to the creation of Malaysia in the fall of 1963. Ali recruited Moerdani to be Deputy Intelligence Assistant and gave him his first taste of intelligence work as the armed forces were fighting in the dense Borneo jungles against the Malaysian Armed Forces alongside servicemen from the Commonwealth of Nations.

=== Salesman for Garuda ===
In addition to becoming Deputy Intelligence Assistant, Moerdani also became part of Ali's Special Operations (Opsus) intelligence team. His task was to gather intelligence on Malaysia from Bangkok under the cover of being a Garuda Indonesia ticket seller. As 1965 wore on, his assignment also covered sending messages out by Army officers, tired and weary, who were not interested in the confrontation to the Malaysian government for the prospect of gaining a peaceful settlement.

=== 30 September Movement ===
After the 30 September Movement was crushed on 1 October 1965 by Kostrad Commander Major General Suharto, Moerdani's activities intensified. He was joined by Ali and together they began working at laying the foundations for an end of the Confrontation. Their efforts culminated on 11 August 1966 when the Indonesian and Malaysian governments signed an agreement to normalise relations between the two nations.

=== Diplomatic career ===
Although peace had been reached, Moerdani stayed in Malaysia as chargé d'affaires. His first task was to ensure the release of Indonesian soldiers and guerilla fighters which had been caught during Confrontation. In March 1968, with an ambassador finally assigned to Malaysia, Moerdani became the head of the Indonesian Consulate in Western Malaysia. At the same time, he continued being part of Opsus with the assignment of conducting surveillance on the goings on in the Vietnam War.

At the end of 1969 Moerdani was transferred to Seoul to become the Indonesian consul general at South Korea. He was promoted from colonel to brigadier-general in February 1970 just before he took up his post in Seoul. In 1973, Moerdani's status was upgraded from consul general to chargé d'affaires.

=== Intelligence officer ===
Moerdani's diplomatic career came to an abrupt end with the Malari Incident in Jakarta in January 1974 and within a week of the incident, Moerdani had returned to Jakarta. President Suharto immediately gave him a collection of positions which gave him a lot of power. Moerdani became the Intelligence Assistant to the Minister of Defense and Security, Intelligence Assistant to the Commander of the Operational Command for the Restoration of Security and Order (Kopkamtib), Head of the Strategic Intelligence Centre (Pusintelstrat), and Deputy Head of the National Intelligence Coordinating Agency (Bakin).

=== East Timor (Operation Seroja) ===
In 1975, Moerdani became deeply involved with the matter of East Timor's decolonization. In August 1975, Moerdani began sending Indonesian soldiers under the guise of volunteers to begin infiltrating East Timor. The situation intensified on 28 November 1975 when Fretilin declared East Timor's independence. The intelligence operation ceased and a military operation, Operation Seroja (Operation Lotus) was set up in its stead. Despite it not being an intelligence operation, Moerdani continued to be involved, this time as the planner of the invasion. His method in planning the invasion drew the ire of colleagues because it kept some high command officers, such as Deputy ABRI Commander Surono and Kostrad Commander Leo Lopulisa in the dark when they should have been involved in the planning process.

=== Garuda GA206 hijack ===
On 28 March 1981, Garuda Indonesia Flight 206, which was supposed to be flying from Jakarta to Medan was hijacked. The news arrived to Moerdani at Ambon where he was attending an ABRI Leadership meeting with ABRI Commander M Jusuf. Moerdani immediately left the meeting to go to Jakarta to prepare to take action, in the meantime the hijacked aircraft had landed at Bangkok's Don Muang Airport. Moerdani met with Suharto and secured the President's permission to use force in a bid to release the hostages; the rationale being that the hijackers should not be allowed to intimidate the aircraft pilots into flying to other countries.

Accompanied by troops from the Battle Intelligence Troop Commando (Kopassandha), formerly RPKAD, Moerdani left for Thailand. Although his plan encountered some resistance, particularly from the Thai Government, there was finally an agreement to take the military action. On the morning of 31 March 1981, Moerdani personally led the Kopassandha troops to storm the aircraft, take back control of it, and save the hostages.

== Commander of ABRI ==
=== Appointment ===
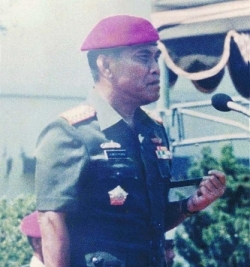
General L.B. Moerdani following his appointment as Commanding General of the Indonesian Armed Forces in March 1983.

In March 1983, Moerdani reached the pinnacle of his military career when Suharto named him as the Commander-in-Chief of ABRI and promoted him to the rank of full General. During the inauguration ceremony, Suharto gave recognition to Moerdani's loyalty by personally placing Moerdani's epaulettes on his shoulder.

Moerdani reached this position with the distinction of having never commanded a unit bigger than a battalion and having not served as a Regional Military Commander (Kodam) and Army Chief of Staff. In addition to the Commandership of ABRI, Moerdani was also appointed Commander of Kopkamtib, and retained his position in Pusintelstrat, which was renamed the Strategic Intelligence Agency (BAIS-ABRI). Unlike previous New Order ABRI Commanders, Moerdani was not appointed Minister of Defense and Security in a concurrent capacity.

=== Reorganization of ABRI ===
Moerdani immediately took steps to reorganize the Armed Forces, listing cutting costs, improving efficiency, and improving professionalism as his immediate goals. During his term, in 1985 the Armed Forces was officially severed from the operational control of the Ministry of Defense to become a separate institution, reporting directly to the office of the President (in his/her capacity as Commander in Chief) while being assisted by the Minister of Defense in matters relating to its constitutional mandates.

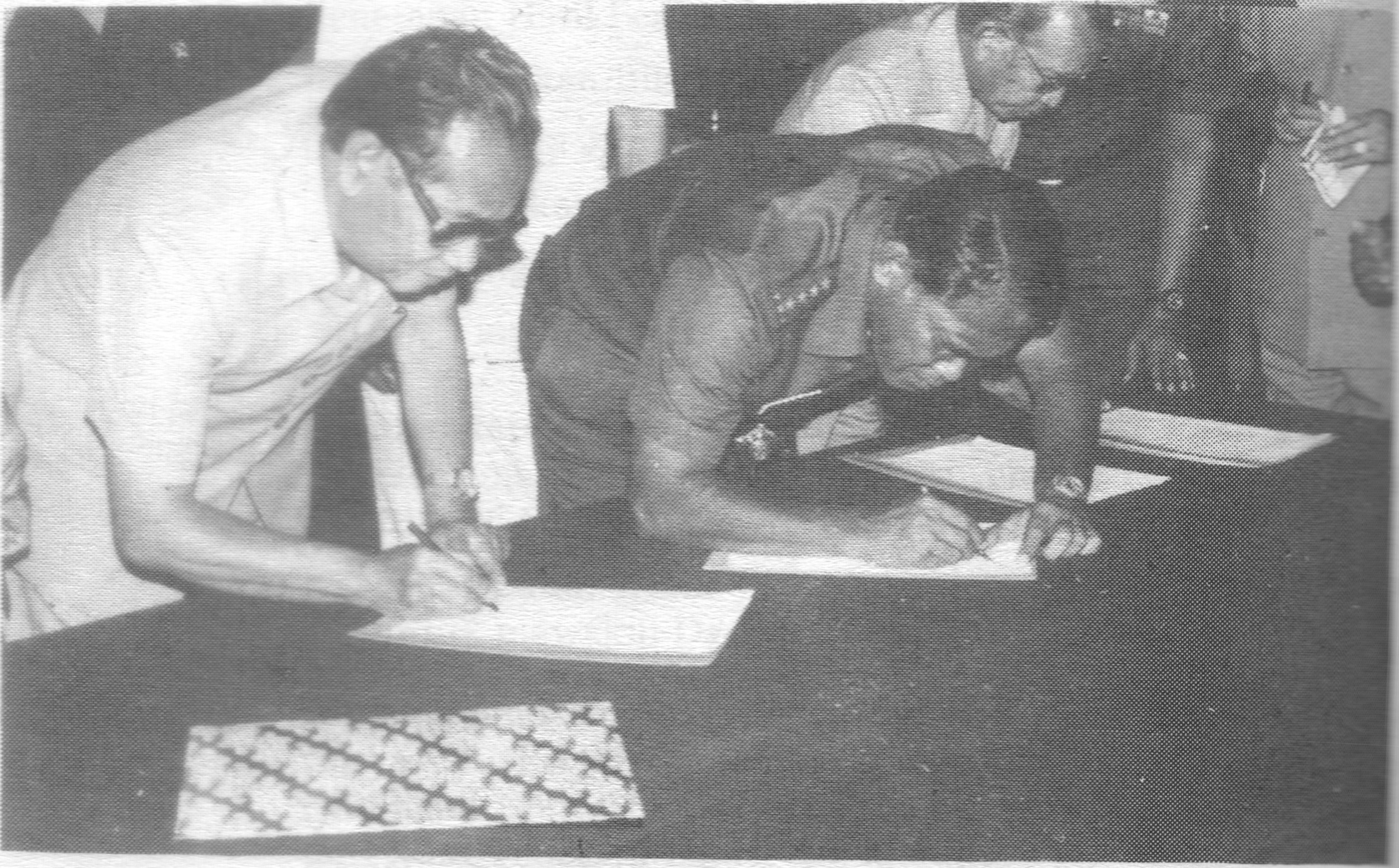
Moerdani ratified the results of the 1987 general elections. Note his general rank.

With regards to command structure, Moerdani first eliminated the Regional Defense Commands (Kowilhans), a command structure that had been created in 1969, as well as the joint service National Strategic Command ("Kostranas"). He then revamped the regional commands system for the Army, Navy, and Air Force. The Army's Military Regional Commands (Kodam) were reduced from 16 to 10, the Navy's 8 Regional Naval Commands (Kodaeral) were streamlined into 2 Fleet Headquarters, and the Air Force's 8 Regional Air Force Commands (Kodau) were similarly streamlined into 2 Air Operational Commands, with all commanding officers demoted to being liaison officers for the military regions, which became the primary area organisation for strategic, tactical, and territorial operations for all service branches. The National Police was also reorganized with red tape being cut to allow Police forces at the lowest levels to take immediate action and response against criminal activities.

Moerdani also worked towards decreasing the non-military portion of the Armed Forces Academies' (Akabri) curriculum. To improve the quality of the academy's input as well as to strengthen the nationalist base, Moerdani conceptualized a senior high (pre-Academy) school to train the nation's brightest talents to later become members of the national elite group (the school, Taruna Nusantara, is now running and located side by side with the Military Academy in Magelang). Moerdani also improved cooperation between the Armed Forces of ASEAN countries.

=== Tanjung Priok Incident ===
Moerdani's Catholic background came to the forefront in 1984 when together with KODAM V/Jaya Commander, Try Sutrisno, he ordered a crackdown on Islamist protesters at Tanjung Priok, Jakarta, which resulted in deaths. Moerdani claimed the protesters had been provoked and could not be controlled peacefully, so he ordered the crackdown. Moerdani insisted he never wanted to persecute Muslims and conducted visits to Muslim schools around Java to improve his image with Muslims.

As ABRI Commander-in-Chief, Moerdani was arguably the de facto second most powerful man in social and political aspects of the Republic, after Suharto.

== Political career ==
=== 1988 People's Consultative Assembly (MPR) General Session ===
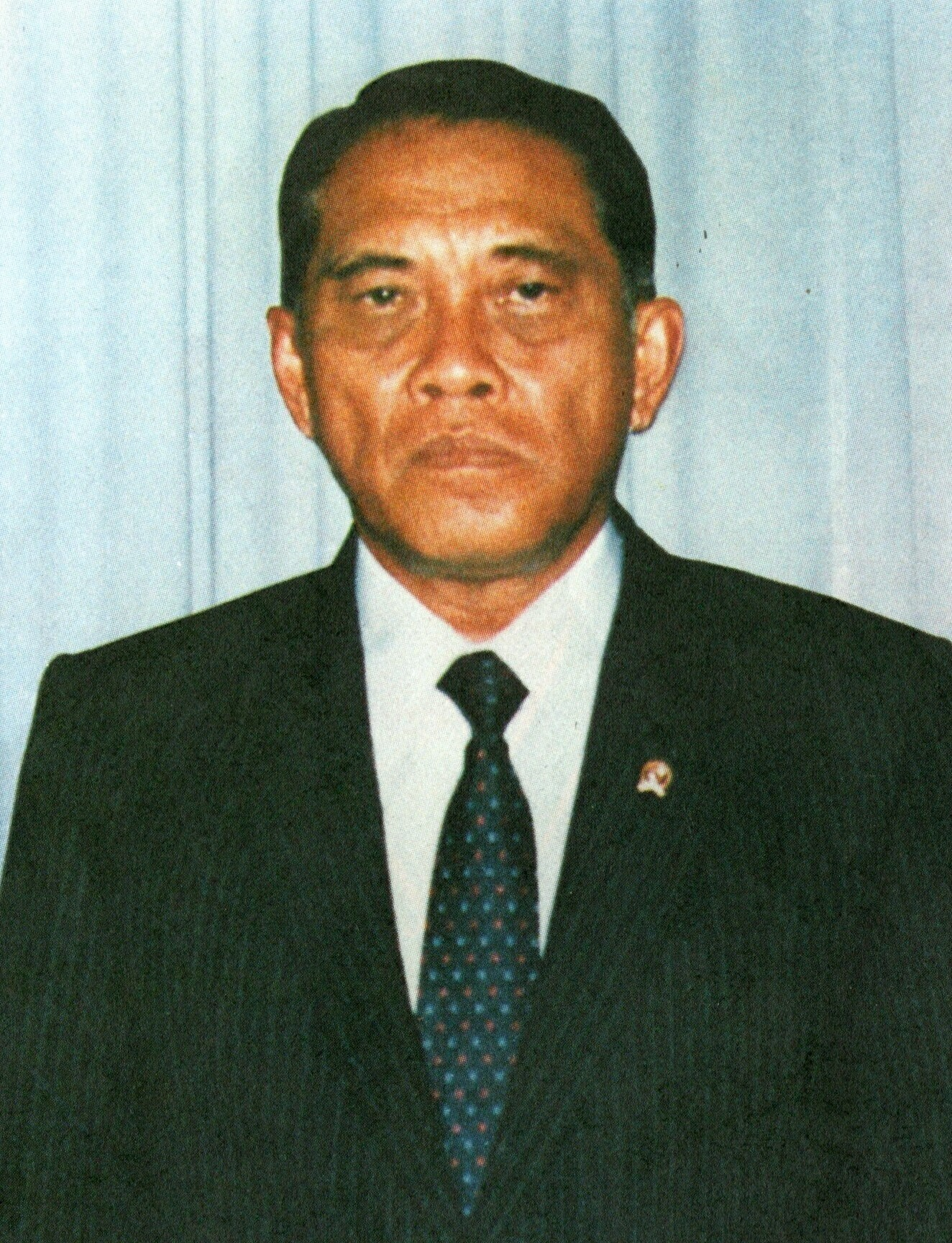
Moerdani in 1988 during his tenure as Minister of Defense and Security.

By 1988, Moerdani's relationship with Suharto had soured. Although he was loyal to Suharto, Moerdani was assertive enough to criticize the President for the corruption and nepotism in the regime. By this time, Moerdani had also made an enemy out of Prabowo Subianto, Suharto's son in law.

1988 was an important year as it was the year of an MPR General Session, the venue in which the President and the Vice President is elected. As the General Session approached, Suharto began making signs that he wanted Sudharmono as his Vice President. According to Kivlan Zen, a close associate of Prabowo, this ran contrary to Moerdani, who wanted to become vice president himself. As such, this seemed to have been the reason for Moerdani's discharge from the position of ABRI Commander in February 1988, although according to Robert Elson, this was done more because Suharto did not want Moerdani to be in control of the Armed Forces when Sudharmono was nominated. Robert Elson theorized of the possibility of Sudharmono's vice presidency being the final step before the Indonesian Presidency itself.

Moerdani did not seem to give up. The same month the top brass of Golkar met to discuss the MPR General Session. On the matter of the vice presidential candidate the Bureaucrats and Functional factions unanimously agreed to nominate Sudharmono. The ABRI faction's nomination was delayed, with Moerdani continuing to procrastinate by claiming that he had not discussed the vice presidential nomination with Suharto yet. When pressured, Moerdani expressed his concern about Sudharmono's nomination although he did not give a specific reason. At one stage, he began giving subliminal signals that Try should be nominated as vice president. Try did not pick up on this and along with the other officers convinced a reluctant Moerdani that the ABRI Faction's vice presidential candidate would be Sudharmono.

Many believed that Moerdani was responsible for the controversy that continued to dog Sudharmono's nomination. It was believed that Brigadier General Ibrahim Saleh's attack on Sudharmono and the nomination of the United Development Party (PPP) Chairman Jailani Naro as vice president was Moerdani's work. Nevertheless, Suharto's will came through in the end and Sudharmono was elected vice president.

=== Minister of Defense and Security ===
Despite his attempts to block Sudharmono, Suharto did not demote Moerdani and appointed him as the Minister of Defense and Security. However, Moerdani would lose most of his powers in September 1988 with the disbandment of Kopkamtib.

During his term as Minister, Moerdani was accused of planning a coup against Suharto. This prompted Suharto to promise a harsh crackdown on anyone who dared to replace him unconstitutionally.

=== 1993 MPR General Session ===
Before the 1993 MPR General Session, Moerdani was seen as the engineer of ABRI's pre-emptive nomination of Try as vice president. Suharto was displeased with the nomination and only accepted Try reluctantly. Suharto's consolation was that he did not name Moerdani to the next Cabinet.

== Death ==
Moerdani died on 29 August 2004 at Gatot Soebroto Army Hospital in Jakarta after suffering a stroke and lung infection.

== Honours ==
=== National ===
- Star of Mahaputera (2nd Class) (Indonesian: Bintang Mahaputera Adipradana)
- Star of Mahaputera (3rd Class) (Indonesian: Bintang Mahaputera Utama)
- Star of Meritorious Service (Indonesian: Bintang Dharma)
- Grand Meritorious Military Order Star, 1 Class (Indonesian: Bintang Yudha Dharma Utama)
- Army Meritorious Service Star, 1 Class (Indonesian: Bintang Kartika Eka Paksi Utama)
- Navy Meritorious Service Star, 1 Class (Indonesian: Bintang Jalasena Utama)
- Air Force Meritorious Service Star, 1 Class (Indonesian: Bintang Swa Bhuana Paksa Utama)
- Star of Bhayangkara, 1st Class (Indonesian: Bintang Bhayangkara Utama)

=== Foreign honours ===
- Brunei:
  - Honorary Grand Commander of the Order of Paduka Keberanian Laila Terbilang (DPKT) - Dato Paduka Seri (1985)
- Egypt:
  - Order of the Republic, 2nd Class
- Jordan:
  - Grand Cordon of the Order of Independence
- Malaysia:
  - Honorary Commander of the Order of the Defender of the Realm (PMN) – Tan Sri (1983)
  - Courageous Commander of the Most Gallant Order of Military Service (PGAT) (1986)
    - Johor:
      - Honorary Grand Commander of the Order of the Crown of Johor (SPMJ) - Dato' (1986)
    - Sarawak:
      - Honorary Grand Principal of the Order of the Star of Hornbill Sarawak (DP) – Datuk Patinggi (1986)
- Philippines
  - Commander of the Philippine Legion of Honor (1988)
  - Distinguished Service Star
- Singapore:
  - Recipient of the Darjah Utama Bakti Cemerlang (Tentera) (DUBC) (1987)
- South Korea:
  - Heung-In of the Order of Diplomatic Service Merit
  - Order of National Security Merit - 2nd Class (Gukseon Medal)
- Thailand:
  - Knight Grand Cross of the Most Exalted Order of the White Elephant (1984)
- Yugoslavia:
  - Order of the Yugoslav Star with Golden Wreath (1975)

=== Namesakes ===
On 3 October 2021, the General LB Moerdani Modular Hospital (Indonesian: Rumah Sakit Modular Jenderal TNI L.B. Moerdani) in Merauke Regency, Papua was inaugurated by President Joko Widodo.

Political offices
Preceded by Poniman	Minister of Defense and Security; 1988–1993	Succeeded by Edi Sudradjat
Military offices
Preceded by Mohammad Jusuf	Commander of the Indonesian Armed Forces; 1983–1988	Succeeded by Try Sutrisno
Preceded by Sudomo	Commander of Kopkamtib; 1983–1988	Disbanded
Diplomatic posts
New office	Ambassador of Indonesia to South Korea (acting); 1973–1974	Succeeded by Sarwo Edhie Wibowo
