= Sintong Panjaitan =

Indonesian army officer (born 1940)

Lieutenant general Sintong Panjaitan
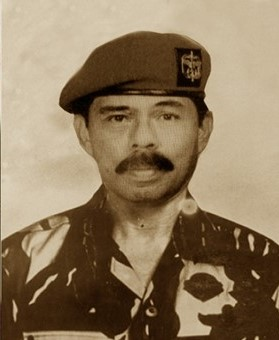
- Sintong Panjaitan, 1985

13th Regional Military Commander of Kodam IX/Udayana
- In office 12 August 1988 – 1 January 1992
- Preceded by: Djoko Pramono
- Succeeded by: HBL Mantiri

10th Commander of Kopassus
- In office May 1985 – August 1987
- Preceded by: Wismoyo Arismunandar
- Succeeded by: Kuntara

Personal details
- Born: 4 September 1940 (age 86) Taroetoeng, Tapanoeli Residency, Dutch East Indies
- Spouse: Lentina Napitupulu
- Children: 2
- Education: Indonesian Military Academy (1963)

Military service
- Allegiance: Indonesia
- Branch/service: Indonesian Army
- Years of service: 1963–1991
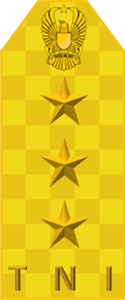
- Rank: Lieutenant General
- Unit: infantry (Kopassus)
- Battles/wars: Darul Islam rebellion; Operation Dwikora; Papua conflict; 30 September Movement; Operation Lotus; Insurgency in East Timor

Sintong Hamonangan Panjaitan (born 4 September 1940) is a retired Indonesian army officer who graduated from the National Military Academy in 1963. Military Advisor to President BJ Habibie, Secretary for Development Operational Control of Kodam IX/Udayana, and Chief of Staff of the Indonesian Army. He received 20 operation orders at home and abroad during his military career. He was removed from his position as regional military commander due to the Dili incident at the Santa Cruz cemetery in 1991, which causing the decline of his career in the military before retiring with the rank of lieutenant general.

== Early life ==
Sintong was born in Tarutung, North Sumatra, the seventh of 11 siblings. His father, Simon Luther Panjaitan (formerly Mangiang Panjaitan) was a Mantri at Centrale Burgelijke Ziekenhuis (RSU) Semarang. His mother, Elina Siahaan was the daughter of a king in Aek Nauli, King Ompu Joseph Siahaan. The two were married in Semarang, in 1925. Sintong's interest in the military emerged when he was seven years old when his house was often hit by P-51 Mustang bombs from the Royal Netherlands Air Force. Sintong began to carry arms in high school (1958) when he participated in a 3-month military training course carried out by the PRRI movement under the leadership of Colonel Maludin Simbolon.

== Military career ==
Sintong applied for the Air Force Academy in 1959. While waiting for the results of his application, Sintong also took the National Military Academy entrance exam in 1960 and graduated as part of the 117 cadets of batch V. Sintong graduated from the Military Academy in 1963 with the rank of Second Lieutenant. Then he attended the Infantry Military Academy in Bandung and graduated on 27 June 1964 and was placed as the first officer of the Army Command Troops Regiment (RPKAD), the elite forces of the Army (now the Special Forces Command - Kopassus).

From August 1964 to February 1965 Sintong commanded his first combat operations during Operation Kila, to crush the DI/TII rebellion led by Abdul Kahar Muzakar in South and Southeast Sulawesi. In February 1965, Sintong attended commando basic education at the Army Command Education Center at Batujajar. He obtained the Command attribute at Permisan Beach, on August 1, 1965, and returned to Batujajar for Para basic education, experiencing 3 falls. After that, he received orders to be deployed in Kuching, Sarawak, East Malaysia as part of a Volunteer Company during the Indonesia–Malaysia confrontation.

The 30 September Movement (G30S) canceled the planned deployment. Sintong as part of a Company under the leadership of First Lieutenant Feisal Tanjung then played an active role in ending the G30S. Sintong led a platoon of troops to seize the headquarters of Radio Republik Indonesia (RRI), which allowed Brigadier General Ibnu Subroto to broadcast the message of Major General Suharto. Sintong also took part in securing Halim Perdanakusuma Airfield and led his men in the discovery of an old well at Lubang Buaya. After that Sintong was sent to restore security and order in Central Java, to lead a Platoon under Tanjung company to combat G30S supporters in Semarang, Demak, Blora, Kudus, Cepu, Salatiga, Boyolali, Yogyakarta and the eastern slopes of Mount Merapi.

In 1969 Captain Feisal Tanjung included Sintong to persuade tribal chiefs in West Irian to choose to join Indonesia in the Act of Free Choice. Sintong became Commander of Kopassandha from 1985 to 1987, replacing Brigadier General. Wismoyo Arismunandar.

Sintong Panjaitan was the leader of the Para Command Group-1, involved in counter-terrorism operations in the hijacking of the Garuda DC-9 Woyla on March 31, 1981. Although there were two fatalities (one pilot and one member of the Commandos), the operation was considered a success by the Indonesian government due to the safety of all the crew and other passengers on the plane, he and his team were awarded the Sakti Star and promoted one rank.

His involvement in military operations in East Timor was a reason for his appointment as Commander of IX/Udayana Military Regional Command which covered the province of East Timor. Sintong was later removed from his post as commander due to the Dili Incident at the Santa Cruz cemetery, on 11 November 1991, which resulted in civilian casualties and an international scandal, ending Sintong's military career. As a result of his involvement in the incident, he was sued in 1992 by the family of one of the victims and sentenced, in 1994, to pay a total of 14 million US dollars in damages.

== Post military career ==
Minister of Research and Technology Prof. Dr. Bacharuddin Jusuf Habibie appointed Sintong as an adviser in the military field at the Agency for the Assessment and Application of Technology (BPPT) in 1994. Sintong became a trusted adviser to Habibie until Habibie became President of Indonesia in 1998 where Sintong sat as an adviser to the President in the military field. Habibie had in-depth discussions with Sintong, General Wiranto (Commander of ABRI and Minister of Defense), and Yunus Yosfiah (Minister of Information) before allowing the East Timor referendum to determine whether East Timor would remain in the Republic of Indonesia or become a separate country.
