= Trishula =

Symbol in Hinduism

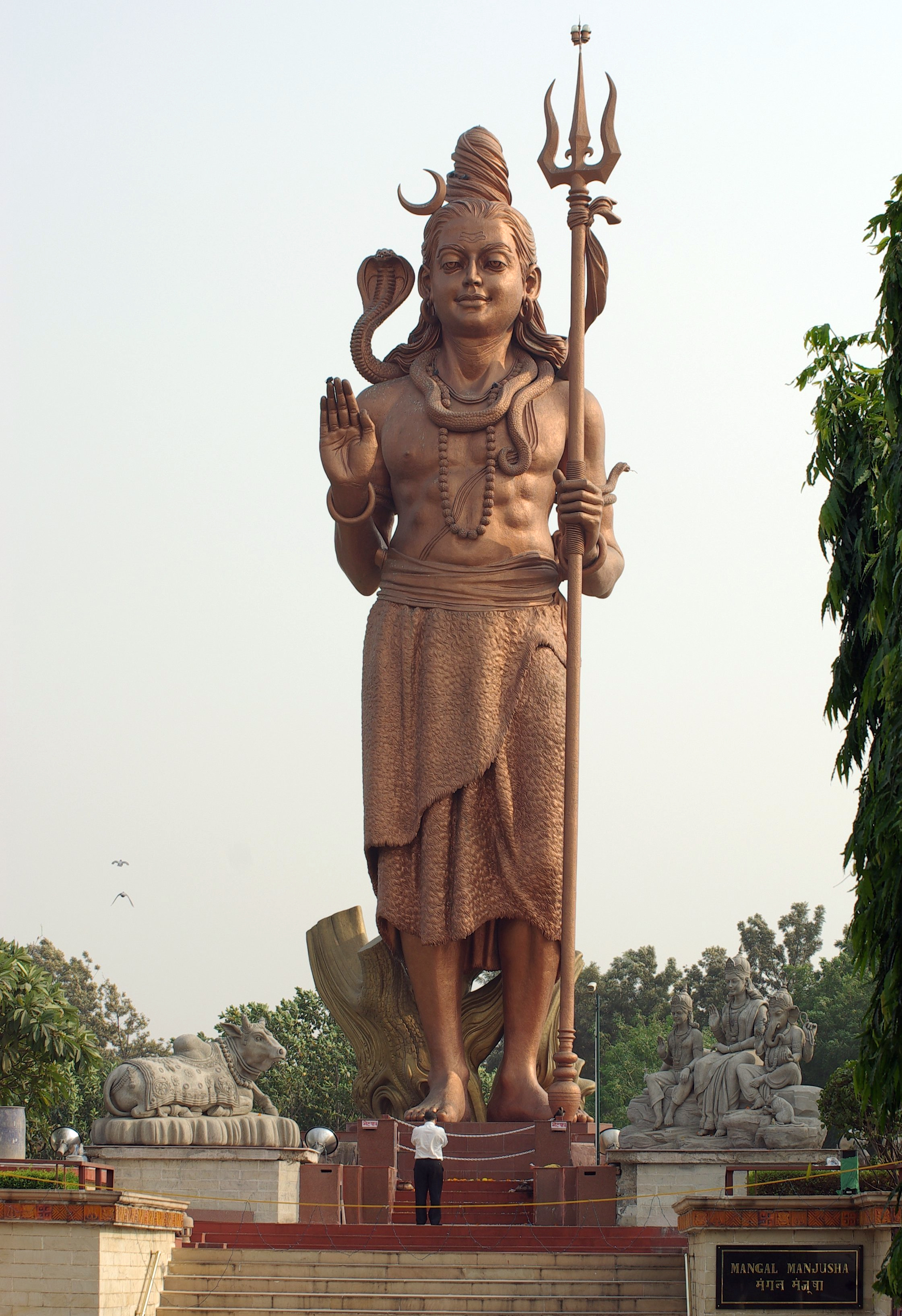
Statue of Shiva holding a trishula.

The trishula (Sanskrit: त्रिशूल, romanized: triśūla) is a trident, a divine symbol, commonly used as one of the principal symbols in Hinduism. It is most commonly associated with the deity Shiva and widely employed in his iconography.

== Etymology ==
The name trishula ultimately derives from the Sanskrit word त्रिशूल (triśūla), from त्रि (trí), meaning "three", and शूल (śū́la), meaning "a sharp iron pin or stake", referring in this case to the weapon's three prongs.

== Symbolism ==
The trishula has a number of interpretations in Hindu belief. The three points of the weapon have various meanings and significance have many stories behind them. They are commonly said to represent various trinities: creation, preservation, and destruction; past, present, and future; body, mind and atman; Dharma (law and order), bliss/mutual enjoyment and emanation/created bodies; compassion, joy and love; spiritual, psychic and relative; happiness, comfort and boredom; pride, repute and egotism; clarity, knowledge and wisdom; heaven, mind and earth; soul, fire and earth; soul, passion and embodied-soul; logic, passion and faith; prayer, manifestation and sublime; insight, serenity and bodhisattvahood or arhatship (anti-conceit); practice, understanding and wisdom; death, ascension and resurrection; creation, order and destruction; the three gunas: sattva, rajas, and tamas.

== Literature ==
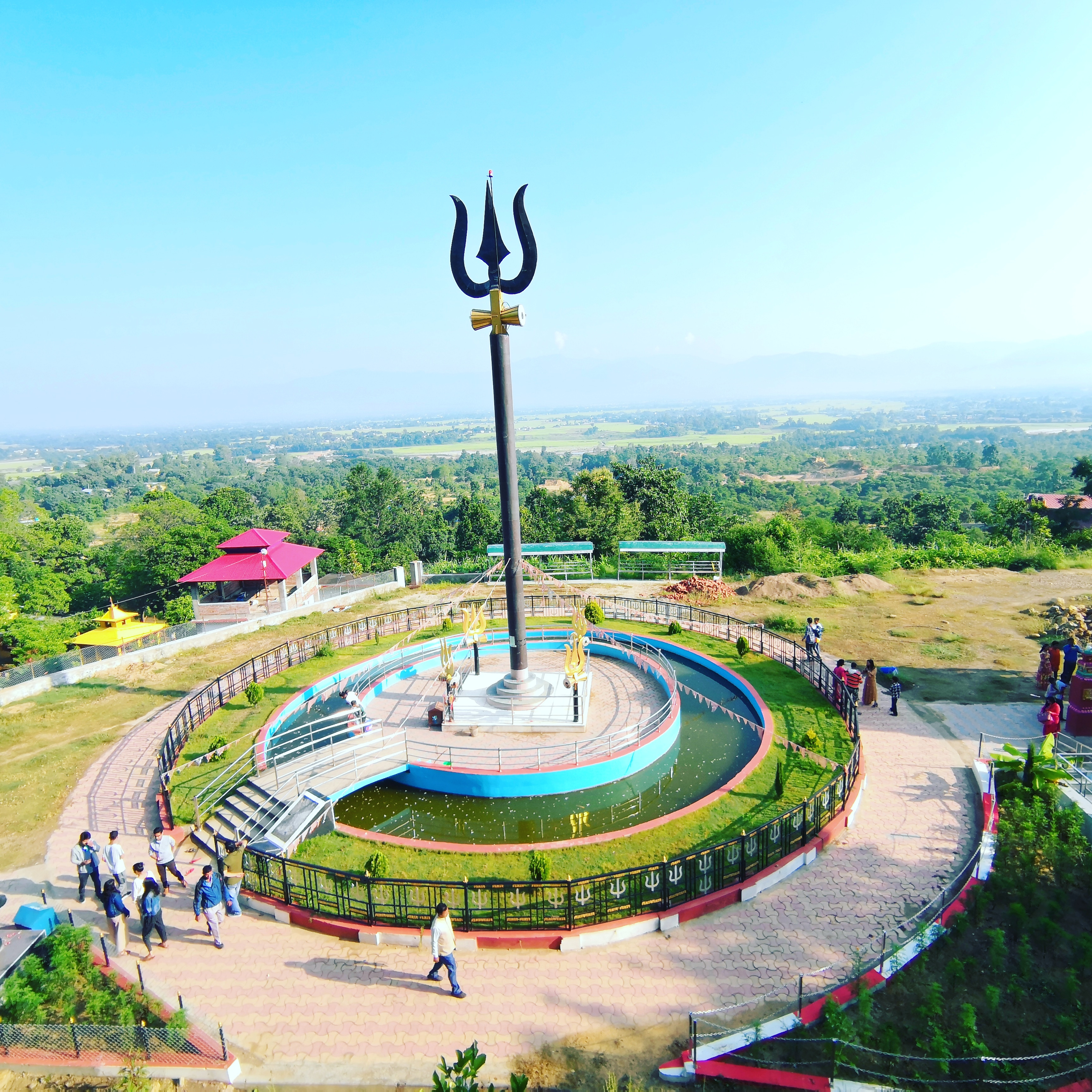
World's largest Trishula at Pandaveshwar Temple in Dang, Nepal

According to the Shiva Purana, Shiva is svayambhu, self-created, born of his volitions. He is described to bear a trishula from the very beginning of creation.

According to the Skanda Purana, Shiva employed the trishula to behead Ganesha, who refused to allow him passage in order to visit the bathing Parvati.

According to the Vishnu Purana, the sun god Surya married Sanjna, the daughter of the divine architect Vishvakarma. Unable to bear his brilliance, Sanjna brought this issue to her father, who arranged for his energy to be reduced to one-eighth of its previous intensity. The blazing energy descended towards the ground, used by Vishvakarma to create the Trishula for Shiva, the Sudarshana Chakra for Vishnu, a palanquin for Kubera, the lance for Kartikeya, and all the other weapons of the gods.

According to the Devi Bhagavata Purana, the goddess Durga holds a trishula among other weapons and attributes in her hands and amongst her accouterment, having received celestial weapons from both Shiva and Vishnu.

== Other uses ==
In Nepal and Thailand, the term also often refers to a short-handled weapon which may be mounted on a daṇḍa "staff". Unlike the Okinawan sai, the trishula is often bladed. In Indonesian, trisula usually refers specifically to a long-handled trident, while the diminutive version is more commonly known as a cabang or tekpi.

A similar word, ”trushul”, is the Romani word for 'cross' specifically referring to the cross Jesus was crucified on.

Trisula is also the name of a military operation by the ABRI to crack down on PKI remnants in southern Blitar.

== Gallery ==
Shiva's trishula with damaru.

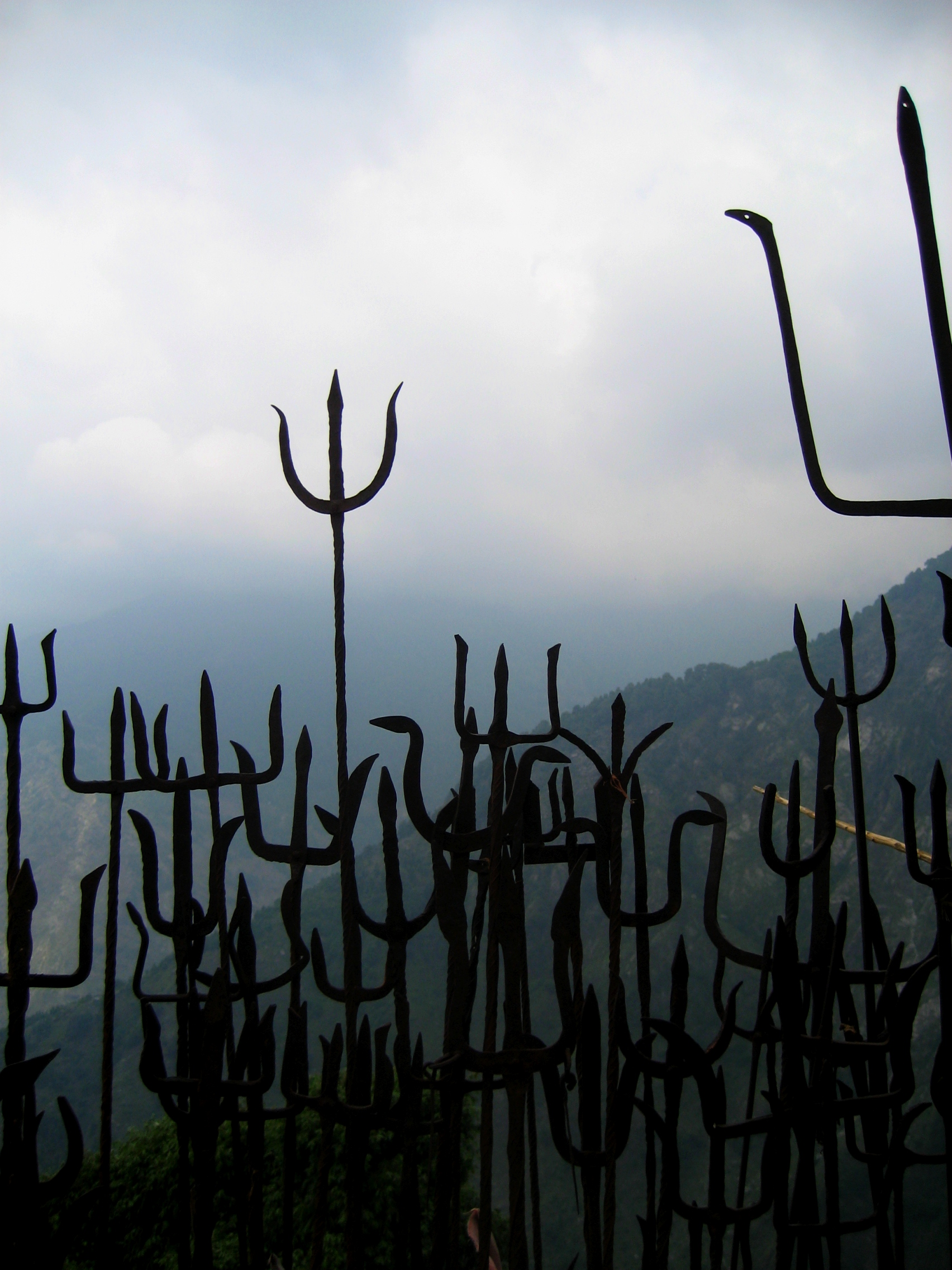
Trishula brought as offerings to Guna Devi, near Dharamsala, Himachal Pradesh.

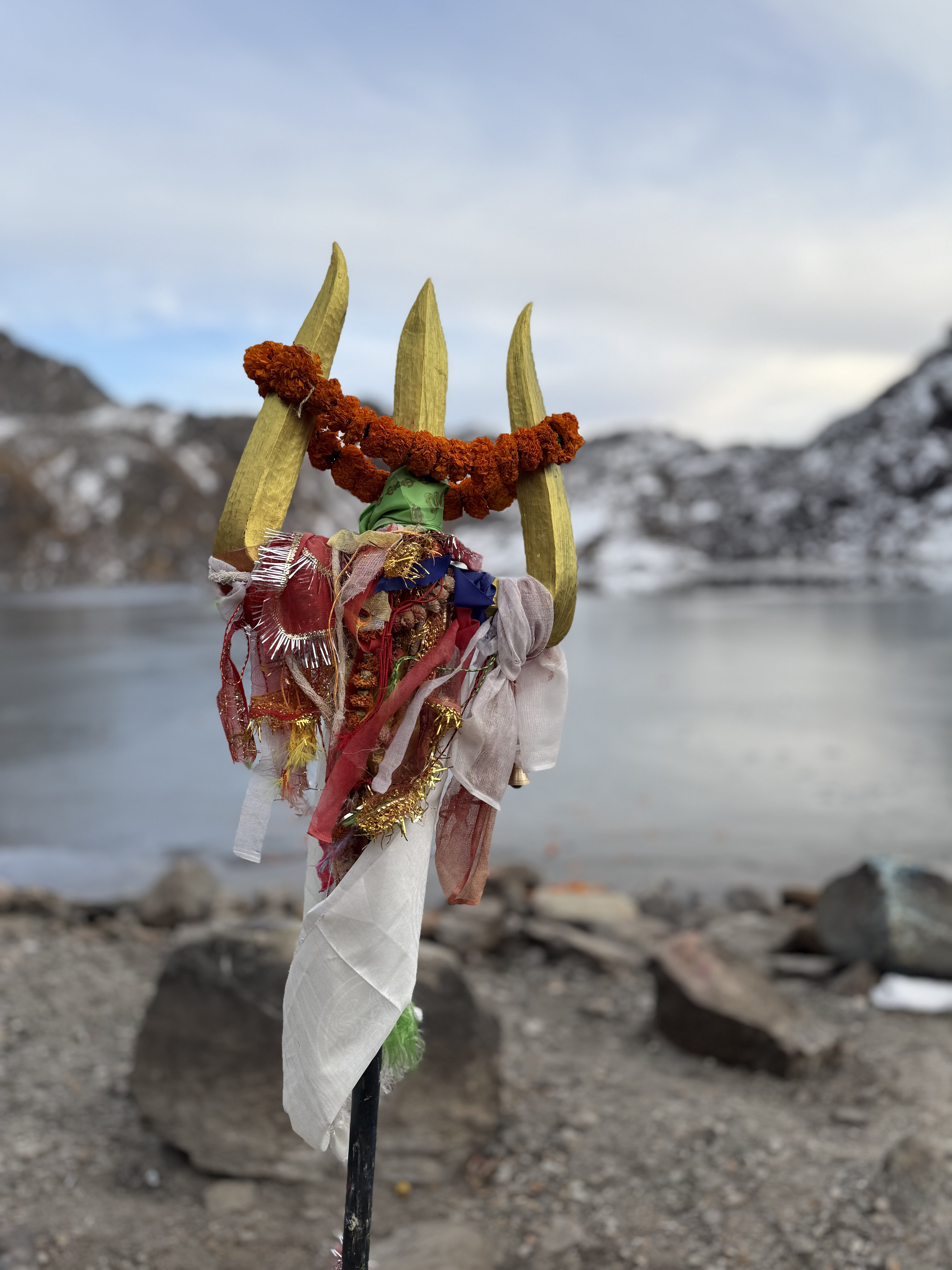
Trishula on the northwest shore of Gosaikunda on Shivaratri.

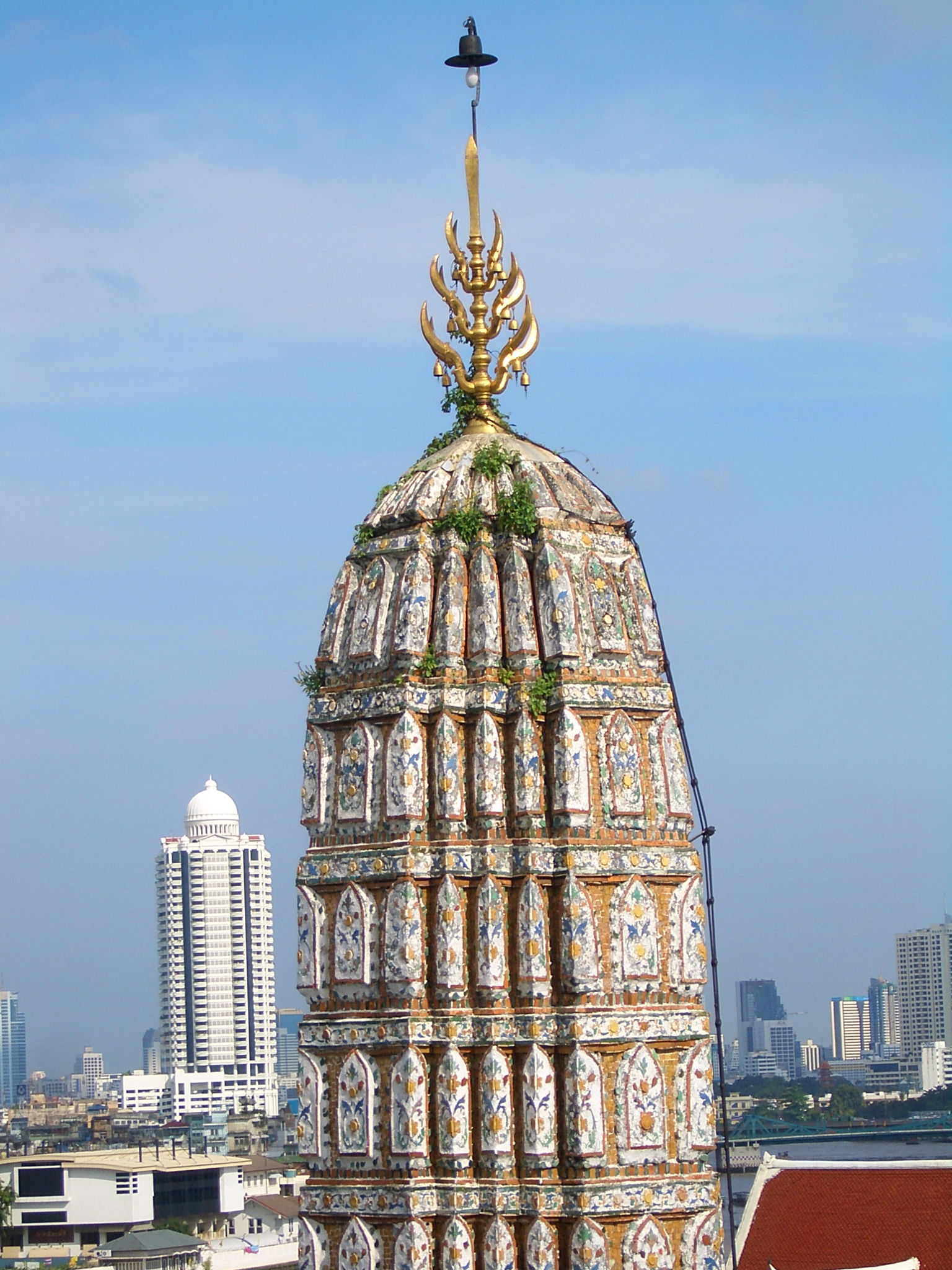
A seven-pronged trishula on top of Wat Arun, also known as the "trident of Shiva".

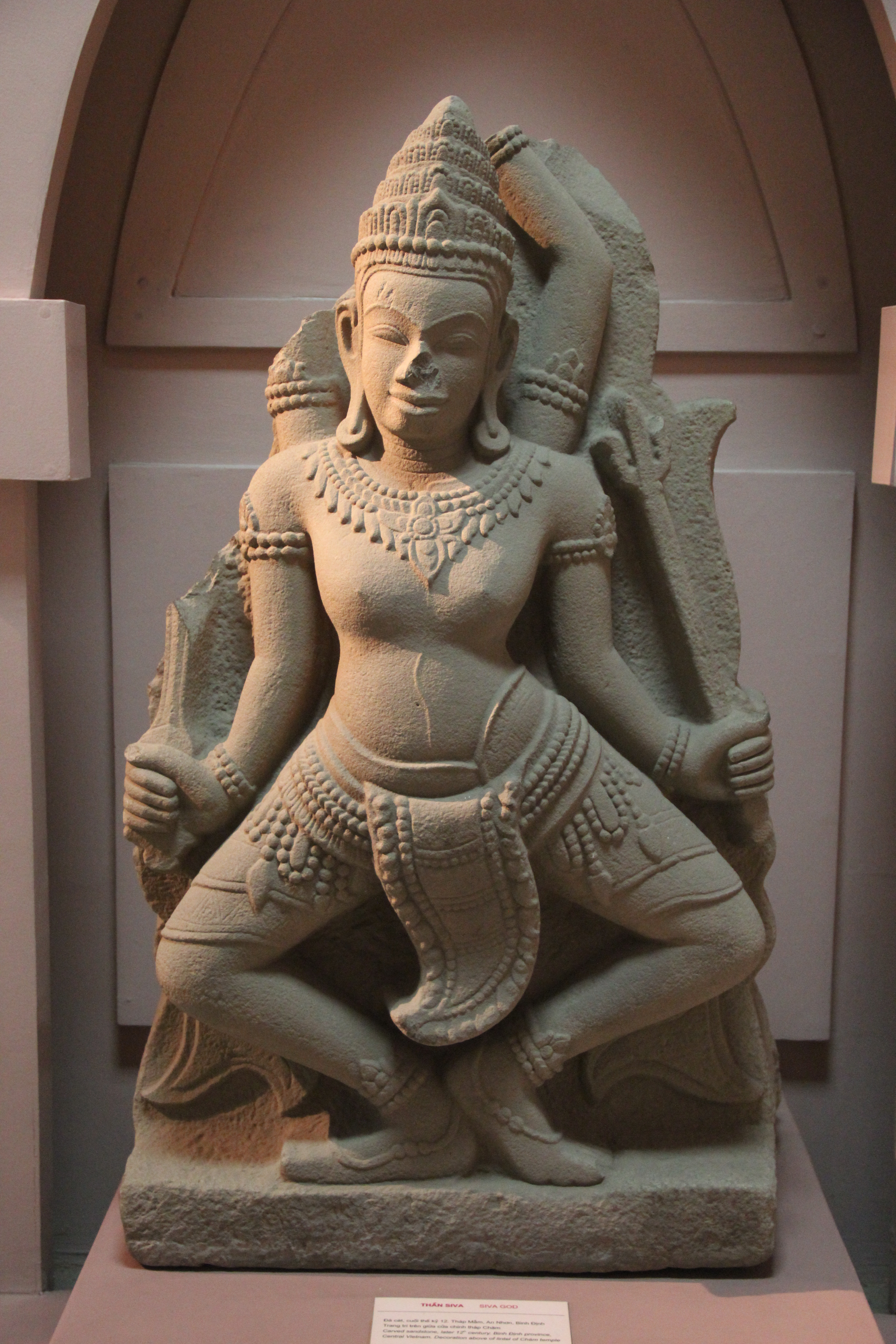
Cham carved sandstone sculpture of Shiva carrying a trishula in Southeast Asia.

Emblem of the Chakri dynasty, the royal house of Thailand founded in 1782. The emblem of the dynasty consists of the trishula intertwined with the Sudarshana Chakra, another weapon, to create a Chakri.

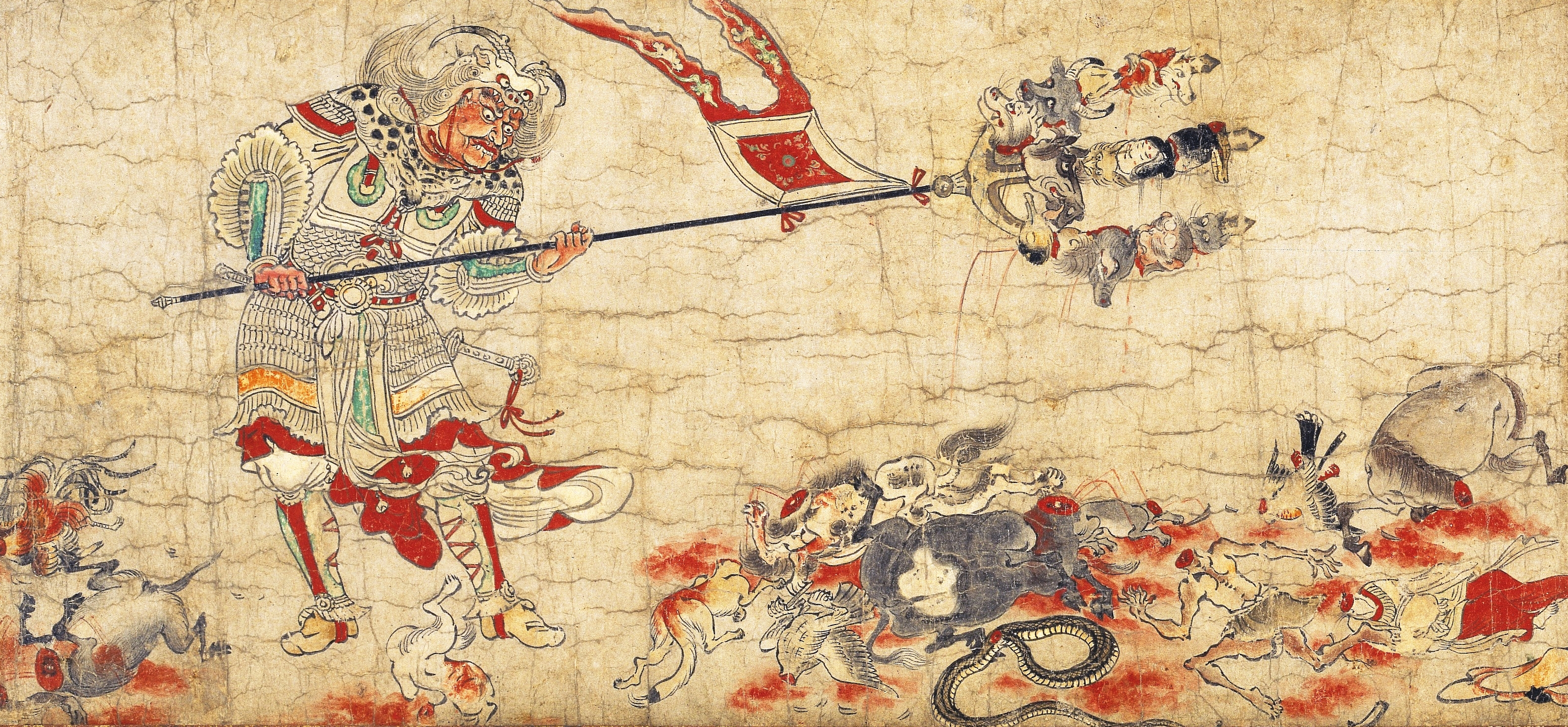
Sendan Kendatsuba (or Candana Gandharva) depicted using his trishula to kill evil animals and demons in the set of paintings Extermination of Evil.

== See also ==
- Kaumodaki
- Pitchfork
- Sai (weapon)
- Tekpi
- Thyrsus
- Trident
- Tryzub
- Columns of Gediminas
