= Witarmin =

Indonesian army general (1925-1987)

Lieutenant general (Ret.) Witarmin
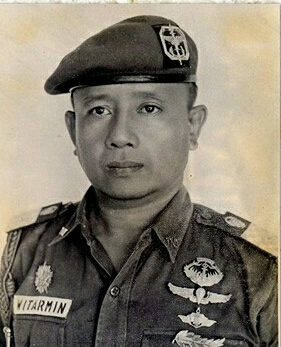

7th Commander of Army Special Forces Command
- In office 1970–1975
- Preceded by: Brig. Gen. Widjojo Soejono
- Succeeded by: Brig. Gen. Yogie Suardi Memet

Personal details
- Born: February 2, 1925 Kertosono, Nganjuk, East Java
- Died: July 5, 1987 (aged 62) Surabaya, East Java, Indonesia

Military service
- Allegiance: Indonesia
- Branch/service: Indonesian army
- Years of service: 1942 - 1983
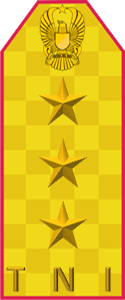
- Rank: Lieutenant general
- Unit: Infantry (Kopassandha)

Lieutenant general (Ret.) Witarmin was an Indonesian National Army commander who crushed the communist rebellion in South Blitar, East Java. Witarmin was captain of Defenders of the Homeland (PETA) in 1942.

== Early life ==
Witarmin was born in Kutorejo, Kertosono, Kutorejo, Kertosono, Nganjuk, East Java on 2 February 1925. He was the grandson of Carik Kertosono and the only child of Samin Sastra Miharjo and Wiji. Since childhood he lived in Kutorejo, Kertosono. First of all the education he took was Vervolkachool and Schakelschool, then H.I.S, all three of which were basic education during the Dutch colonial era. Considering the socio-economic conditions of his parents, he was forced not to attend secondary school. However, he was not a static child from childhood until he was a teenager, he was a dynamic young man. He was also adopted as a child by Kiai Haji Machrus Ali. Kiai Machrus is the Chair of the East Java NU Syuriah and caretaker of the Nirboyo Islamic Boarding School, Kediri.

== Military career ==
During the Japanese occupation, he entered Resentai (Military Education) in Magelang, then continued in Bogor. He graduated from the first class with the rank of shodancho or platoon commander. From 1943, he was assigned as a soldier in PETA at Dai I Saidan at the dormitory Sukorame, Kediri. His close friends who helped him in the war in Kertosono were Amir Murtono, Imam Samudi, Subkan, Kartijo. In 1965, during the communist rebellion in South Blitar, Witarmin led the extermination of PKI. His services were immortalized by the construction of a statue of Colonel Inf Witarmin in Blitar and the Trisula Monument.

== Death ==
Witarmin died on July 9, 1987, in DR. Soetomo Hospital Surabaya because he suffered from liver disease and diabetes, and was buried at JL. Bandung Taman Makam Pahlawan. Currently his name has been immortalized as the name of the street, Jl. Lt. Gen. Witarmin, Dadapan, Kedung Bunder, District. Sutojayan, Blitar Regency.
