= Garuda Indonesian Airways Flight 206 =

1981 aircraft hijacking

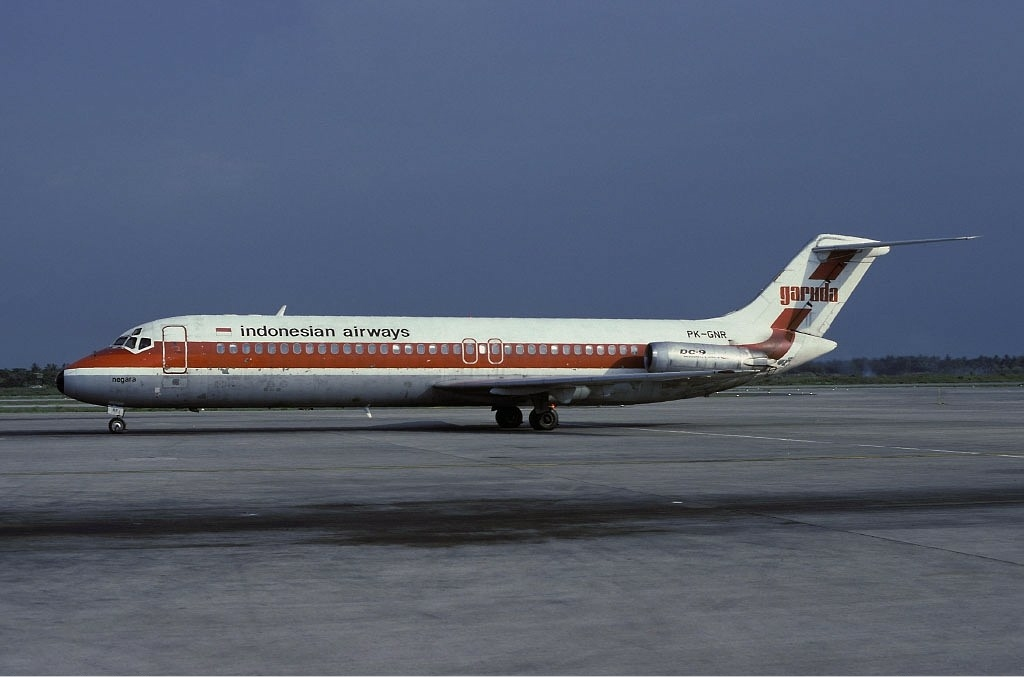
- A DC-9-32 of Garuda Indonesia, similar to the aircraft involved in the incident

Hijacking
- Date: 28 March 1981
- Summary: Hijacking
- Site: Don Mueang Airport, Bangkok, Thailand

Aircraft
- Aircraft type: McDonnell Douglas DC-9-32
- Aircraft name: Woyla
- Operator: Garuda Indonesian Airways
- Registration: PK-GNJ
- Flight origin: Kemayoran Airport, Jakarta
- Stopover: Talang Betutu Airport, Palembang
- Destination: Polonia Airport, Medan
- Fatalities: 7 (5 hijackers, 1 Kopassus commando, and the pilot)

Garuda Indonesian Airways Flight 206 was a Garuda Indonesia flight that was hijacked on 28 March 1981, by the Komando Jihad in Indonesia. The McDonnell Douglas DC-9, registration PK-GNJ, was hijacked on a domestic flight and forced to land at Don Mueang International Airport in Bangkok, Thailand. The hijackers demanded the release of their confederates from Indonesian jails and issued other demands. Three days later, the aircraft was stormed by Kopassus special forces unit that specializes in counterterrorism and hostage rescue. In the ensuing operation, all five hijackers were killed, while the pilot and one Kopassus operative were fatally wounded. All passengers were rescued.

== Incident ==
The McDonnell Douglas DC-9, named Woyla, was scheduled to take off from Sultan Mahmud Badaruddin II Airport in Palembang, South Sumatra, on Saturday morning, 28 March 1981. The pilot was Captain Herman Rante. The plane departed Kemayoran Airport in Jakarta at 08:00 and was scheduled to arrive at Polonia International Airport in Medan, North Sumatra, at 10:55. After take-off, five men with revolvers stood up from their seats. Some pointed their guns at the pilot, while others patrolled the aisle, monitoring passengers. They demanded the pilot fly to Colombo, Sri Lanka, but the plane did not have enough fuel, so they refueled at Penang International Airport in Bayan Lepas, Malaysia. When they were refueling, the hijackers removed an older woman, Hulda Panjaitan from the plane, due to her emotional state. Subsequently, the plane took off and landed at Don Mueang Airport in Bangkok. Once there, the hijackers read out their demands. The primary demand was the release of 80 individuals recently imprisoned in Indonesia following the "Cicendo Event" two weeks earlier, where Islamists attacked a police station in the Cicendo sub-district of Bandung. The hijackers also demanded $1.5 million USD, that Adam Malik be suspended from the post of Vice President of Indonesia, and that every Israeli be deported from Indonesia. They also specified the release of one of their comrades at a secret location. The hijackers told Thai police to deliver their demands to the Indonesian government, and threatened to blow up the plane with all the passengers and crew aboard if their demands were not met.

=== Operation Woyla ===
Operation Woyla
Date	1 April 1981
Location	Don Mueang International Airport, Bangkok, Thailand
Result	Kopassus and RTAF Victory

Belligerents
Indonesia; Thailand	Komando Jihad

Commanders and leaders
(Indonesia) L. B. Moerdani (Indonesia) Sintong Panjaitan	Imran bin Muhammad Zein (surrendered)

Units involved
Indonesian Army; Kopassus; RTAF; Special Operations Regiment (SOR)	No specific units

Strength
35 Kopassus soldiers 20 RTAF Commandos	5 hijackers

Casualties and losses
1 soldier dead from Kopassus	4 hijackers dead (1 died on the flight back to Jakarta)
- 1 civilian dead

The Deputy Commander of the Armed Forces, Admiral Sudomo, immediately ordered the Indonesian Army's Kopassus, to conduct a terrorists raid to rescue the hostages. The commandos borrowed a McDonnell Douglas from Garuda Indonesian Airways that was similar to the hijacked plane for three days to rehearse a raiding. The team was armed with new weapons, including Heckler & Koch MP5s. They set off for Thailand using a Garuda Indonesian Airways McDonnell Douglas DC-10. On Monday, 31 March 1981, the team was ready, but the Thai government did not give permission for Indonesian forces to take over the aircraft as it was on Thai territory. In desperation, the Indonesian Strategic Intelligence Chief Benny Moerdani contacted a friend at the Central Intelligence Agency (CIA) station in Bangkok to persuade the Thai government to give permission.

The Thai government finally approved the raid with the assistance from the Air Force Commando of the RTAF Security Force Command. On Tuesday, 31 March, the team began the hostage rescue operation, dividing themselves into three groups: Red Team, Blue Team, and Green Team. The Red and Blue teams were to be at the plane's rear while the Green team was to enter from the back door of the plane. Members of the Royal Thai Air Force Commando team were positioned on the tarmac in the event hijackers tried to escape. When the Kopassus team entered the plane, the hijackers were surprised and fired at the team, but three of the hijackers were killed when the team returned fire. One of the Kopassus commandos was shot, probably by his comrades, as was the pilot, also probably by Kopassus commandos. The rest of the hostages were released unharmed. Two of the hijackers surrendered to Royal Thai Air Force Commando, but they were extrajudicially killed by the Kopassus commandos on the plane trip back to Jakarta.

== Aftermath ==
Achmad Kirang, the wounded Kopassus team member who was shot in the abdomen, died the following day on 1 April 1981 at Bhumibol Adulyadej Hospital in Bangkok. Captain Herman Rante, the plane's pilot who was shot in the crossfire, also died in Bangkok a few days later. Kirang and Rante's remains were transported from Bangkok to Jakarta, where they were both later interred in Kalibata Heroes' Cemetery.

The aircraft was renamed to 'Porong'

The entire Kopassus team, including leader Lieutenant Colonel Sintong Panjaitan, were awarded the Bintang Sakti by the Indonesian government and were promoted. Achmad Kirang was posthumously double promoted. The incident also inspired the creation of a specialized counter terrorism unit named Den-81 Now Sat-81 Kopassus.

== In popular culture ==
A film based on the incident was scheduled for production in 2014, but was cancelled due to financial issues.

== See also ==
- Air France Flight 8969
- Singapore Airlines Flight 117
