= Yogie Suardi Memet =

Indonesian general and politician (1929–2007)

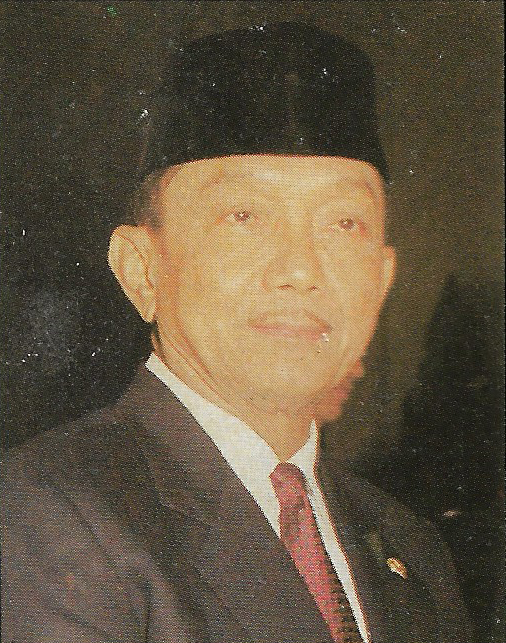
- Yogie as Minister of Home Affairs

Minister of Home Affairs
- In office 17 March 1993 – 14 March 1998
- President: Suharto
- Preceded by: Rudini
- Succeeded by: Hartono

Governor of West Java
- In office 22 May 1985 – 1993
- Preceded by: Aang Kunaefi
- Succeeded by: Nana Nuriana

Personal details
- Born: 16 May 1929 Cirebon, Dutch East Indies
- Died: 7 June 2007 (aged 78) Bandung, Indonesia

Military service
- Allegiance: Indonesia
- Branch/service: Indonesian Army
- Rank: Lieutenant general

Raden Muhammad Yogie Suardi Memet (16 May 1929 – 7 June 2007) was an Indonesian military officer who also served as Minister of Home Affairs under Suharto between 1993 and 1998, and as Governor of West Java between 1985 and 1993. He was also commander of the special forces unit Kopassandha and of the Siliwangi Military Region.

Born in Cirebon, Yogie joined the armed forces as a student soldier during the Indonesian National Revolution, and continued to serve in the army. Darul Islam leader Abdul Kahar Muzakkar was killed by a soldier under his command in 1965, and by 1975 he had been appointed as commander of the special forces unit Kopassandha. He oversaw Kopassandha's operations in East Timor during the Indonesian invasion, although later on he was appointed to other posts and he passed on command of Kopassandha in 1983. After his military career, he became governor of West Java in 1985, his second term being interrupted in 1993 when he was appointed as Home Affairs Minister. During his tenure as minister, he actively intervened within the Indonesian Democratic Party in order to disrupt the party's capability to challenge the New Order government.

== Early life and career ==
Yogie was born in Cirebon on 16 May 1929. He graduated from the colonial elementary school (Hollandsch-Inlandsche School) in 1942, from middle school in 1945, and from a high school in 1950. During the Indonesian National Revolution, he fought as a guerilla soldier in a student unit, operating in Cirebon. He also participated in fighting against the Indonesian Communist Party in the Madiun Affair. After the revolution, he joined the armed forces, participating in operations against the Darul Islam rebellion in West Java and later against the Revolutionary Government of the Republic of Indonesia.

== Later military career ==
In 1965, Yogie as a major was commander of the 330th airborne infantry battalion assigned to Sulawesi tasked with hunting down Darul Islam leader Abdul Kahar Muzakkar. On 3 February that year, one of the soldiers under his command found and killed Muzakkar. Later that year, Yogie also took part in crackdowns against the Indonesian Communist Party. Between 1970 and 1973, as a lieutenant colonel, Yogie was commander of the 15th Infantry Brigade within Siliwangi. In 1974, he was assigned to the Garuda Contingent under the United Nations Emergency Force II in Egypt.

On 31 May 1975, Yogie as a colonel was appointed as commander of the Kopassandha special forces unit, having been its deputy commander for two years at that point. Shortly after he took command, he organized several platoons of special forces which were to infiltrate into Portuguese Timor to support and liaise with pro-Indonesian partisans. By 1976, after the Indonesian invasion of East Timor, Yogie had been promoted to brigadier general and Kopassandha under him launched paratrooper operations, including the capture of Suai in February. Later on, he was concurrently appointed as commander of the Siliwangi Military Command in West Java (1978), and further on as commander of the 2nd Military Region covering Java and Madura (1983). Due to his other postings, Yogie tended to leave Kopassandha's operations to his deputies. He was replaced as Kopassandha commander by Wismoyo Arismunandar in March 1983. By the time he left Kopassandha, Yogie had been promoted once more to major general. He had been promoted to lieutenant general by April 1983.

== Governor and minister ==
On 20 May 1985, Yogie was appointed and sworn in as governor of West Java. He was reelected in 1990 for a second term. He popularized the motto "Tibmanra" (Tertib, Aman, dan Sejahtera/Orderly, Safe, and Prosperous) during his tenure. His second term was cut short when he was appointed as Minister of Home Affairs in 1993. Despite his appointment as minister, he held on to the gubernatorial position for around another month.

As home affairs minister, Yogie paused an ongoing project to centralize identity card data. In December 1993, Yogie attempted to install his former vice governor in West Java, the ethnically Sundanese Karna Suwanda, as governor of Central Kalimantan. Suwanda's candidacy, however, was hotly contested by local residents who wanted a governor hailing from there. While Suwanda won the legislative vote against a local candidate, this caused a significant unrest in the region, and the central government eventually backed down with both Suwanda and the local candidate being made to withdraw their candidacies. In an attempt to calm the situation, Yogie installed a caretaker governor, giving assurances to local politicians that the caretaker was ineligible to run as governor. Eventually, Warsito Rasman, a bureaucrat, was appointed by Yogie and was elected without further incident in 1994.

In July 1993, Yogie utilized thugs to disrupt an Indonesian Democratic Party (PDI) congress in Medan, and as a result of the chaos he managed to invalidate the election of Suryadi as chairman. In response, the party launched an extraordinary congress in December 1993 which resulted in Megawati Sukarnoputri being elected chairman. This result caused dismay in the Suharto government, and Yogie met with Megawati later that month. In behalf of Suharto's government, Yogie informed Megawati that the government would accept the election result, provided the party hold another national congress and include a number of government-selected members into the party's leadership. The government would acknowledge the party's leadership by February 1994. The party members appointed by the government were opposed to Megawati's leadership, and Yogie continued to support them to weaken Megawati. By 1996, Yogie along with others such as Feisal Tanjung and Syarwan Hamid were tasked by Suharto to remove Megawati from PDI's leadership, as Megawati was becoming an increasing challenge to Suharto's presidency. In order to do this, the government sponsored a competing congress in Medan which elected the previously ousted Suryadi as PDI chairman. Megawati and her supporters refused to accept the congress' outcome and continued to occupy PDI's offices in Jakarta, resulting in the 27 July 1996 incident when thugs assaulted the building and five people died.

When the government began planning to move Indonesia's capital from Jakarta to Jonggol, Yogie planned for a direct road between the two, going through the present-day developments in Cibubur and Cileungsi. The road is named the Transyogi Road after him. After his ministerial tenure, he was appointed as a member of the Supreme Advisory Council in June 1998, serving until 2003.

== Family and death ==
He was married to Emmy Sariamah, and had two children.

Yogie died on 7 June 2007 at Bandung's Advent Hospital due to kidney failure. He had suffered from the disease for four years prior to his death, and he had been in intensive care for a month prior to his death. He was buried at Cikutra Heroes' Cemetery in Bandung the following day.
