= Commander of Kopassus =

Highest position of Kopassus (the Indonesian Special Forces Command)

- Panglima Komando Pasukan Khusus
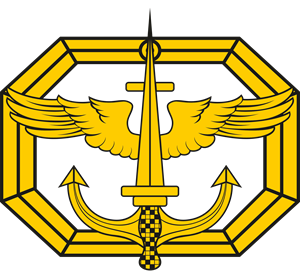
- Insignia of Kopassus

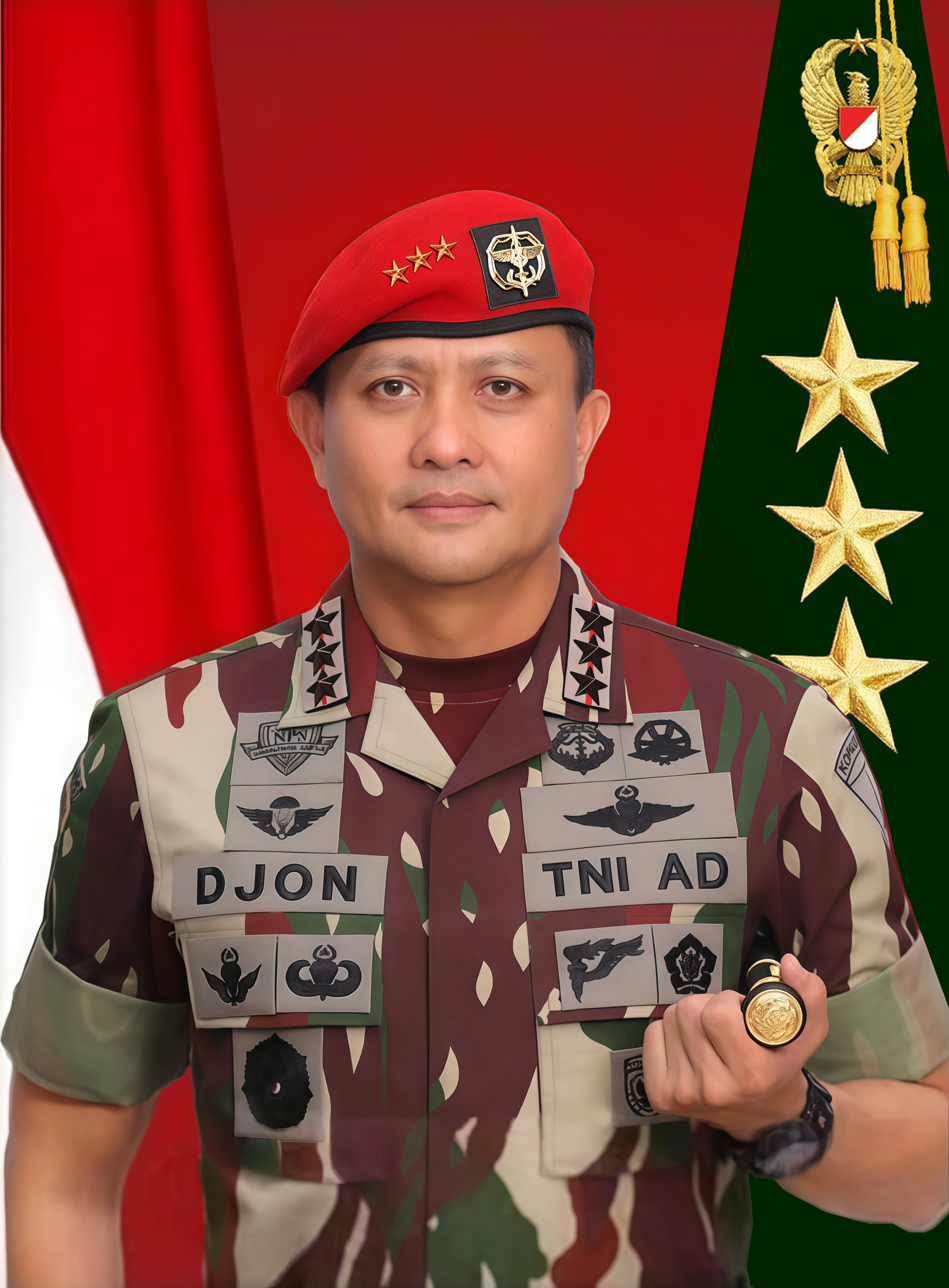
- Incumbent; Lieutenant General Djon Afriandi since 2025
- Indonesian Army
- Style: Pangkopassus
- Reports to: Chief of Staff of the Indonesian Army
- Seat: Kopassus Headquarters, Cijantung – Jakarta
- Appointer: Commander of the Indonesian National Armed Forces; on the recommendation of the Chief of Staff of the Army
- Formation: 1952
- First holder: Mochammad Idjon Djanbi
- Deputy: Deputy Commander of Kopassus
- Website: tniad.mil.id

The Commander of Kopassus (Indonesian: Panglima Komando Pasukan Khusus, abbreviated Pangkopassus) is the highest leadership position within the Indonesian Army Special Forces Command (Kopassus). The post is held by an officer with the rank of Lieutenant General and reports directly to the Commander of the Indonesian National Armed Forces.

The Commander of Kopassus is regarded as one of the most strategic positions within the Indonesian National Armed Forces. Officers who have held this post often go on to have distinguished careers. Notable figures include Sintong Panjaitan, who later served as a presidential adviser; Agum Gumelar, who held various ministerial positions; and Prabowo Subianto, who became President.

== List of Commanders of Kopassus ==
List of Commanders of Kopassus since establishment
No.	Portrait	Rank	Name	Start of term	End of term	Remarks
3rd Territorial Forces Command (Kesatuan Komando Tentara Teritorium III/Siliwangi)
1		Major	Idjon Djanbi	1952	1953	
1	Army Commando Corps (Korps Komando Angkatan Darat)					
1		Major	Idjon Djanbi	1953	1956	
Army Para-Commando Regiment (Resimen Para Komando Angkatan Darat)
2		Major	R. E. Djailani	1956		
3		Major	Kaharuddin Nasution	1956	1958	
4		Lieutenant Colonel	Mung Parhadimulyo	1958	1964	
5		Colonel	Sarwo Edhie Wibowo	1964	1966	
5	Army Special Forces Center (Pusat Pasukan Khusus Angkatan Darat)					
5		Colonel	Sarwo Edhie Wibowo	1966	1967	
6		Brigadier General	Widjojo Soejono	1967	1970	
6	Sandi Yudha Forces Command (Komando Pasukan Sandi Yudha)					
6		Brigadier General	Widjojo Soejono	1970	1971	
7		Brigadier General	Witarmin	1971	1975	
8		Brigadier General	Yogie Suardi Memet	1975	1983	
9		Brigadier General	Wismoyo Arismunandar	1983	1986	
Army Special Forces Command (Komando Pasukan Khusus Angkatan Darat)
10		Brigadier General	Sintong Panjaitan	1986	1987	
11		Brigadier General	Kuntara	1987	1992	
12		Brigadier General	Tarub	1992	1993	
13		Brigadier General	Agum Gumelar	1993	1994	
14		Brigadier General	Subagyo Hadi Siswoyo	1994	1995	
15		Major General	Prabowo Subianto	1995	1998	
16		Major General	Muchdi Purwoprandjono	1998		
17		Major General	Syahrir MS	1998	2000	
18		Major General	Amirul Isnaini	2000	2002	
19		Major General	Sriyanto Muntasram	2002	2005	
20		Major General	Syaiful Rizal	2005	2006	
21		Major General	Rasyid Qurnuen Aquary	2006	2007	
22		Major General	Soenarko	2007	2008	
23		Major General	Pramono Edhie Wibowo	2008	2009	
24		Major General	Lodewijk Freidrich Paulus	2009	2011	
25		Major General	Wisnu Bawa Tenaya	2011	2012	
26		Major General	Agus Sutomo	2012	2014	
27		Major General	Doni Monardo	2014	2015	
28		Major General	Muhammad Herindra	2015	2016	
29		Major General	Madsuni	2016	2018	
30		Major General	Eko Margiyono	2018	2019	
31		Major General	I Nyoman Cantiasa	2019	2020	
32		Major General	Mohamad Hasan	2020	2021	
33		Major General	Teguh Muji Angkasa	2021	2022	
34		Major General	Widi Prasetijono	2022		
35		Major General	Iwan Setiawan	2022	2023	
36		Major General	Deddy Suryadi	2023	2024	
37		Major General	Djon Afriandi	2024	2025	
37	Commander of Kopassus (Panglima Komando Pasukan Khusus)					
37		Lieutenant General	Djon Afriandi	2025	Incumbent	

Note: The rank listed is the rank held while serving as Commander of Kopassus or its equivalent title in the past.

== See also ==
- Indonesian National Armed Forces
- Indonesian Army
