= 15th Infantry Brigade (Indonesia) =

- Brigade Infanteri 15/Kujang II
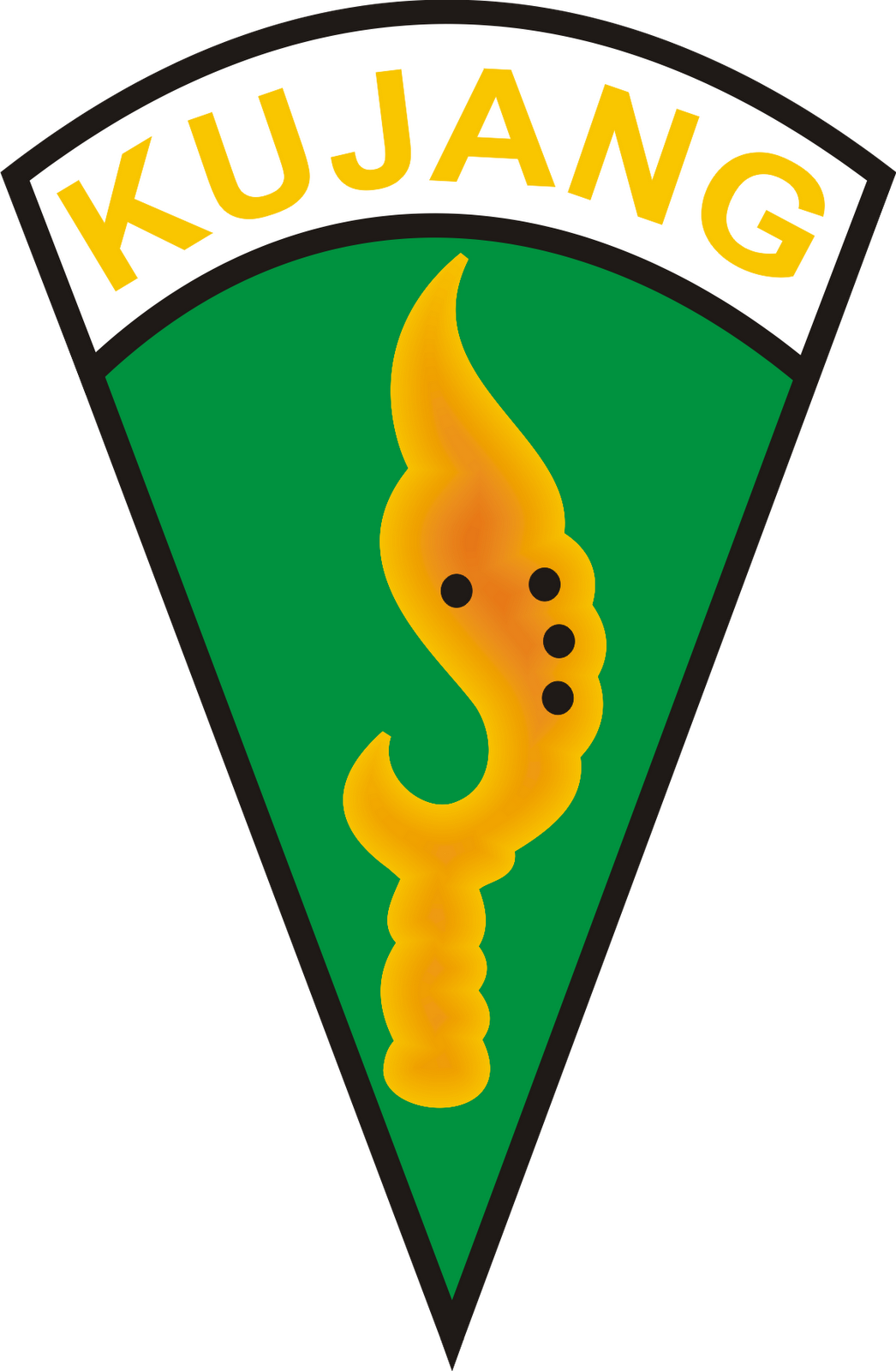
- Logo of the 15th Infantry Brigade
- Founded: 31 October 1962
- Branch: Indonesian Army
- Part of: Kodam Siliwangi
- Garrison/HQ: Cimahi, West Java

The 15th Infantry Brigade (Indonesian: Brigade Infanteri 15/Kujang II; abbr. Brigif 15/Kujang 2) is an infantry brigade of the Indonesian Army under the Siliwangi Military Command. Established in 1962, it is based in Cimahi and consists of three infantry battalions.

== History ==
The brigade was initially formed by order of Kodam Siliwangi's commander on 15 December 1962 (though the unit celebrates its anniversary as 31 October 1962). It initially received the nickname "Tirtayasa" and was provisionally based in Sukabumi. Its initial composition contained the brigade headquarters along with the 310th, 320th, and 327th Infantry Battalions. Its nickname was changed to Kujang II in 1970, following the absorption of Siliwangi's 17th Infantry Brigade/Kujang to Kostrad.

In 1963, the brigade took part in Operation Masohi in Seram, Maluku, to wipe out the remnants of the Republic of South Maluku (RMS). The brigade was credited with the capture of RMS President Chris Soumokil and the chief of staff of its armed forces Sopamena, both in December 1963. During the Indonesia–Malaysia Confrontation, the 15th Brigade was stationed in Riau, and then it took part in purges against the Indonesian Communist Party mostly in Jakarta and West Java.

As of 2025, the brigade is based in Cimahi, West Java. Some of its units, such as the 310th Battalion, has been deployed to the Indonesia–Papua New Guinea border.

== Organization ==
As of 2023, the brigade contains the following units:

- 15th Infantry Brigade
  - Brigade HQ
  - 301st Raider Infantry Battalion – based in Cimalaka, Sumedang. Previously under territorial command, transferred to the brigade in 2021.
  - 310th Infantry Battalion – based in Sukabumi.
  - 312th Infantry Battalion – based in Subang.

Other battalions which had been part of the brigade include the 315th, 320th, and 327th Infantry Battalions.

== Notable members ==
- Yogie Suardi Memet, brigade commander (1970–1973), later Governor of West Java and Minister of Home Affairs
