= Widjojo Soejono =

Indonesian military officer (1928–2022)

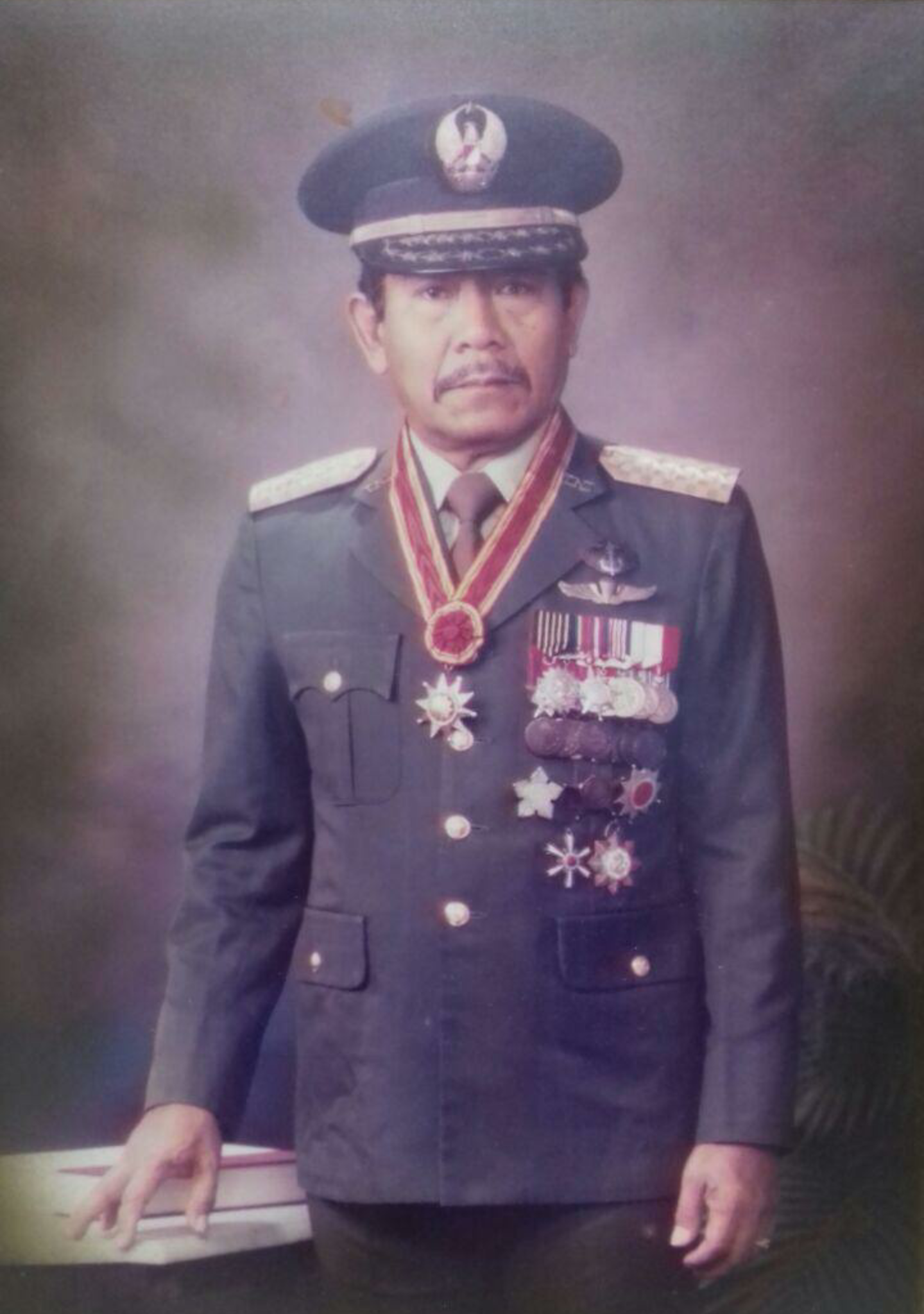

6th Commander of Army Special Forces Center
- In office 1967–1970
- Preceded by: Colonel Sarwo Edhie Wibowo
- Succeeded by: Brigadier General Witarmin

Personal details
- Born: May 9, 1928 (Dutch East Indies) Tulungagung, East Java
- Died: May 11, 2022 (aged 94) (Indonesia) Central Jakarta
- Spouse: Ny. Siti Mastoechajah
- Relations: Martodidjojo (father); Roesmirah (mother); Soewondo (brother); Widjojo Soeprapto (brother)

Military service
- Allegiance: Indonesia
- Branch/service: Indonesian Army
- Years of service: 1945–1982
- Rank: General
- Unit: Infantry (Kopassandha)

Widjojo Soejono (9 May 1928 – 11 May 2022) was a four-star rank general in the Indonesian Army and the former Commander of Puspasus (now Kopassus) from 1967 to 1970.

== Profile ==
=== Early life ===
Widjojo Soejono was born in Tulungagung, East Java on 9 May 1928, as the youngest son of 15 brothers with his father Martodidjojo whose ancestors came from Surakarta and Roesmirah whose ancestors came from Yogyakarta.

He went to a Hollandsch-Inlandsche School continuing to the Technical School. He was in the same class as Soewoto Sukendar who later became Chief of Staff of the Indonesian Air Force and Widodo Budidarmo who later became the Chief of the Indonesian National Police.

=== Military career ===
Widjojo Soejono left school at the age of 17 to take part in the training of Defender of the Homeland Voluntary Army Officers (PETA) in Bogor in early 1945. After graduating he was placed in Battalion 4, based in Malang. After the disbandment of PETA two days after the Proclamation of Indonesian Independence, he joined his senior Soehardjo to form the People's Security Agency (BKR) at Hogere Burgerschool Straat which, now Jalan Wijaya Kusuma, Surabaya, units which later became TNI Regiment 33, Division VI/Narotama.

After the war he served as Commander of Kopassus from 1967 to 1970, Commander of Kodam XIII/Merdeka from 1970 to 1971, Commander of Kodam V/Brawijaya from 1971 to 1975. He took part in operational command during Operation Seroja and became Chief of Staff of Kopkamtib from 1980 to 1982.

== Personal life ==
He married Siti Mastoechajah and had five children: Enny Lukitaning Diah, Wedhia Purwaningsih, Ariyati Sihwarini, Hardini Surjaningsih, and Budhi Soejono.

Widjojo Soejono, died on 11 May 2022, aged 94, at Gatot Soebroto Army Hospital due to an unspecified cause and Soejono was buried with military honours at Kalibata Heroes' Cemetery, South Jakarta on May 11, 2022, at 13.30 WIB.
