= Herman Sarens Soediro =

Indonesian military officer (1930–2010)

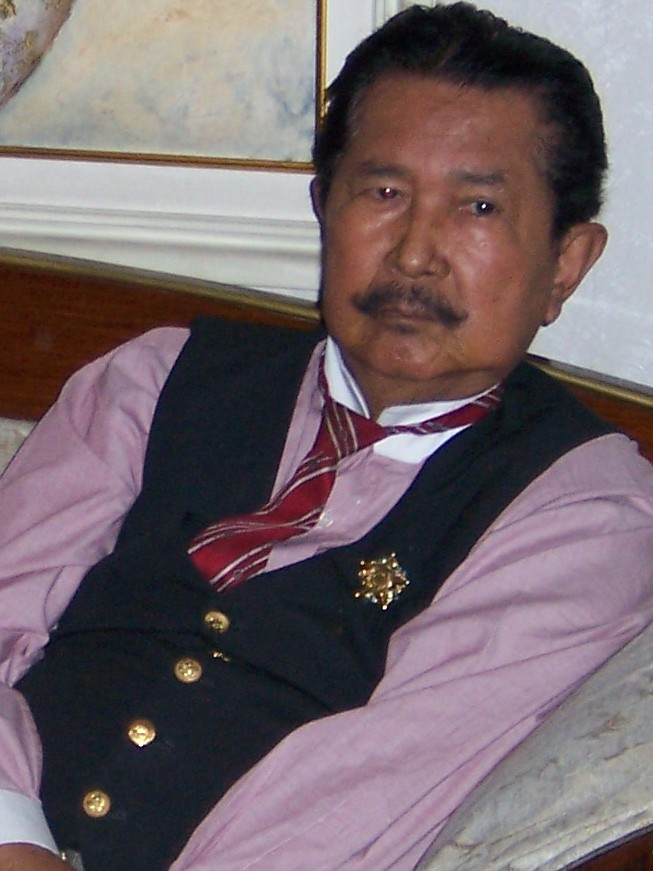
- Soediro in 2007
- Born: 24 May 1930; Pandeglang, Dutch East Indies
- Died: 11 July 2010 (aged 80); Jakarta, Indonesia
- Military career
- Allegiance: Indonesia
- Branch: Indonesian Army
- Rank: Brigadier general

Herman Sarens Soediro (24 May 1930 – 11 July 2010) was an Indonesian military officer and businessman. He served within the Indonesian Army in various roles, taking action during the Indonesian National Revolution, the Darul Islam rebellion, and the 30 September movement. Reaching the rank of brigadier general before the Malari incident resulted in his loss of favor, he turned to private business in his later life.

== Early life ==
Soediro was born on 24 May 1930 in Pandeglang, today in Banten. He was a son of Raden Soediro Wirio Soehardjo. In his teens, he joined the fledgling Indonesian Army as a student corps member in Banjar, as a part of the Siliwangi Military District during the Indonesian National Revolution. He initially took part in the Siliwangi Division's relocation to Central Java following the Renville Agreement, but due to a Dutch ambush he was separated from his unit and instead joined a guerilla force in West Java. His father was also part of Siliwangi, and was killed during Operation Product.

== Military career ==
After the end of the revolution, Soediro became a major within Siliwangi and commanded a battalion. His battalion took part in operations against the Darul Islam rebellion during the early 1950s, primarily in a civilian security role. He was later tasked with training paratroopers to infiltrate Western New Guinea and in preparation for the Indonesia–Malaysia Confrontation.

By 1965, Soediro as a lieutenant colonel had been tasked with the security and patrols of the Indonesian Armed Forces HQ. On 28 September 1965, Soediro and another higher-ranked officer Josef Muskita had received intelligence of a potential attempt to kidnap army generals and reported their findings to Kodam Jayakarta commander Umar Wirahadikusumah who angrily dismissed the report. The two then went to Suharto, then commander of the Army Strategic Reserves, who received the report more calmly. In the morning of 1 October, shortly after the 30 September movement had kidnapped a number of Indonesian Army generals, Soediro departed for the home of D. I. Pandjaitan in response to reports of disturbances by attackers. Soediro found Pandjaitan's home in a heavily damaged state, with blood stains and bullet holes. After finding out that Pandjaitan had been captured, Soediro along with Muskita made a report on the incident to Suharto. After receiving the report, Suharto sent Soediro on another messenger duty, this time to special forces commander Sarwo Edhie Wibowo. After Soediro's report, Sarwo led his men to Monas, beginning the purge against the Indonesian Communist Party. In a later recollection, Soediro boasted of his role in the purges, remarking that he "ran over a hundred men with a tank".

Following Suharto's ascent to presidency, Soediro was promoted to colonel and appointed as the commanding officer of Suharto's personal guard. He was further appointed as commander of the Indonesian Armed Forces' HQ Corps and received another promotion to brigadier general. He was further tasked by First Lady Tien Suharto to acquire land for the Taman Mini Indonesia Indah project. During the 15 January protests, Soediro along with General Sumitro addressed the protesters. Due to Sumitro's failure to prevent the protests in the first place, he was discredited and removed from his post. Soediro, who was close to him, also fell from grace and was removed from his military commands. He was reassigned as Indonesia's chargé d'affaires ad interim in Madagascar on 17 January 1975.

== Later life ==
While assigned to Madagascar, Herman spent his time by hunting and later smuggled Zanzibar cloves from the country to Indonesia. He was later recalled to Indonesia due to this activity once it was discovered in 1977. Once fully retired from the armed forces, Herman established a nightclub and expanded his private business interests to hotels and boxing rings. He also became a boxing promoter, one of his first high-profile matches being that of Saoul Mamby vs Thomas Americo. He also took up acting roles, appearing in at least 12 movies.

Around 1970, Herman had acquired control of a 3-hectare plot of land in South Jakarta, and converted it to an equestrian and sports club which was active until the fall of Suharto. The Armed Forces Headquarters sued Soediro, claiming that the land had been donated to the armed forces and that Soediro who was a representative had illegally maintained control over it and failed to properly convert the land to institutional ownership. According to the armed forces, Soediro was offered a 2.5-hectare plot in Bekasi and some cash for the land in 1986, but he rejected the offer. Since 2005, Soediro was listed in the Indonesian Armed Forces' wanted list related to the dispute. Soediro was arrested by military police in January 2010 after he failed to appear at a military tribunal, and he eventually agreed to cede the land to the armed forces following the Jakarta Military Tribunal's decision in June 2010.

Soediro died at the Pertamina Central Hospital on 11 July 2010 due to complications from his heart and kidney disease. He was buried with a military funeral the following day at his family's cemetery in Banjar, West Java.

== Family ==
Soediro was married twice, and from the marriages he had four children. He married his first wife Tinawati on 21 August 1958. His second wife, Hadijah, whom he married in 1967, was the widowed second wife of Ahmad Yani.
