= Sarwo Edhie Wibowo =

Indonesian military leader (1925–1989)

General (Hn.) (Ret.) Sarwo Edhie Wibowo
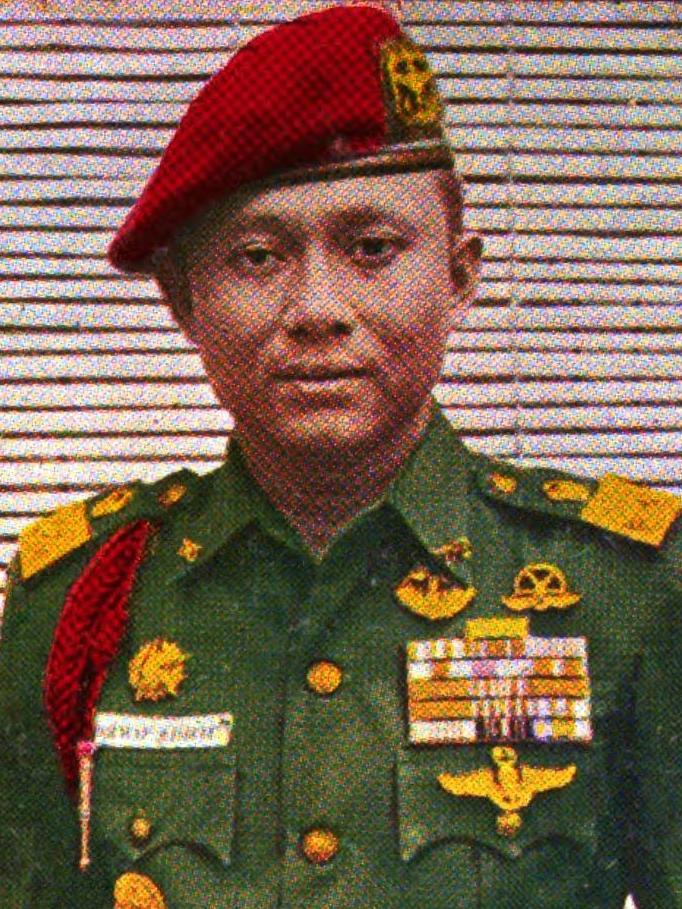
- Portrait of Sarwo Edhie Wibowo

Ambassador of Indonesia to South Korea
- In office May 1974 – May 1978
- Preceded by: Position established; Benny Moerdani (acting)
- Succeeded by: Kaharuddin Nasution

Commander of Kodam XVII/Cenderawasih
- In office 2 July 1968 – 20 February 1970
- President: Suharto
- Preceded by: Brig. Gen. Bintoro
- Succeeded by: Brig. Gen. Acub Zainal

7th Commander of Kodam II/Bukit Barisan
- In office 25 June 1967 – 2 July 1968
- President: Suharto
- Preceded by: Brig. Gen. Sobiran
- Succeeded by: Brig. Gen. Leo Lopulisa

5th Commander of RPKAD/Puspassus AD
- In office 1964–1967
- President: Sukarno; Suharto
- Preceded by: Lt. Col. Mung Parhadimulyo
- Succeeded by: Brig. Gen. Widjojo Soejono

Personal details
- Born: 25 July 1927 Purworejo, Dutch East Indies
- Died: 9 November 1989 (aged 62) Jakarta, Indonesia
- Resting place: Purworejo, Central Java
- Spouse: Sunarti Sri Hadiyah (m. 1949)
- Relations: Susilo Bambang Yudhoyono and Hadi Utomo (sons-in-law)
- Children: 7, including Kristiani Herrawati and Pramono Edhie Wibowo
- Occupation: Army officer; diplomat

Military service
- Allegiance: Empire of Japan; Indonesia
- Branch/service: Defenders of the Homeland; Indonesian Army
- Years of service: 1942–1975
- Rank: General (honorary)
- Unit: Infantry (RPKAD)
- Commands: RPKAD/Puspassus AD; Kodam II/Bukit Barisan; Kodam XVII/Cenderawasih
- Battles/wars: Indonesian National Revolution; 30 September Movement; Indonesian mass killings
- Service no.: 11001

Sarwo Edhie Wibowo (25 July 1927 – 9 November 1989) was an Indonesian military leader and the father of Kristiani Herrawati, the former first lady of Indonesia, and the wife of President Susilo Bambang Yudhoyono and also the father of Chief of Staff Pramono Edhie Wibowo. As an army colonel, he played a direct role in directing troops during the Indonesian mass killings of 1965–66, in which more than half a million Indonesian civilians died. With Suharto's blessing, Wibowo initiated the slaughter. Later, he served as Chairman of the BP-7 center, as Indonesia's ambassador to South Korea, and as governor of the Indonesian Military Academy.

On 10 November 2025, he was awarded the title of national hero by President Prabowo Subianto.

== Early life ==
Born in Purworejo, Central Java to a family of civil servants working for the Dutch Colonial Government. As a child, he learned silat as a form of self-defense.

In 1942, when the Japanese took control of Dutch East Indies, Sarwo Edhie went to Surabaya to enlist with the Defenders of the Motherland Army (PETA), a Japanese-run auxiliary force consisting of Indonesian soldiers.

After the Indonesian Declaration of Independence on 17 August 1945, He joined the BKR, a militia organization that would become the precursor of TNI (the present Indonesian Army), and formed a battalion. However, the venture failed and the battalion disbanded. It was his hometown compatriot, Ahmad Yani who encouraged him to continue being a soldier and invited him to join a battalion at Magelang in Central Java.

== Military career ==
=== Career up to 1965 ===
His career in the military saw him serve as a battalion commander in the Diponegoro Division (1945–1951), then regimental commander (1951–1953), deputy regimental commander of the National Military Academy (1959–1961), chief of staff of the army Paracommando Regiment (RPKAD) (1962–1964), and commander of RPKAD (1964–1967).

The RPKAD was the Indonesian government's attempt at creating a special forces unit (going on to become Kopassus) and his appointment as the elite unit's commander was thanks in no small part to Yani. By 1964, Yani had risen to become the army commander and wanted someone whom he could trust as commander of RPKAD.

=== Putting Down The G30S Movement ===
It was during Sarwo Edhie's time as RPKAD Commander that the 30 September Movement happened.

During the morning of 1 October 1965, six Army generals, including Ahmad Yani were kidnapped from their houses and taken to the Indonesian Air Force's Halim Airbase. Whilst this kidnapping process was being executed, a group of unidentified troops occupied the National Monument (Monas), the Presidential Palace, the Republic of Indonesia Radio (RRI), and the telecommunications building.

Sarwo Edhie and his RPKAD troops were at the RPKAD headquarters at Cijantung in Jakarta, where they were joined by Colonel Herman Sarens Soediro. Soediro announced that he was bringing a message from the Kostrad headquarters and informed Sarwo Edhie of the situation in Jakarta. He was also informed by Soediro that Major General Suharto, the Commander of Kostrad had for the moment assumed leadership of the Army. He sent Soediro back with the message that he would side with Suharto.

Once Sudiro left, he was visited by Brigadier General Sabur, the Commander of the Cakrabirawa (Presidential Guard), to which G30S member Lieutenant Colonel Untung belonged. Sabur asked Sarwo Edhie to join the G30S Movement. Sarwo Edhie told Sabur that he was on the side of Suharto, no matter what the cost, and rejected the offer.

At 11 AM that day, he arrived at the Kostrad headquarters and received orders to retake the RRI and Telecommunication buildings at 6 PM (The deadline by which the unidentified troops were expected to surrender). When 6 PM arrived, Sarwo Edhie ordered his troops to retake the designated buildings. This was achieved without much resistance, as the troops there retreated to Halim and the buildings were taken by 6.30 PM.

With the situation at Jakarta secured, Suharto turned his eyes to Halim Air Base. The air base was the place where the kidnapped Generals were taken to and the headquarters of the Air Force unit which had thrown its support behind the G30S Movement. Suharto then ordered Sarwo Edhie to retake the air base. Starting their attack at 2 AM on 2 October, he and the RPKAD had the air base taken by 6 AM.

=== Transition from Old Order to New Order ===
After taking Halim Air Base, he joined Suharto as both of them were summoned to Bogor by President Sukarno. While Suharto found himself admonished by Sukarno for ignoring his orders, he was shocked by Sukarno's insensitivity to the death of the six Generals. To his question "Where are the Generals?", Sukarno responded, "Aren't these things a normality in a revolution?"

On 4 October 1965, his troops would preside over the exhumation of the dead bodies of the Generals from the Lubang Buaya well.

On 16 October 1965, Suharto was appointed Commander of the Army by Sukarno. By then, the Communist Party of Indonesia (PKI) had been accused as the culprits of the G30S, and anti-Communist sentiments had built up sufficiently to gain momentum. Sarwo Edhie was given the task of eliminating PKI members in the Communist hotbeds in Central Java.

There were numerous estimates as to the number of people killed during these months. Early estimates number between half a million at the very least and a million at the most. In December 1965, the number given to Sukarno was 78,000 although after he fell, it was revised to 780,000. The 78,000 was a ploy to hide the number of people killed from Sukarno. Speculations continued throughout the years, ranging from 60,000 to 1,000,000. Although the consensus seemed to have settled around 400,000. Finally, in 1989, before his death, Sarwo Edhie admitted to the People's Representative Council (DPR) members that 3 million were killed in the bloodbath.

By the beginning of 1966, anti-Communist sentiments combined with the high rate of inflation caused Sukarno to begin losing his popularity in the eyes of the Indonesian people. There were now anti-Sukarno protests, led by youth movements such as the Indonesian Student Action Front (KAMI). In a Bandung rally held on 10 January 1966, KAMI issued to Sukarno and the PPCA its Three Demands of the People. They wanted the PKI to be banned, for PKI sympathizers within the Cabinet to be arrested, and for the prices to be lowered.

Suharto realized the importance of aligning the Army with the protesters. During the first months of 1966, he together with Kostrad Chief of Staff, Kemal Idris actively organized and supported the protests whilst making a name for themselves among the KAMI protesters in the process. On 26 February 1966, KAMI was officially banned by Sukarno but with the encouragement of Hi, and Kemal continued to protest. In a show of solidarity with the students, Sarwo Edhie enlisted at the University of Indonesia.

Although he was growing to be Sukarno's biggest political opponent, Suharto, a strong Javanese traditionalist, was always careful to avoid challenging Sukarno directly. By March 1966 however, he was ready to force Sukarno's hand. At the beginning of the month, he ordered the RPKAD to arrest PKI sympathizers within Sukarno's Revised Dwikora Cabinet. Suharto changed his mind at the very last minute, thinking that Sukarno's security might be compromised. However, it was too late to withdraw the orders.

On the morning of 11 March 1966, during a Cabinet meeting in which Suharto was absent, he and his troops surrounded the Presidential Palace without any identification. Sukarno, fearing for his life evacuated to Bogor. Later in the day, he would transfer executive powers to Suharto through a letter called Supersemar.

In 1967, Sarwo Edhie was transferred to Sumatra and was made Commander of Kodam II/Bukit Barisan, ending his years as Commander of the RPKAD. In Sumatra, Sarwo Edhie further weakened Sukarno's powers by banning his Indonesian National Party (PNI) throughout the island.

=== New Order radical ===
His support was firmly with Suharto as the latter began making the moves to ascend to the Presidency. Factionally speaking, however, Sarwo Edhie belonged to a faction dubbed by scholars as "New Order Radicals". Together with Kemal Idris and Kodam VI/Siliwangi Commander Hartono Rekso Dharsono, Sarwo Edhie wanted political parties to be dismantled and replaced with non-ideological groups that emphasized development and modernization.

=== Act of Free Choice ===
For this, he was transferred to West Irian to become the Commander of Kodam XVII/Cendrawasih. In the lead up to the Act of Free Choice, through which Indonesia formally annexed the territory via representative referendum, Sarwo Edhie played a leading role in defeating some Papuan resistance.

=== Exclusion from Government and remaining career ===
Like many who had supported Suharto to power, he grew increasingly dissatisfied with the new President. As the years went on, Suharto began to exclude supporters like Sarwo Edhie from the running of Indonesia, preferring instead to take the advice of colleagues who had gone up the ranks with him such as Ali Murtopo. Being a New Order radical also did not help His case and like Kemal and Dharsono, Suharto grew suspicious of him.

The final straw came in 1970, when he made allegations of Government corruption in 1970. From that point on, he was given positions that still held stature but kept him away from the politics of the Central Government in Jakarta. He then served as ABRI Academy (AKABRI) Governor (1970–1973), Indonesian Ambassador to South Korea (1973–1978), and Inspector General of the Department of Foreign Affairs (1978–1983).

When Suharto established Pancasila as the National Ideology in 1984, Sarwo Edhie was put in charge of the indoctrination process by being appointed Chairman of the Supervisory Body for Implementation of Guidance for Comprehension and Practice of Pancasila (BP-7). He was elected to the People's Representative Council (DPR) in 1987 and resigned his position in 1988 in protest of Sudharmono's nomination to the Vice Presidency.

== Death ==
He died on 9 November 1989 from chronic high fever. He was buried in his native region Ngupasan, Pangenjurutengah in Purworejo, Central Java. In 2015, he was declared a "national hero" by Indonesia's national government. The announcement was controversial with the Indonesian public given Sarwo's role in the 1965–1967 bloody coup.

== Family and personal life ==
Sarwo Edhie was married to Sunarti Sri Hadiyah, with whom he had seven children. President Susilo Bambang Yudhoyono is his son-in-law, who was married to his daughter Kristiani Ani Herrawati until her death in June 2019.

== Notes ==
Diplomatic posts
Preceded by Benny Moerdani (acting)	Ambassador of Indonesia to South Korea; 1974–1978	Succeeded by Kaharuddin Nasution
Military offices
Preceded by Bintoro	Commander of Kodam XVII/Cenderawasih; 1968–1970	Succeeded by Acub Zainal
Preceded by Sobiran	Commander of Kodam II/Bukit Barisan; 1967–1968	Succeeded by Leo Lopulisa
Preceded by Mung Parhadimulyo	Commander of RPKAD/Puspassus AD; 1964–1967	Succeeded by Widjojo Soejono
