= Robert Elson =

Australian historian

Robert Edward Elson FAHA is a historian, author and academic regarded as an authority on Indonesian history, with his biography of former President Suharto and works on the cultivation system in Colonial Java (the latter frequently being described by Elson himself as "very long and very boring books") considered leading works on their subjects. He also teaches on an undergraduate level about nationalism in the region.

He has taught at the University of Queensland, Brisbane; and at Griffith University.

Elson has many contacts with other leading scholars of his field, including names such as Benedict Anderson and Anthony Reid, as well as with certain political leaders of the region - such as Anwar Ibrahim.

Elson was elected Fellow of the Australian Academy of the Humanities in 1995.

== Selected works ==
- Elson, R E. 2008. The Idea of Indonesia. Cambridge: Cambridge University Press.
- Elson, R E. 2001. Suharto: A Political Biography. Cambridge: Cambridge University Press.
- Elson, R E. 1997. The End of the Peasantry in Southeast Asia: A Social and Economic History of Peasant Livelihood, 1800s-1990s. London: Macmillan.
- Elson, R E. 1994. Village Java under the Cultivation System, 1830-1870. Sydney: Allen & Unwin.
- Elson, R E. 1984. Javanese Peasants and the Colonial Sugar Industry: Impact and Change in an East Java Residency, 1830-1940. Singapore: Oxford University Press.
