= Mochammad Idjon Djanbi =

Dutch-born Indonesian soldier

Mochammad Idjon Djanbi (Rodes Barendrecht Visser)
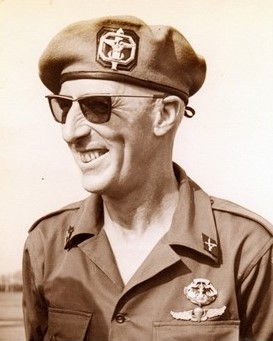
- Mochammad Idjon Djanbi
- Born: Rodes Barendrecht Visser; 13 May 1914; Boskoop, Netherlands
- Died: 1 April 1977 (aged 62); Yogyakarta, Indonesia
- Military career
- Allegiance: Netherlands; (Netherlands) Dutch East Indies; Indonesia
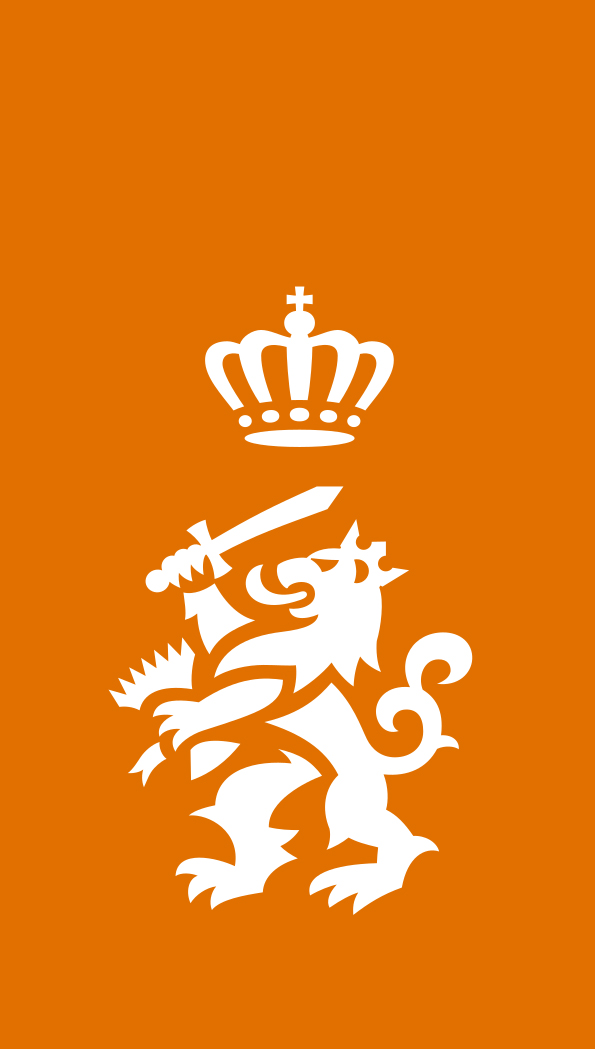
- Branch: Royal Netherlands Army; Royal Netherlands East Indies Army; Indonesian Army
- Service years: 1938–1969
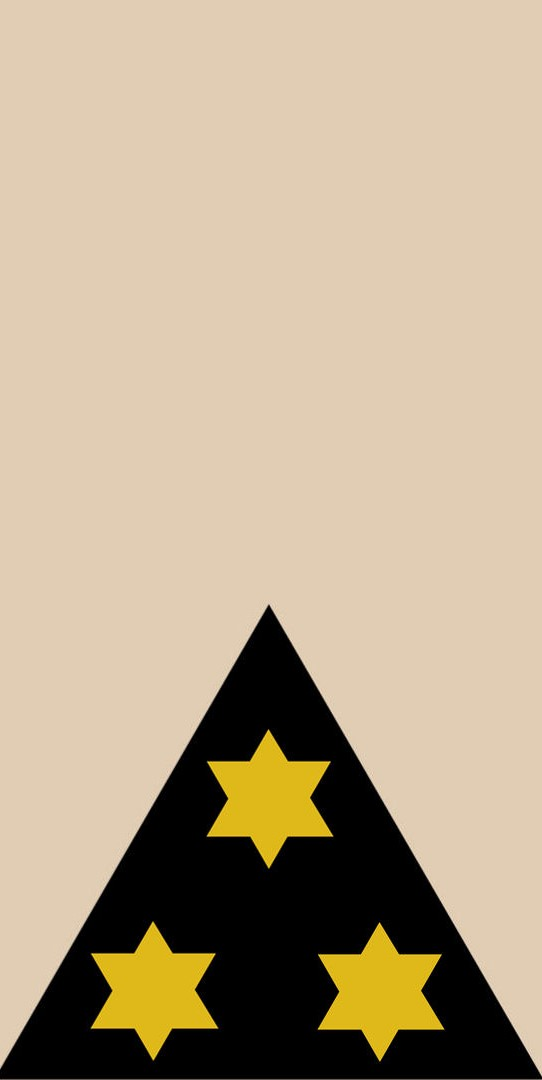
- Rank: Sergeant Royal Netherlands Army (KL); Captain Royal Netherlands East Indies Army (KNIL); Lieutenant colonel Indonesian Army (TNI)
- Units: No. 2 Dutch Troop No. 10 (Inter Allied) Commando(1942–1945); 4th Special Service Brigade Combined Operations Headquarters, War Office, British Government; Korps Speciale Troepen (1945–1949); Kopassus (1952–1969)
- Commands: Kopassus
- Conflicts: World War II; German invasion of the Netherlands; Operation Market Garden; Operation Infatuate; Indonesian National Revolution; South Sulawesi campaign
- Awards: Mobilisation War Cross, War Commemorative Cross, Bronze Cross, Burma Star, World War II Victory Medal, Medal for Order and Peace with ribbon buckles 1946, 1947, 1948, 1949

Lieutenant Colonel (Ret.) Mochammad Idjon Djanbi (13 May 1914 – 1 April 1977) previously known as Rodes Barendrecht "Rokus" Visser, also spelled as Barendregt, was a Dutch-born Indonesian soldier who served as a Dutch commando during World War II, Korps Speciale Troepen officer and eventually became first commander of Kopassus.

== Military career ==
=== Military career during World War II ===
Born the son of a successful Tulip farmer. At the outbreak of World War II in 1939 Visser was drafted into the Dutch army. Visser fought during the German invasion of the Netherlands in May 1940. As a conscript sergeant Visser was assigned to the Dutch Legion in United Kingdom. He volunteered in 1942 to be Radioman in No. 2 Dutch Troop, No. 10 (Inter-Allied) Commando. Along with other allied troops, Visser participated in his first battle in Operation Market Garden, when the unit was incorporated into 82nd Airborne Division. Two weeks later, Visser was reassigned to 101st Airborne Division and landed in Eindhoven. Despite heavy enemy fire, Visser managed to establish a connection with the resistance in Veghel. In the weeks that followed, he took part in the fierce battle in the region. Visser also made himself useful by capturing Germans who wanted to surrender.

On 1 November 1944, Visser was reassigned to Royal Commando and conducted amphibious assault in Walcheren. This unit tried to land on 1 November in Westkapelle in Zeeland. However, the action led to so many losses that the Marines had to withdraw. The next morning another attempt was made, with Visser in charge of a number of landing craft (LCVP). It worked and the marines advanced to Domburg. They went to Veere by vessels for the supply of ammunition and the removal of wounded. This all happened under enemy fire from snipers positioned in trees. Visser was awarded the Bronze Cross for his bravery during these operations.

=== Military Career in Royal Netherlands East Indies Army ===
Visser attended officer school prior to being sent to Asia. In 1945, he rejoined No. 2 Dutch Troop in India and attended a paratrooper school. In Ceylon, he underwent jungle training together with Raymond Westerling intended to join other allied forces in Asia to fight the Japanese forces in Dutch East Indies. However, Japan surrendered before Visser was sent to the Dutch East Indies. Visser was assigned to be an instructor in a Dutch special forces school in India known as School Opleiding Parachutisten /SOP (Paratrooper School). The school was later moved to Jakarta in 1946 and then moved again to Hollandia. During this time he also conducted operations with DST like the South Sulawesi campaign of 1946–1947.

Visser grew to like living in the Dutch East Indies, and asked his wife (a British woman he had married during the war) and his son and daughters to remain with him in the Dutch East Indies. His wife wished to provide a more secure future for her children and she and her family returned to the UK where she opted for divorce. By the time he returned in 1947, the school had already moved to Cimahi, Bandung, and Visser was promoted to captain. During 1947–1949, the paratrooper school led by Captain Visser continued to educate elite paratroopers until Indonesia's independence in 1949. Captain Visser then opted to stay in Indonesia as a civilian, moved to Bandung, worked as a flower farmer in Pacet, Lembang, embraced Islam, married his Sundanese lover and adapted the name Mochammad Idjon Djanbi.

=== Military Career in Indonesian Army ===
On 15 April 1952, Colonel Alexander Evert Kawilarang began to form Kesatuan Komando Tentara Territorium III/Siliwangi (Kesko TT), the early name of Kopassus and the basis for this special forces unit.

Not long after, Kawilarang managed to locate and meet with Visser who had remained a peaceful and law-abiding citizen in the newly independent Indonesia, settled in West Java, married an Indonesian woman, and was known locally as Mochammad Idjon Djanbi. He was the first recruit for the Army special forces and given the rank of major, as well as its first commander. Due to him, the unit which later became Kopassus wear red berets (color used by paratroopers wing Corps of Regiment Speciale Troepen and traditionally favored by airborne troops in Europe) instead of the distinctive green beret.

In 1956, with increasing combat capability of special forces, Army leadership saw opportunity to place the unit under the hands of indigenous officers. Due to lack of tact, this angered Djanbi and caused him to resign his position as commander. Later he was given position at a plantation as a result of the nationalization of a number of foreign-owned plantation. Prior to his retirement in 1969, he was promoted to be lieutenant colonel at the special force anniversary.

== Trivia ==
- He climbed several mountains in Europe and in Indonesia such as the Lawu, Mount Merapi and Bromo.
- He was a grandfather to Indonesian television actor Rizky Djanbi.

== See also ==
- Military Mission for Indonesia

== Bibliography ==
- Conboy, Kenneth J. (2003). Kopassus: Inside Indonesia's Special Forces. Equinox Publishing. ISBN 9789799589880.
