= Operation Trisula =

1968 anti-communist operation in Indonesia

- Part of the Indonesian mass killings of 1965–66
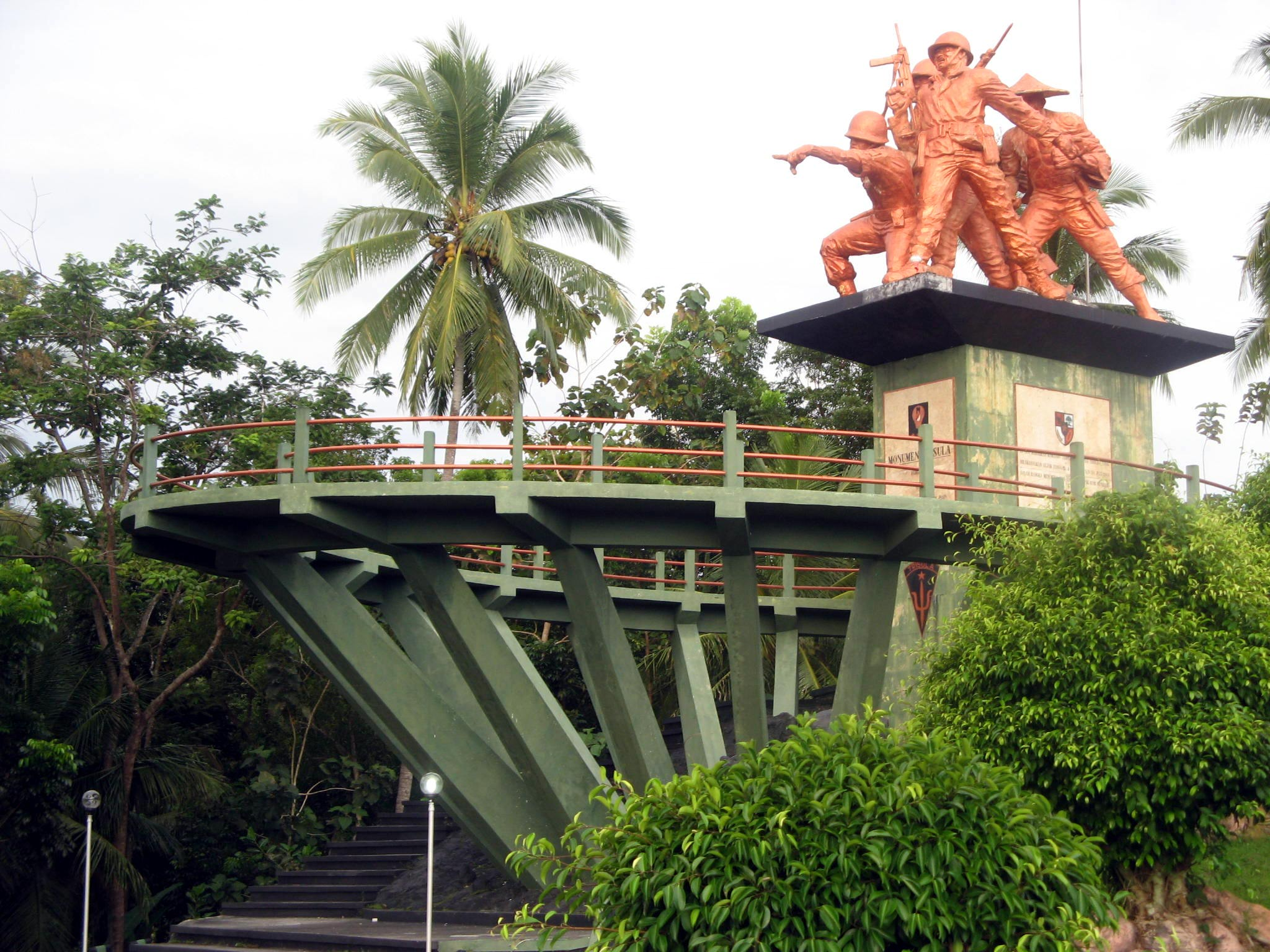
- Trisula Monument in 2010
Date	1 June – 7 September 1968 (3 month, 1 week)
Location	South Blitar, East Java, Indonesia
Result	Indonesian Government victory

Belligerents
Government of Indonesia; ABRI	PKI

Commanders and leaders
Suharto; Abdul Haris Nasution; Witarmin; Kartomo †	Oloan Hutapea †; Sukatno Hoeseni (surrendered)

Strength
5,000 troops Air support : 2 A-26; 3 P-51; 1 C-130; 3 T-6; 4 Mil Mi-4	Unknown

Casualties and losses
18 army personnel killed 2 Police wounded	66 killed 850 captured

Operation Trisula (Indonesian: Operasi Trisula, lit. 'Operation Trident') was an operation carried out by the Indonesian National Armed Forces (ABRI) in order to crush the remnants of the Communist Party of Indonesia (PKI) who had fled to the South Blitar area. The South Blitar area was very strategic as a hiding place for PKI leadership following the 1965-1966 crackdown against the party, because of steep cliffs and hills that are difficult for ground troops to reach. To carry out this operation, the Commander of the VIII/Brawijaya Military Regional Command formed an Operations Task Force Command called the Trisula Task Force on May 25, 1968, with the operational areas of South Blitar, South Malang and Tulungagung.

== Implementation of operation ==
In essence, the Trisula operation area covers the entire East Java region, namely the area of Kodam VIII/Brawijaya, but the plan has changed and is only focused on South Blitar. Through intelligence operations carried out long before Operation Trident, it was discovered that South Blitar was a center for the recovery of the PKI. The PKI had made South Blitar a base area for PKI rebuilding throughout Indonesia. The implementation of Operation Trident was preceded by a shift in troops to designated sectors, the entire operational area was closed starting June 5, 1968. The closure boundaries started in three directions:

- West: Campur Darat, South Tulungagung.
- North: along the Tulungagung highway along the Brantas River to Kalipare, South Blitar.
- East: Kalipare straight south via Sumbermanjing Kulon to the Indian Ocean coastline.

Assistance personnel in closing the operational area involving Hansip, Wanra and the people carrying out village patrols. The purpose of closing it is so that the remaining PKI leadership do not escape from the regional base. Apart from that, it was also hoped that the closure would isolate the Southern region and prevent external assistance from being provided to the PKI in South Blitar. This closure line also functions as a Straggler Line for operational units. The operational area is closed day and night and only a few access corridors have been created, but they remain under strict supervision by officers.

On May 26, 1968, Mayor Inf Soekotjo as Commander of Yonif 531/Para and Mayor Inf Djasripan as Section I Officer of Brigif Linud 18/Trisula conducted an investigation and investigation to obtain the latest information from the operational area. The results of the search were submitted to the Commander of the Trisula Task Force on May 28, 1968, for discussion and as guidance in taking operational action in the field.

With the formation of the SATGAS composition and operational plan, all components for carrying out Operation Trisula have been completed. Kodam VIII/Brawijaya as the executor has full authority to coordinate all regular infantry units in carrying out the main operational tasks. Therefore, in preparation for eradicating the remnants of the PKI in South Blitar, the battalions formed as SATGAS Trisula were battalions under the structural line of Kodam VIII/Brawijaya East Java. Other combat support elements included in the implementing battalion came from the Kostrad and Intel Corps units.

== Trisula Task Force ==
The formation of the Trisula SATGAS was carried out on May 18 1968 at the Staff Hall of Kodam VIII/Brawijaya, Maj Gen M. Jasin who was accompanied by the Commander of the IV Air Area Command and the Commander of the X East Java Police, inaugurated the Trisula SATGAS Command with the structure as following:

- Leadership Elements
  - Commander: Inf Colonel Witarmin
  - Deputy Commander: Lieutenant Colonel Inf B. Sasmito.
  - Chief of Staff: Lieutenant Colonel Inf Soegondho.
- Operation Staff Elements
  - Chief of Staff: Lieutenant Colonel Inf Soegondho.
  - Section I to Section V officers and their deputies.
- Other Staff Elements
  - Intelligence Team for Kodam VIII/Brawijaya Staff
  - Central Army Intelligence Service Combat Intelligence Team.
  - Combat Intelligence Company Brigif Linud 18/Trisula
- Civil Territorial Operations Team under the Leadership of the Blitar Regional Head Regent.
- Combat and Administrative Assistance Elements
  - Headquarters and Headquarters Company.
  - Transportation Team.
  - Military Police Company.
  - Combat Engineer Platoon.
  - Military Police Company.
  - Equipment Team.
  - Transport Team.
  - Information Team.
  - Spiritual Nurturing Team.
  - Quartermaster Team.
  - Team BRDM and Zeni Amphibi.
- Operational and Implementing Elements
  - Infantry Battalion 531/Para.
  - 511th Infantry Battalion.
  - 513th Infantry Battalion.
  - 521st Infantry Battalion.
  - 527th Infantry Battalion.
  - Kodim 0807/Tulungagung.
  - Kodim 0808/Blitar.
  - Kodim 0818/Malang
  - Koramil 0818/10 Pagak.
  - Koramil 0818/11 Donomulyo.
  - Koramil 0818/13 Kalipare.
  - Koramil 0809/9 Sutojayan.
  - Koramil 0808/10 Kademangan.
  - Koramil 0808/11 Binangun.
  - Koramil 0807/6 Rejotangan.
  - Koramil 0807/8 Kalidawir.
- Reinforcement of the Tactical Air Force
  - One Company Command of the Rapid Movement Troops (Kopasgat).
  - One Squadron consists of: 2 helicopters, 2 B-25s, 3 Mustangs, 3 Harvards.
- Units on Alert
  - One Amphibious Combat Engineer Battalion in Pasuruan.
  - One Medan Artillery Battalion in Ngawi.
  - One 401st Infantry Battalion.
  - One Group Kopassus.
