= Wismoyo Arismunandar =

Indonesian army officer (1940–2021)

General Wismoyo Arismunandar
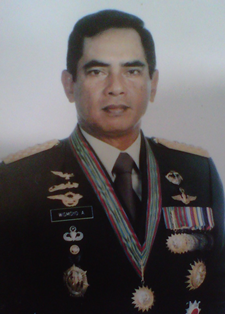
- Born: Wismoyo Arismunandar; 10 February 1940; Bondowoso, Dutch East Indies
- Died: 28 January 2021 (aged 80); Jakarta, Indonesia
- Burial place: Astana Giribangun, Central Java
- Spouse: Siti Hardjanti
- Military career
- Allegiance: Indonesia
- Branch: Army
- Service years: 1963–1995
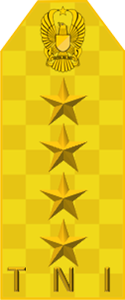
- Rank: General
- Conflicts: Operation Lotus; Insurgency in Aceh; Papua conflict

Wismoyo Arismunandar (10 February 1940 – 28 January 2021) was an Indonesian high-ranking Army officer who served as Chief of Staff of the Army from 1993 to 1995, Commander of Army Strategic Command from 1990 to 1993 and Commander of Kopassus from 1983 to 1986. He was the brother-in-law of Suharto, the second President of Indonesia. His brother, Artono Arismunandar was Director General of Electricity and New Energy (1983–1995). Another brother, Wiranto Arismunandar was rector of Bandung Institute of Technology (1988–1997) and was also Minister of Education and Culture (1998).

He died on 28 January 2021 and was buried in Astana Giribangun.
