= VII Corps =

7th Corps, Seventh Corps, or VII Corps may refer to:

== Germany ==
=== German Empire ===
- VII Corps (German Empire), Imperial German Army, prior to and during World War I
- VII Reserve Corps, Imperial German Army, World War I

=== Nazi Germany ===
- VII Army Corps (Wehrmacht)
- VII Panzer Corps, Wehrmacht
- VII SS Panzer Corps, Waffen-SS

== Russia and Soviet Union ==
=== Russian Empire ===
- 7th Army Corps (Russian Empire)

=== Soviet Union ===
- 7th Assault Aviation Corps
- 7th Guards Cavalry Corps
- 7th Guards Mechanized Corps
- 7th Guards Tank Corps
- 7th Mechanized Corps
- 7th Rifle Corps

== United Kingdom ==
- VII Corps (United Kingdom)

=== Artillery Volunteer Corps ===
- 7th (Aberdeen) Aberdeenshire Artillery Volunteer Corps
- 7th (Port Ellen) Argyllshire Artillery Volunteer Corps
- 7th (Polruan) Cornwall Artillery Volunteer Corps
- 7th (Exmouth) Devonshire Artillery Volunteer Corps
- 7th (Anstruther) Fife Artillery Volunteer Corps
- 7th (Dundee) Forfarshire Artillery Volunteer Corps
- 7th (1st Eastern) Lanarkshire Artillery Volunteer Corps
- 7th (Liverpool) Lancashire Artillery Volunteer Corps
- 7th (Firth) Orkney Artillery Volunteer Corps
- 7th (Batley) Yorkshire (West Riding) Artillery Volunteer Corps
- 7th (Flamborough) Yorkshire (East Riding) Artillery Volunteers

=== Rifle Volunteer Corps ===
- 7th (Cefn) Brecknockshire Rifle Volunteer Corps
- 7th (Conway) Carnarvonshire Rifle Volunteer Corps
- 7th (Chirk) Denbighshire Rifle Volunteer Corps
- 7th (High Peak Rifles of Chapel-en-le-Frith) Derbyshire Rifle Volunteer Corps
- 7th (Cheltenham) Gloucestershire Rifle Volunteer Corps
- 7th (Cowes and Osborne) Isle of Wight Rifle Volunteer Corps
- 7th Kent (Kidbrooke) Rifle Volunteer Corps
- 7th Lanarkshire Rifle Volunteer Corps
- 7th (Lutterworth) Leicestershire Rifle Volunteer Corps
- 7th (Spilsby) Lincolnshire Rifle Volunteer Corps
- 7th (Wellingborough) Northamptonshire Rifle Volunteer Corps
- 7th (Teesdale Volunteers) Yorkshire North Riding Rifle Volunteer Corps
- 7th (Southwark) Surrey Rifle Volunteer Corps
- 7th (Horsham) Sussex Rifle Volunteer Corps
- 7th (Mile End) Tower Hamlets Rifle Volunteer Corps
- 7th (Hull) Yorkshire (East Riding) Rifle Volunteer Corps

== United States ==
- VII Corps (United States), a unit of the United States Army
- VII Corps (Union Army), two separate formations of the Union Army (North) during the American Civil War
- Seventh Army Corps (Spanish–American War), a unit of the United States Army

== Other countries ==
- 7th Corps (Army of the Republic of Bosnia and Herzegovina)
- VII Corps (Finland)
- VII Corps (Grande Armée), Imperial French Army, Napoleonic Wars
- VII Army Corps (Italy)
- VII Corps (North Korea)
- VII Corps (Ottoman Empire)
- VII Maneuver Corps, South Korean Army
- 7th Corps (Turkey)
- 7th Rapid Response Corps, Ukraine
- 7th Aviation Corps, Yugoslavia

== See also ==
- List of military corps by number
- 7th Army (disambiguation)
- 7th Brigade (disambiguation)
- 7th Division (disambiguation)
- 7th Group (disambiguation)
- 7th Regiment (disambiguation)
- 7 Squadron (disambiguation)
