= 7th Division =

7th Division may refer to:

== Infantry units ==
- 7th Division (Australia)
- 7th Infantry Division (Bangladesh)
- 7th Infantry Division (Belgium)
- 7th Rila Infantry Division, Bulgaria
- 7th Canadian Infantry Division
- 7th Division (People's Republic of China)
- 7th Garrison Division of Beijing Military Region
- 7th Division (Continuation War)
- 7th Division (Winter War)
- 7th Infantry Division (France)
- 7th North African Infantry Division
- 7th Division (German Empire)
- 7th Division (Reichswehr)
- 7th Landwehr Division, German Empire
- 7th Luftwaffe Field Division, Germany
- 7th Infantry Division (Wehrmacht), a German unit during World War II
- 7th Mountain Division (Wehrmacht), a German unit during World War II
- 7th Parachute Division, Germany
- 7th Reserve Division, German Empire
- 7th SS Volunteer Mountain Division Prinz Eugen, Nazi Germany
- 7th Infantry Division (Greece)
- 7th (Meerut) Division, of the British Indian Army before and during World War I
- 7th Meerut Divisional Area, of the British Indian Army during World War I
- 7th Indian Infantry Division, of the British Indian Army during World War II
- 7th Division (Iraq)
- 7th CC.NN. Division "Cirene", Italy
- 7th Infantry Division Lupi di Toscana, Kingdom of Italy
- 7th Division (Imperial Japanese Army)
- 7th Division (Japan), of the Japan Ground Self-Defense Force
- 7th Division (Nigeria)
- 7th Division (North Korea)
- 7th Infantry Division (Ottoman Empire)
- 7th Infantry Division (Pakistan)
- 7th Infantry Division (Philippines)
- 7th Infantry Division (Poland)
- 7th Guards Mountain Air Assault Division, Russia
- 7th Infantry Division (Russian Empire)
- 7th Infantry Division (South Korea)
- 7th Division (South Vietnam)
- 7th Guards Rifle Division, Soviet Union
- 7th Mechanized Division (Soviet Union)
- 7th Rifle Division, Soviet Union
- 7th Division (Syrian rebel group)
- 7th Mechanized Division (Syria)
- 7th Infantry Division (Thailand)
- 7th Ukrainian Soviet Division
- 7th Infantry Division (United Kingdom)
- 7th Infantry Division (United States)
- 7th Infantry Division (Vietnam)
- 7th Division (Yugoslav Partisans)

== Cavalry units ==
- 7th Cavalry Division (France) a French military unit during World War I
- 7th Cavalry Division (German Empire)
- 7th Cavalry Division (Russian Empire)

== Armoured units ==
- 7th Armoured Division (France)
- 7th Panzer Division (Wehrmacht), a German unit during World War II
- 7th Panzer Division (Bundeswehr), Germany
- 7th Guards Tank Division, Soviet Union
- 7th Armoured Division (United Kingdom)
- 7th Armored Division (United States)

== Other units ==
- 7th Armed Police Division, China
- 7th Fighter Aviation Division, China
- 7th Military Division (Vichy France)
- 7th Air Division (Germany), a German unit during World War II
- 7th Flak Division, Germany
- 7th Air Division (Japan), of the Imperial Japanese Army
- 7th Guards Rocket Division, Russia/Soviet Union
- 7th Anti-Aircraft Divizion, Ukraine (a battalion-sized unit)
- 7th Anti-Aircraft Division, United Kingdom
- 7th Air Division (United States), United States

== Non-military uses ==
- 7th Division of Xinjiang Production and Construction Corps, China
- Butterfield Overland Mail 7th Division
- Division 7 (Swedish football)
- (various places in Canada)

== See also ==
- Seventh Army (disambiguation)
- 7th Group (disambiguation)
- VII Corps (disambiguation)
- 7th Brigade (disambiguation)
- 7th Regiment (disambiguation)
- 7 Squadron (disambiguation)
