= 7th Infantry =

7th Infantry may refer to:

- 7th Infantry Regiment (disambiguation)
- 7th Infantry Brigade (disambiguation)
- 7th Infantry Division (disambiguation)

== See also ==
- 7th (disambiguation)
