= Seventh Army =

A number of nations have a Seventh Army:

== Germany ==
- 7th Army (German Empire), a World War I field army
- 7th Army (Wehrmacht), a World War II field army

== Russia/Soviet Union ==
- 7th Army (Russian Empire)
- 7th Army (RSFSR)
- 7th Army (Soviet Union)
- 7th Guards Army
- 7th Tank Army

== Others ==
- 7th Army (Austria-Hungary)
- 7th Army (France)
- 7th Army (Italy)
- Seventh Area Army, Japan
- Seventh Army (Ottoman Empire)
- Seventh United States Army
- 7th Army (Kingdom of Yugoslavia)
- Seventh Army (Yugoslavia) (SFRY, 1968-1988)

== See also ==
- List of armies by number
- VII Corps (disambiguation)
- 7th Division (disambiguation)
- 7th Brigade (disambiguation)
- 7th Regiment (disambiguation)
- 7th Squadron (disambiguation)
- 7th Group (disambiguation)
- 7th (disambiguation)
