= 7th Panzer Division =

7th Panzer Division may refer to:

- 7th Panzer Division (Wehrmacht)
- 7th Panzer Division (Bundeswehr)

== See also ==
- 7th Division (disambiguation)
