= Mangaradja Sinaga =

Colonel Mangaradja Sinaga
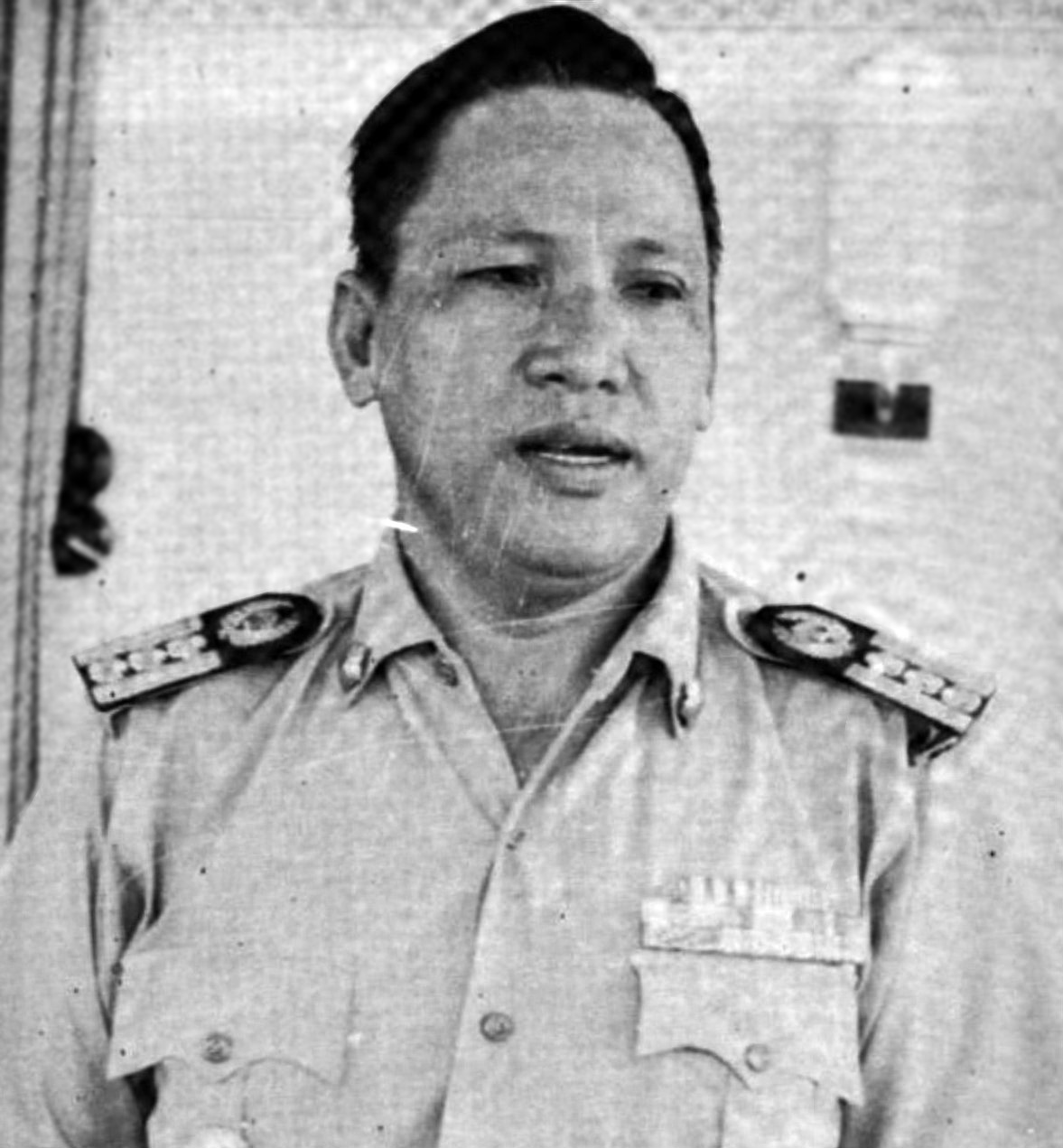

Regent of North Tapanuli
- In office 31 May 1968 – 16 February 1979
- Governor: Marah Halim Harahap; Edward Waldemar Pahala Tambunan
- Preceded by: A.V. Siahaan
- Succeeded by: Salmon Sagala

Personal details
- Born: 1924 Samosir Island, Dutch East Indies
- Died: May 28, 2000 (aged 75-76) Samosir Island, Indonesia
- Spouse: Listeria br. Silalahi (m. 1951)
- Children: Johnny; Leonard; Binsar; Martha; Linda; Diana

Military service
- Allegiance: (Empire of Japan) Giyūgun (1943-45); Indonesian Army (1945-68)
- Branch/service: Army
- Years of service: 1943–1968
- Rank: Colonel
- Battles/wars: Indonesian National Revolution

Colonel Mangaradja Sinta Mardame Sinaga (1924 – 28 May 2000) was a politician and military person who served as the Regent of North Tapanuli from 1968 until 1979. He was the first military person to hold the office.

== Early life ==
Sinaga was born in 1924, at a small community named Sinaga Uruk in the Urat Village, Samosir Sub-District, which at that time was part of the Bataklanden District, Tapanuli Residency, Gouvernenment of Sumatra. He was born as the son of Hiskia Sinaga and Victoria née Samosir.

Sinaga entered the People's School in 1931. He graduated from the school in 1935, and continued his study at the Schakel School (Dutch language school) in the Nainggolan village. He graduated in 1940 and planned to study at the Meer Uitgebreid Lager Onderwijs (Junior High School), but was halted due to the Japanese occupation of the Dutch East Indies.

== Military career ==
In 1943, Sinaga joined the Giyūgun voluntary forces. After the Indonesian independence, he joined the Badan Keamanan Rakyat (People's Security Bureau), which would become the forerunner to the Indonesian National Armed Forces.

Sinaga moved back to Tapanuli in 1946, and became the commander of the Brigade XI of the Sumatran Command, with the rank of second lieutenant. After the recognition of the independence of Indonesia in 1950, he was assigned a post in the Bukit Barisan command as aide-de-camp with the rank of lieutenant colonel. He retained the position until 1966, and from 1966 until 1968, he became the Assistant VI in the command.

== Regent of North Tapanuli ==
=== Election ===
Sinaga nominated himself as the candidate for the Regent of North Tapanuli. He was supported by Golkar, Catholic Party, and the Nahdlatul Ulama fraction inside the Regional People's Representative Council of North Sumatra. Other candidates, such as Daulat Sitorus and Bonar Sitanggang, were supported by the Indonesian Christian Party, while M.U. Situmeang was supported by the IPKI fraction.

Elections were held on 1 February 1968. Sinaga obtained 9 votes, Daulat Sitorus obtained 9 votes, M.U. Situmeang obtained 5 votes, while Bonar Sitanggang obtained 9 votes. Even though there was a tie between Sinaga and Sitorus, the council unanonimously agreed to elect Sinaga as the new regent of North Tapanuli, replacing the acting regent A.V. Siahaan. Sinaga was officially inaugurated as the regent on 31 May 1968.

Prior to the election of a new regent in 1973, Sinaga was inaugurated as the acting regent of North Tapanuli on 7 August 1973. The council unanimously elected Sinaga as the regent of North Tapanuli on 12 December 1973, and he was inaugurated for his second term on 14 February 1974.

=== Infrastructure Development ===
During his first year as the regent of North Tapanuli, Sinaga faced difficult problems regarding to the infrastructure development in the region. According to Sinaga's assessment, the mentality of the people in the region were influenced by "pseudo-ideologies" and caused the government to attach importance to the ideological development rather than infrastructure development. This caused the region to experience extreme poverty and inflations.

Sinaga began his project for the infrastructure development by enacting land acquisition for tourism in Tutuk Siadong, Ajibata and Simanindo. The funds were obtained from the Government of North Sumatra as interest-free loans. Other attempts to increase tourism in the area was by building airports. Sinaga approached the Department of Transportation regarding the plans to build airports in the vicinity of Lake Toba. In 1978, the attempt came to fruition when a small airport was finally constructed in Ajibata, about 10 km from Lake Toba.

Other projects that were constructed during his leadership was the construction of a large reservoir, which began since 1976 in the valley of Sideak-Tanjungan. The reservoirs was planned to be four kilometers long, with a width of 50 meters, and a depth of 20 meters. Even though this project was not finished during his term, Sinaga continued this project even after his resignation from the position.

=== 1971 legislative election ===
During the 1971 Indonesian legislative election, the headquarters of the Indonesian Army predicted that Golkar, the ruling party, would not win in North Tapanuli. The Governor of North Sumatra, Marah Halim Harahap, promised Sinaga a trip to Japan fully covered by Harahap, while the commander of the Bukit Barisan Territory Command, Leo Lopulissa, promised Sinaga a Range Rover Classic. Golkar would win in North Tapanuli by 85%, and Sinaga went on a trip to Japan and got a new Range Rover Classic.

== Family ==
Sinaga was married to Listeria Silalahi in September 1951. The marriage resulted in six children.
