= Amru Daulay =

Indonesian politician (1939–2023)

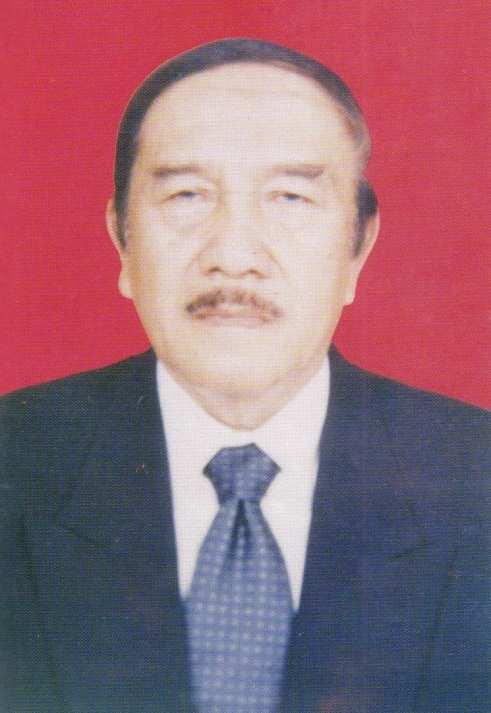

Regent of Mandailing Natal
- In office 9 March 1999^{[a]} – 30 June 2010
- Preceded by: Position established
- Succeeded by: Hidayat Batubara

Personal details
- Born: 18 October 1939 Binjai, Dutch East Indies
- Died: 28 January 2023 (aged 83) Medan, Indonesia
- Party: Golkar
- Education: University of North Sumatra
- a. Acting until 30 June 2000

Amru Helmy Daulay (18 October 1939 – 28 January 2023) was an Indonesian politician. A member of Golkar, he served as regent of Mandailing Natal from 2000 to 2010.

== Early life ==
Amru was born in Binjai on 18 October 1939 as the oldest son of Abdul Halim, a religious figure in North Sumatra, and Sarifah Batubara, Halim's second wife. He spent most of his childhood in the city, finishing elementary school and junior high school in 1951 and 1954, respectively. He then moved to Medan and completed his high school studies there in 1958. Upon finishing high school, Amru attended the law faculty of the University of North Sumatra. He graduated from the university with a law degree in 1963.

== Career ==
Following his graduation, Amru began to teach law at the university. He served as the third deputy dean of the faculty from 1967 until 1969 and as the dean from 1974 until 1977. Five years later, in 1982 Governor Edward Wellington Pahala Tambunan appointed him as the head of BP7, a Pancasila indoctrination institution set up by the government. After serving as the head of BP7, the new governor Kaharuddin Nasution moved Amru to the provincial secretariat and became assistant to the provincial secretary. During his tenure, he briefly held the position of provincial secretary following the appointment of the previous provincial secretary, Alimuddin Simanjuntak, as vice governor.

Amru's influence in the government led to his election as the chairman of North Sumatra's chapter of the Football Association of Indonesia in late 1987. Kaharuddin gave him the permission to assume the position in January 1988. However, less than a year after his election, a corruption case involving players from several football clubs in North Sumatra was uncovered. The case prompted Amru to resign from his position in early 1990.

After several years of serving in the provincial secretariat, Amru was appointed by Governor Raja Inal Siregar as his assistant. Amru was tasked with assisting the governor in governing the Asahan, Labuhanbatu, and Tanjungbalai regency.

On 9 March 1999, the Regency of Mandailing Natal was established as a separate regency from the South Tapanuli Regency. Amru was installed as the acting regent of the region on the same day. He was elected as the definitive regent in 2000 and was reelected in 2005. At the beginning of his second term, Amru was investigated by the police for his involvement in Illegal logging.

Amru retired from the government after the end of his term. He became the chairman of the Al-Ishlahiyah foundation, an education foundation in Binjai. He died on 28 January 2023 at the Colombia Hospital in Medan. Prior to his death, Amru had regularly suffered strokes for four years.

== Personal life ==
Amru was married to Yosma Dalimunthe and has two children. He died in Medan on 28 January 2023, at age 83.
