= 7th Air Division =

7th Air Division may refer to:

- 7th Air Division (Germany)
- 7th Air Division (Japan)
- 7th Air Division (United States)
- 7th Fighter Aviation Division, People's Republic of China

== See also ==
- 7th Division (disambiguation)
