= Salmon Sagala =

Toba Bataknese politician and bureaucrat (1931-2001)

Drs. Salmon Sagala
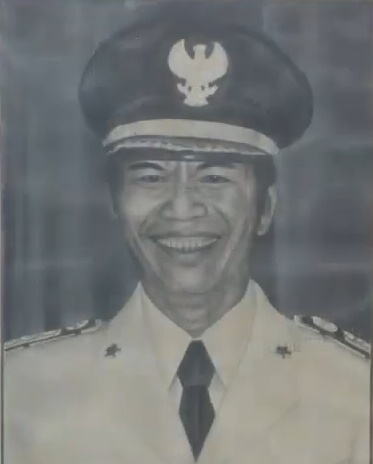

Regent of North Tapanuli
- In office 16 February 1979 – 16 February 1984
- Governor: Edward Waldemar Pahala Tambunan; Kaharuddin Nasution
- Preceded by: Mangaradja Sinaga
- Succeeded by: Gustav Sinaga

Personal details
- Born: 14 April 1931 Sagala, Sianjur Mulamula, Samosir Island, Dutch East Indies
- Died: 18 July 2001 (aged 70) Medan, North Sumatra, Indonesia
- Spouse: Ellen br. Samosir (m. 1957)
- Children: Septiana; Otto Dwana; Yanhans Tumbaksyah; Yandick Tumio; Julieta Sagala; Nowiti Sagala

Drs. Salmon Sagala (14 April 1931 – 18 July 2001) was a Toba Bataknese politician and bureaucrat person who served as the Regent of North Tapanuli from 1979 until 1984.

== Early life ==
Sagala was born on 14 April 1931 in a small village named Sagala in Samosir Island, as the son of Elias Sagala and Buntulan (née Simbolon). He was the second child out of his seven brothers and sisters.

He went to study at the Volksschool (People's School) in the Sagala village, and continued his studies at the Junior High School in Pangururan. After graduating, he continued to study at the High School, where he frequently move from one high school to another in Muara, Tarutung, and Balige. Finishing his high school, he continued his studies at the Employee Service Course C, and continued studying at the Academy for Internal Affairs (APDN), graduating from the latter in 1958.

== Career ==
Sagala began his career as an employee in the office of the Regent of Simalungun and the office of the Chief of Subdistrict in Padang, Tebingtinggi. In 1962, he was appointed as the Camat of Patumbak. He paused his career for a while, and went to the Gajah Mada University, graduating from the university in 1964.

After he graduated, he was appointed as the head of the education bureau in the office of the Governor of North Sumatra. In 1966, he was appointed as the director of the Academy for Internal Affairs. Since then, he was appointed as the Head of the Security Directorate of North Sumatra, acting regent of Simalungun, head of the government bureau in the office of the Governor of North Sumatra, and as the first assistant to the Regional Secretary of North Sumatra. After that he was nominated as the Regent of North Tapanuli, and won the election.

== As the Regent of North Tapanuli ==
Sagala was inaugurated as the Regent of North Tapanuli on 16 February 1979. He replaced the previous regent, Mangaradja Sinaga, who had served two terms as a regent.

=== Mutual Assistance ===
After his inauguration as the Regent of North Tapanuli, Sagala faced several problems in North Tapanuli, such as the lack of penetration of regional funds for isolated areas, land acquisition for public works, and the lack of heavy equipments for large-scale projects.

To cope this problem, Sagala encouraged mutual assistance of the North Tapanuli populace. The Government of North Tapanuli cooperated with the army to build roads and easing access to isolated villages. One of the highlights of the mutual assistance movement in North Tapanuli is the construction of the Tarabintang - Siantar Sitanduk road in the Parlilitan Subdistrict and the opening of the Hutajulu road in the Parmonangan subdistricts.

=== Third Five-Year Plan ===
During his term, The Third Five-Year Plan in North Tapanuli was enacted. The Third Five-Year Plan was focused on the increase of agricultural output and maintaining the rice production level that had been achieved during the previous Five-Year Plan. The plan succeeded, as the rice production level in North Tapanuli rise by 2.44% every year during his term. According to Sagala, the plan achieved due to the increased area of intensification, special intensification to the Operation Prosperous Village, and the increasing public awareness of improving agricultural performance for economic improvement.

Sagala also planned to increase the economic growth of North Tapanuli. He estimated that at the end of his term, the economy of North Tapanuli would rise by 7%. The target was fulfilled with an economic growth of 7.6%.

=== Development Areas of North Tapanuli ===
In accordance with the Decree of the Minister of Internal Affairs, on 16 May 1983, Sagala divided the regency into five different development areas. The areas consisted of several subdistricts. The development areas became the base for enacting economic, socio-cultural, and government policies. These development areas was also used for tourism development strategy in nine priority regions, namely Ajibata, Porsea, Balige, Tuktuk Siadong, Siborongborong, Dolok Sanggul, Tarutung, Lumbanjulu, and Lagundi.

== Death ==
Sagala died on 18 July 2001 at his house in Gelas Street 29, Medan. Previously, Sagala was treated intensively for his disease at the Elizabeth Hospital in Medan.

== Family ==
He was married to Ellen née Samosir on 11 August 1957. The marriage resulted in three sons and three daughters.
