= Korem 033/Wira Pratama =

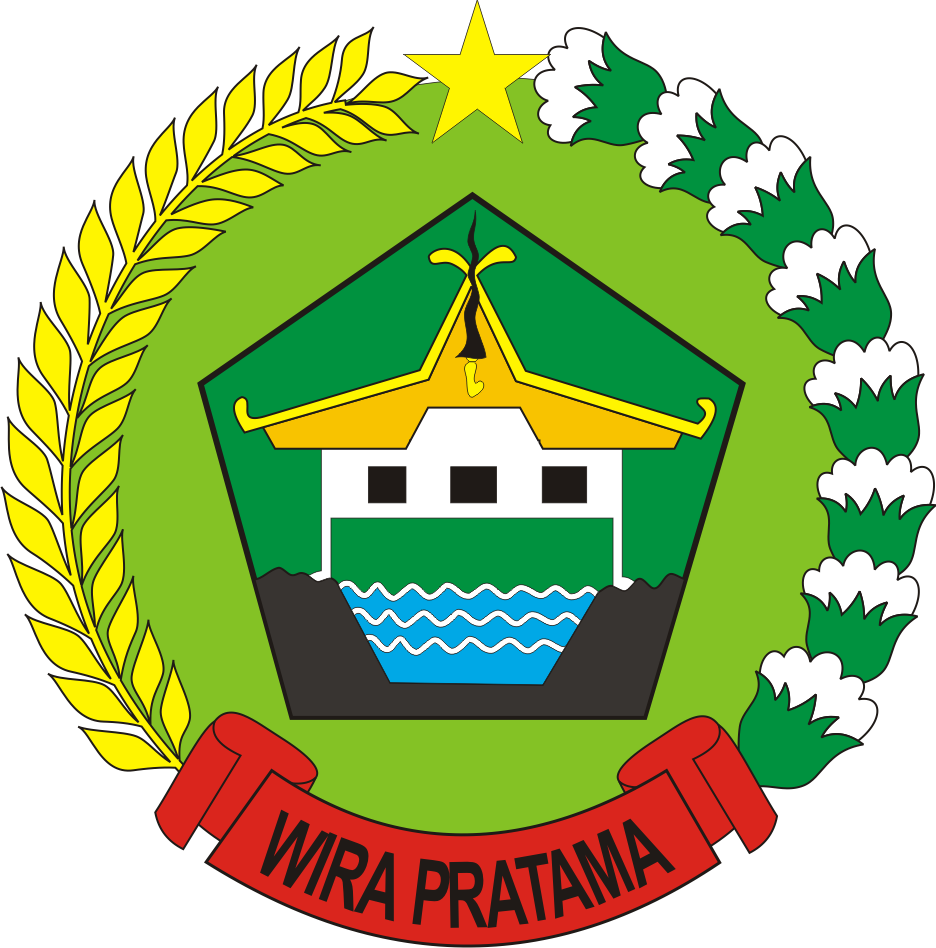
- Insignia of Korem 033/Wira Pratama
- Active: 10 July 2006 - Present
- Country: Indonesia
- Branch: Kodam I/Bukit Barisan
- Type: Military Area Command (KOREM)
- Garrison/HQ: Tanjung Pinang, Bintan Island, Kepri
- Motto: "Wira Pratama"

Korem 033/Wira Pratama, or Military Area Command 033rd/Wira Pratama is a Military Area Command (Korem) under Kodam I/Bukit Barisan. Its garrison is located on Tanjung Pinang city, Bintan Island, Kepri. It consist of four Military District Commands (Kodim) divided into 34 Military District Command Sectors (Koramil) and one infantry battalion.

== Units ==
- Kodim 0315/Bintan
- Kodim 0316/Batam
- Kodim 0317/Tanjung Balai Karimun
- Kodim 0318/Natuna
- 136th Raider Infantry Battalion/Tuah Sakti
