= 7th Mechanized Division =

7th Mechanized Division may refer to:

- 7th Mechanized Division (Soviet Union)
- 7th Mechanized Division (Syria)

== See also ==
- 7th Division (disambiguation)
