= 7th Armoured Brigade =

7th Armoured Brigade or 7th Armored Brigade may refer to:

- 7th Armored Brigade (People's Republic of China)
- 7th Armoured Brigade (France)
- 7th Armored Brigade (Israel)
- 7th Armoured Brigade (United Kingdom)

== See also ==
- 7th Armored (disambiguation)
- 7th Brigade (disambiguation)
