= 7th Marine Brigade =

7th Marine Brigade may refer to:

- 7th Marine Brigade (Mexican Marine Corps)
- 7th Marine Brigade (Philippines Marine Corps)
- 7th Marine Brigade (PLA Navy Marine Corps)
- 7th Marine Brigade (Republic of Korea Marine Corps)

== See also ==
- 7th Marines
- 7th Brigade
