= Gustav Sinaga =

Simalungun politician and bureaucrat (1939–1991)

Drs. Gustav Sinaga
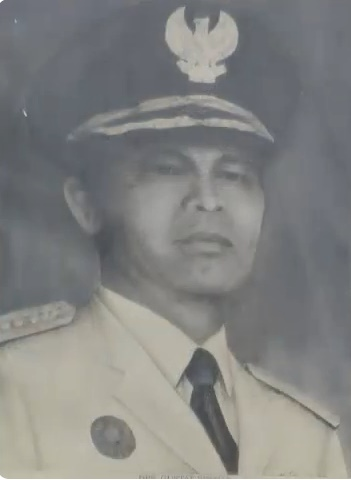

Regent of North Tapanuli
- In office 16 February 1984 – 16 February 1989
- Governor: Kaharuddin Nasution; Raja Inal Siregar
- Preceded by: Salmon Sagala
- Succeeded by: Lundu Panjaitan

Personal details
- Born: 23 September 1939 Tanah Jawa, Simalungun, Dutch East Indies
- Died: 29 October 1991 (aged 52) Medan, North Sumatra, Indonesia
- Spouse: Astillia Pardede (m. 1963)
- Children: Justina Mariana; Henrad Ronald; Honer Bochem; Hestina Sinaga

Drs. Gustav Sinaga (23 September 1939 – 29 October 1991) was a Simalungun politician and bureaucrat person who served as the Regent of North Tapanuli from 1984 until 1989.

== Early life ==
Sinaga was born on 23 September 1939 at Tanah Jawa, Simalungun. He went to study at the Tanah Jawa elementary school in 1945, and continued to study at the Junior High School and High School in Pematangsiantar. He continued to study at the Gajah Mada University, and graduated in 1960.

== Career ==
Sinaga began his career as an employee for financial and administration affairs in the office of the Governor of North Sumatra. In 1967, he became the Junior Superintendent in the Financial Bureau, and he became Superintendent in the Financial Bureau four years later. On 1 April 1977, he was appointed as the head of the Bureau, and in 1982, he became an assistant to the Regional Secretary of North Sumatra.

== As the Regent of North Tapanuli ==
Sinaga was inaugurated as the Regent of North Tapanuli on 16 February 1984. He replaced the previous regent, Salmon Sagala.

=== Infrastructure Development ===
During his term, Sinaga began to attract investment into North Tapanuli. Since June 1988, various national companies such as pulp factories, tea plantations, kaolinite mine, and mica mine, began to operate in North Tapanuli.

== Later life and death ==
After his term as the Regent of North Sumatra had expired, he was reappointed to his previous position, the Assistant to the Regional Secretariat of North Sumatra. He died on 29 October 1991 after attending the inauguration for the new office of the Government Tourism Bureau in Pancing Street, Medan.

== Family ==
He was married to Astillia Pardede on 23 September 1963. The marriage resulted in two sons and two daughters.
