= 7th Group =

In military terms, 7th Group may refer to:

- 7th Operations Group (U.S. Air Force)
- 7th Support Group (United Kingdom)
- 7th Special Forces Group (United States)
- 7th Psychological Operations Group
- 7th Carrier Air Group (UK Fleet Air Arm)

== See also ==
- 7th Division (disambiguation)
- 7th Brigade (disambiguation)
- 7th Regiment (disambiguation)
- 7th Squadron (disambiguation)
