= Zhangjiakou Ningyuan Airport =

Airport in Hebei, north China

Zhangjiakou Ningyuan Airport 张家口宁远机场
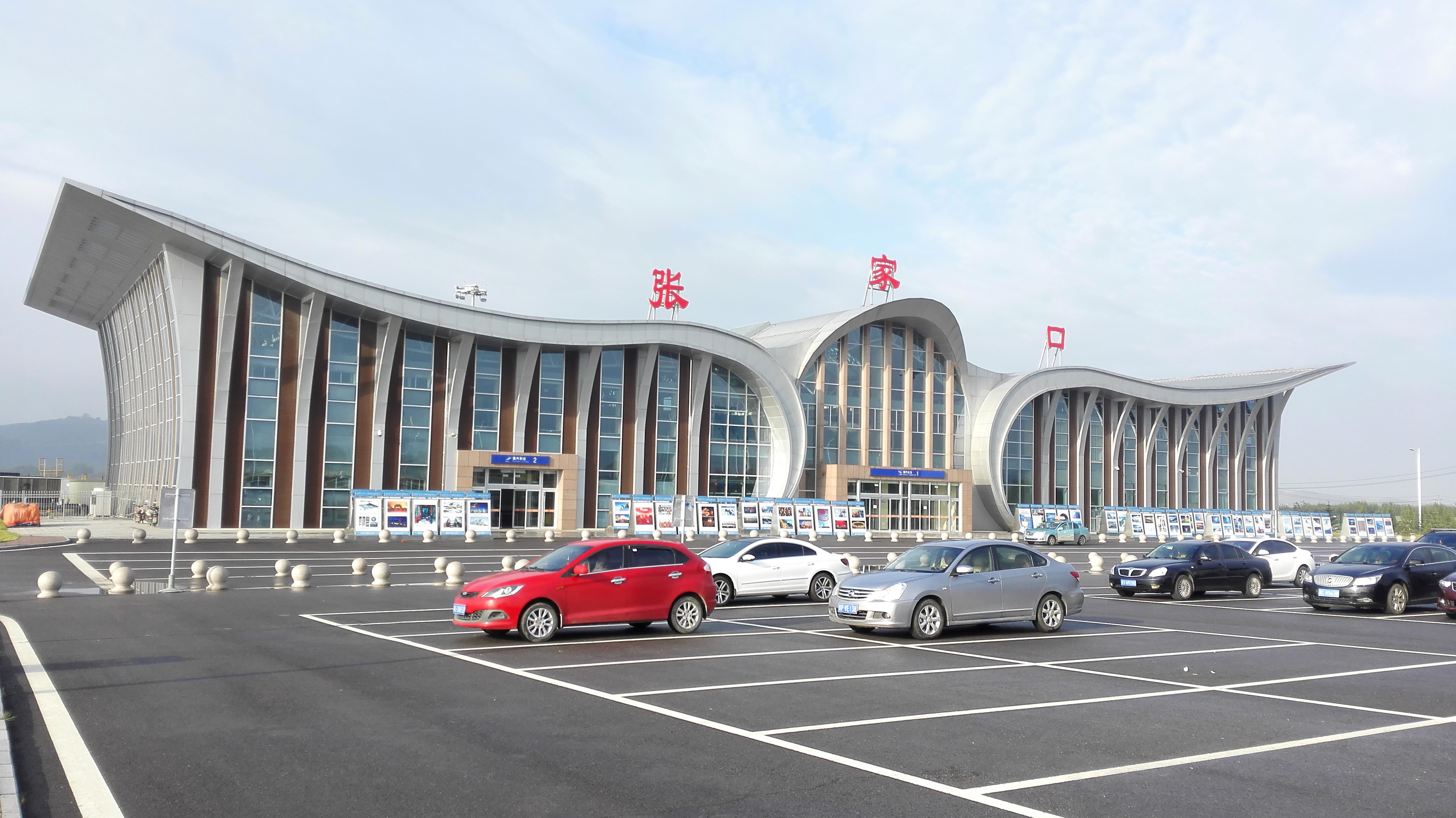
- IATA: ZQZ; ICAO: ZBZJ

Summary
- Airport type: Public / Military
- Serves: Zhangjiakou, Hebei, China
- Opened: 16 June 2013; 13 years ago
- Coordinates: 40°44′19″N 114°55′49″E

Map
- Location of airport in Hebei

Runways
Direction	Length		Surface
Direction	m	ft	Surface
12/30	2,500	8,202	Concrete

Statistics (2021)
- Passengers: 464,638
- Aircraft movements: 4,617
- Cargo (metric tons): 39.4

Zhangjiakou Ningyuan Airport
- Simplified Chinese: 张家口宁远机场
- Traditional Chinese: 張家口寧遠機場
Transcriptions
Standard Mandarin
- Hanyu Pinyin: Zhāngjiākǒu Níngyuǎn Jīchǎng

Zhangjiakou Ningyuan Airport (IATA: ZQZ, ICAO: ZBZJ) is a dual-use military and public airport serving the city of Zhangjiakou in Hebei province, north China. It is located 9 kilometers southeast of the city center. Construction to convert the air base to a dual-use airport began in May 2010 at an estimated cost of 450 million yuan. The airport was opened on 16 June 2013.

== Facilities ==
The airport has a runway that is 2,500 meters long and 45 meters wide (class 4C). It is capable of handling 200,000 passengers and 900 tons of cargo annually.

== Military use ==
The Airport is home to the 7th Fighter Aviation Division which operates J-7 and J-11 fighter aircraft.

== Airlines and destinations ==
Airlines	Destinations
China Express Airlines	Shijiazhuang
Hebei Airlines	Hangzhou, Shijiazhuang
Spring Airlines	Shanghai–Hongqiao, Shijiazhuang

== See also ==
- List of airports in China
- List of the busiest airports in China
- List of People's Liberation Army Air Force airbases
