= 7th Landwehr Division =

7th Landwehr Division (7. Landwehr-Division)
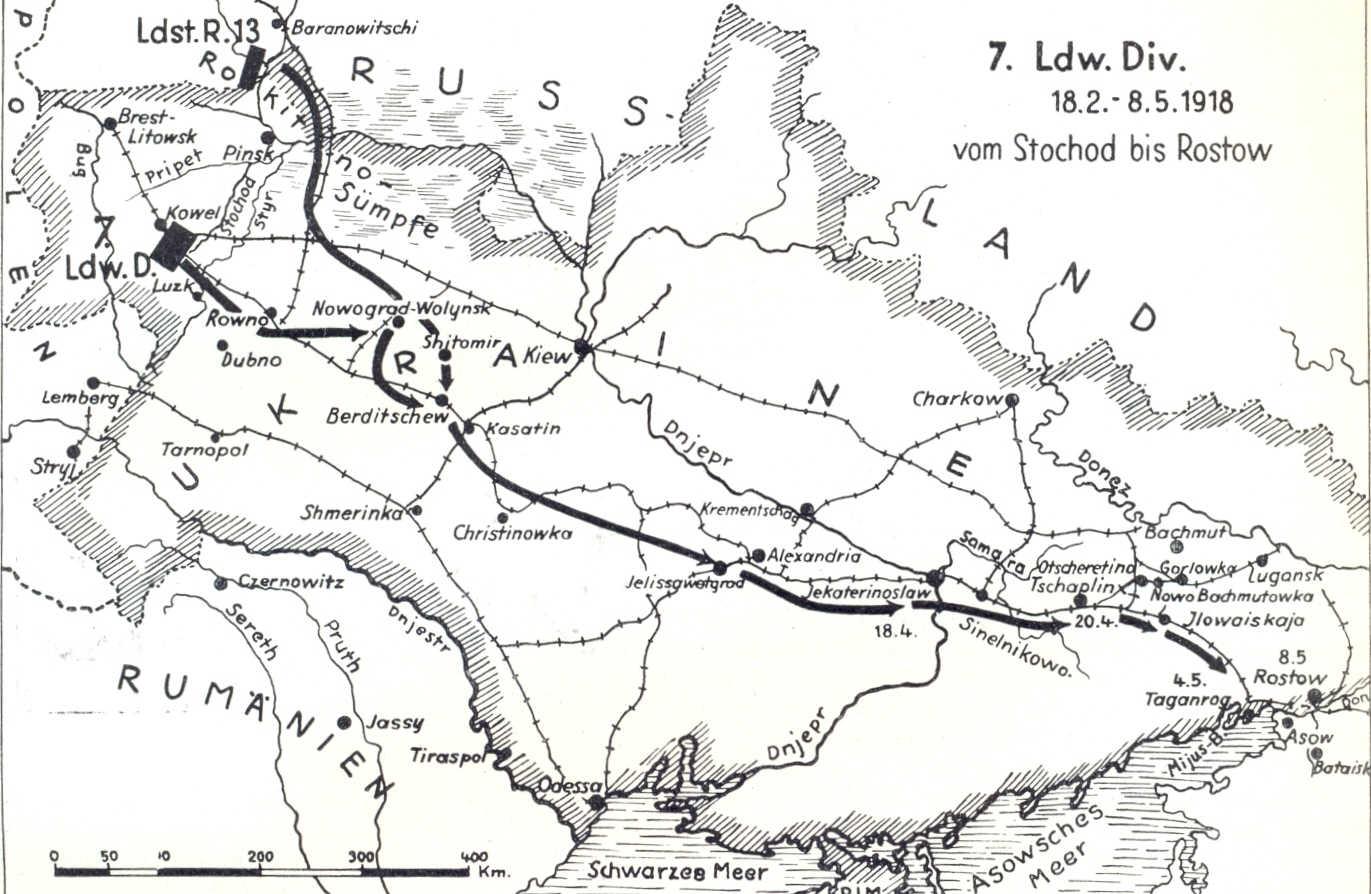
- Active: 1915-1919
- Country: Württemberg/Germany
- Branch: Army
- Type: Infantry
- Size: Approx. 12,500
- Engagements: World War I

The 7th Landwehr Division (7. Landwehr-Division) was a unit of the Prussian/German Army. The division was formed on January 27, 1915, out of two formerly Mixed Landwehr Brigades (55th and the 57th). The division spent the period from its formation to early 1917 on the Western Front, mainly involved in positional warfare in Upper Alsace, after which it went to the Lorraine front. It was transferred to the Eastern Front in the Spring of 1917, where it remained after the 1917 armistice on that front. In 1918, it served on internal security missions in Ukraine, where it was located when World War I ended. Allied intelligence rated the division as a fourth class division. The division was disbanded in 1919, during the demobilization of the German Army after World War I.

The 7th Landwehr Division, like the 55th and 57th Brigades before it, was raised in the Kingdom of Württemberg. As a Landwehr division, it was primarily composed of older soldiers who had already fulfilled their regular and reserve service obligations.

== Order of battle on April 1, 1915 ==
The order of battle of the division on April 1, 1915, shortly after its formation, was as follows:

- 51. Landwehr-Infanterie-Brigade:
  - Kgl. Württembergisches Landwehr-Infanterie-Regiment Nr. 119
  - Kgl. Württembergisches Landwehr-Infanterie-Regiment Nr. 123
- Radfahrer-Kompanie Nr. 1
- 52. Landwehr-Infanterie-Brigade:
  - Kgl. Württembergisches Landwehr-Infanterie-Regiment Nr. 121
  - Kgl. Württembergisches Landwehr-Infanterie-Regiment Nr. 126
- Kgl. Württembergische Gebirgs-Kompanie
- 1. Landwehr-Eskadron/XIII. (kgl. württ.) Armeekorps
- 2. Landwehr-Eskadron/XIII. (kgl. württ.) Armeekorps
- Kgl. Württembergisches Landwehr-Feldartillerie-Regiment Nr. 1
- 2. Landwehr-Pionier-Kompanie/XIII. (kgl. württ.) Armeekorps
- 3. Landwehr-Pionier-Kompanie/XIII. (kgl. württ.) Armeekorps

== Order of battle on May 8, 1919 ==
Divisions underwent many changes during the war, with regiments moving from division to division, and some being destroyed and rebuilt. The 7th Landwehr Division was triangularized in January 1917, losing the 51st Landwehr Infantry Brigade headquarters and the division's fourth infantry regiment. Other units were swapped out or transferred to other divisions. An artillery command and a divisional signals command were created. The 7th Landwehr Division's order of battle on May 8, 1918, was as follows:

- 52. Landwehr-Infanterie-Brigade
  - Kgl. Württembergisches Reserve-Infanterie-Regiment Nr. 122
  - Kgl. Württembergisches Landwehr-Infanterie-Regiment Nr. 121
  - Kgl. Württembergisches Landwehr-Infanterie-Regiment Nr. 126
  - Kgl. Württembergische Gebirgs-Kompanie
- 1. Eskadron/Ulanen-Regiment König Wilhelm I (2. Württembergisches) Nr. 20
- Artillerie-Kommandeur 149 (from February 16, 1917)
  - Kgl. Württembergisches Landwehr-Feldartillerie-Regiment Nr. 1
- Stab Pionier-Bataillon Nr. 407
  - 2. Landwehr-Pionier-Kompanie/XIII. (kgl. württ.) Armeekorps
  - Minenwerfer-Kompanie Nr. 307
- Divisions-Nachrichten-Kommandeur 507 (from September 12, 1917)
