= 7th Rifle Division =

- Battle flag of the 7th Estonian Rifle Division
- Active: I Formation: 1918–1941 II Formation: 1941–1945
- Country: Soviet Union
- Branch: Red Army
- Type: Infantry
- Size: Division
- Engagements: Russian Civil War: Perm Operation (1918–19); Soviet invasion of Poland; Winter War; World War II: Battle of Kiev (1941); Battle for Velikiye Luki; Baltic Offensive; Courland Pocket
- Decorations: Order of the Red Banner (2; 1st formation) (1; 2nd formation) Order of the Red Banner of Labour (1st formation)
- Battle honours: Chernigov (1st formation) In the name of Frunze (1st formation) Tallinn (2nd formation)

Commanders
- Notable commanders: Ivan Sovetnikov

The 7th Rifle Division was an infantry division of the Soviet Union's Red Army, formed twice.

== History ==
The division was first formed in September 1918 at Vladimir in the Moscow Military District.

After reorganisation, probably as part of forming new divisions, the division was re-formed for the second time in August 1939 at Poltava in the Kiev Special Military District. In September–October, 1939 the division took part in the Soviet invasion of Poland (1939) as part of the 6th Rifle Corps, 6th Army, Ukrainian Front. From the Kiev Special MD it was sent to Finland around the middle of January 1940 during the Soviet invasion in Finland. The division arrived in Perkjärvi around the end of January or the start of February and moved to lake Mikkilänjärvi. From 3 February 1940 it joined the 50th Rifle Corps, and advanced with the Corps from 13.02.1940 as part of the 7th Army. It was then shifted to the 10th Rifle Corps about 20 February 1940, on the Summa-Hotinen direction. It was then shifted again, to the 34th Rifle Corps in February–March and awarded the Order of the Red Banner.

Returned to the Kiev Special Military District in April 1940, it participated in the Soviet occupation of Bessarabia and Northern Bukovina in June–July 1940. In August 1940 it was reformed as the 7th Motorized Division. During the Soviet-Finnish campaign the division consisted of the 27th, 257th, and 300th Rifle Regiments, the 23rd Reconnaissance Battalion, and the 405th Separate Tank Battalion. Fighting as part of the 8th Mechanized Corps, 26th Army, Southwestern Front, from June 1941, the division was decimated in attempting to halt the German advance. It was engaged in the Lutsk-Rovno area soon after the German invasion began.

The division was reformed on 27 December 1941 for the third time from remnants of the 22nd Estonian Territorial Rifle Corps. It was reformed at Sverdlovsk in the Ural MD in 1942, as an Estonian national formation, which later joined the 8th Estonian Rifle Corps of the Red Army. It took part in operations from 7 November 1942 as part of the 3rd, 1st Shock, 8th and 42nd Armies. Its first combat was the Battle of Velikiye Luki. On 1 December 1942 it was part of the 8th Rifle Corps, subordinated directly to the Kalinin Front alongside other Estonian formations. On 22 September 1944 elements of the division, along with the 45th Estonian Tank Regiment and the 952nd SU Regiment (SU-76s), formed the forward detachment of 8th Rifle Corps and captured Tallinn, for which all three units received the name of that city as a battle honor. The 7th Estonian Rifle Division was with 1st Shock Army of the Kurland Group (Leningrad Front) in May 1945. On 28.06.1945 it became the 118th Guards Rifle Division by NKO Order No. 0126.

Feskov et al. 2013 does not, despite earlier publications, list the division among those reformed in the 1950s.

== Honorifics and awards ==
- 22.10.1944 Awarded the honorific "Tallinn"
- 16.12.1944 Awarded the Order of the Red Banner

== See also ==
- List of Soviet Union divisions 1917–1945

== Notes ==
- Feskov, V.I.; Golikov, V.I.; Kalashnikov, K.A.; Slugin, S.A. (2013). Вооруженные силы СССР после Второй Мировой войны: от Красной Армии к Советской [The Armed Forces of the USSR after World War II: From the Red Army to the Soviet: Part 1 Land Forces] (in Russian). Tomsk: Scientific and Technical Literature Publishing. ISBN 9785895035306.
