= 7th CC.NN. Division "Cirene" =

- 7ª Divisione CC.NN. "Cirene"
- 7th CC.NN. Division "Cirene" insignia
- Active: 27 April 1936 – 15 September 1936
- Country: Kingdom of Italy
- Branch: Blackshirts
- Role: Garrison; Construction
- Size: Division
- Patron: Cyrene
- Engagements: Second Italo-Ethiopian War

Commanders
- Notable commanders: Lieutenant General Guido Scandolara

The 7th CC.NN. Division "Cirene" (Italian: 7ª Divisione CC.NN. "Cirene") was an Italian CC.NN. (Blackshirts militia) division raised on 27 April 1936 for the Second Italo-Ethiopian War against Ethiopia and disbanded on 15 September 1936 after the war's end. The name "Cirene" was chosen to commemorate the Roman city of Cyrene (Italian: Cirene) located in the Cyrenaica, where the division was deployed. The division's commander was Lieutenant General Guido Scandolara. The division was deployed in Libya during the war against Abyssinia to threaten the Suez Canal should the British close it to Italian traffic. It was never deployed to Abyssinia, but was considered to take part in the campaign. It actually acted as a local garrison and engaged in various construction projects.

== Organization ==
Below follows the division's organization during the Second Italo-Ethiopian War and the cities, in which its CC.NN. battalions and companies/batteries were raised.

- 7th CC.NN. Division "Cirene"
  - 190th CC.NN. Legion "Pisa", in Pisa
    - Command Company
    - CXC CC.NN. Battalion
    - CCCXLI CC.NN. Battalion, in Caserta
  - 196th CC.NN. Legion "Petrarca", in Arezzo
    - Command Company
    - CXCVI CC.NN. Battalion, in Arezzo
    - CCXLV CC.NN. Battalion, in Castellammare di Stabia
  - 198th CC.NN. Legion "Maremma", in Grosseto
    - Command Company
    - CXCVIII CC.NN. Battalion, in Grosseto
    - CCXL CC.NN. Battalion, in Salerno
  - 219th CC.NN. Legion "Ricciotti", in Frosinone
    - Command Company
    - CCXIX CC.NN. Battalion, in Frosinone
    - CCXLIV CC.NN. Battalion, in Avellino
  - 241st CC.NN. Legion "Volturno", in Caserta
    - Command Company
    - CCVII CC.NN. Battalion, in Zadar
    - CCXLI CC.NN. Battalion, in Caserta
  - 267th CC.NN. Legion "Etna", in Catania
    - Command Company
    - CCXLVIII CC.NN. Battalion, in Foggia
    - CCLXVII CC.NN. Battalion, in Catania
  - 271st CC.NN. Legion "Vespri", in Palermo
    - Command Company
    - CCLXXI CC.NN. Battalion, in Palermo
    - CCLXXVI CC.NN. Battalion, in Cagliari
  - 352nd CC.NN. Legion "Acciaiata", in Lecce
    - Command Company
    - CCCLII CC.NN. Battalion, in Lecce
    - CCCLXIII CC.NN. Battalion, in Reggio Calabria
  - 7th Motorized Artillery Regiment (Royal Italian Army)
    - Command Unit
    - 3x Artillery groups
    - Ammunition and Supply Unit
  - VII Mixed Transport Unit (Royal Italian Army)
  - VII Supply Unit (Royal Italian Army)
  - 2x CC.NN. replacement battalions
  - 180th CC.NN. Machine Gun Company
  - 180th CC.NN. Artillery Battery (65/17 infantry support guns)
  - 4th Artillery Battery (65/17 infantry support guns, Royal Italian Army)
  - 7th Special Engineer Company (Royal Italian Army)
  - 7th Medical Section (Royal Italian Army)
  - 7th Logistic Section (Royal Italian Army)
  - 7th Carabinieri Section

== Sources ==
- Ettore Lucas and Giorgio de Vecchi, "Storia delle Unità Combattenti della MVSN 1923-1943", Giovanni Volpe Editore, 1976. pages 63 to 116 plus errata.
