= 7th Space Warning Squadron =

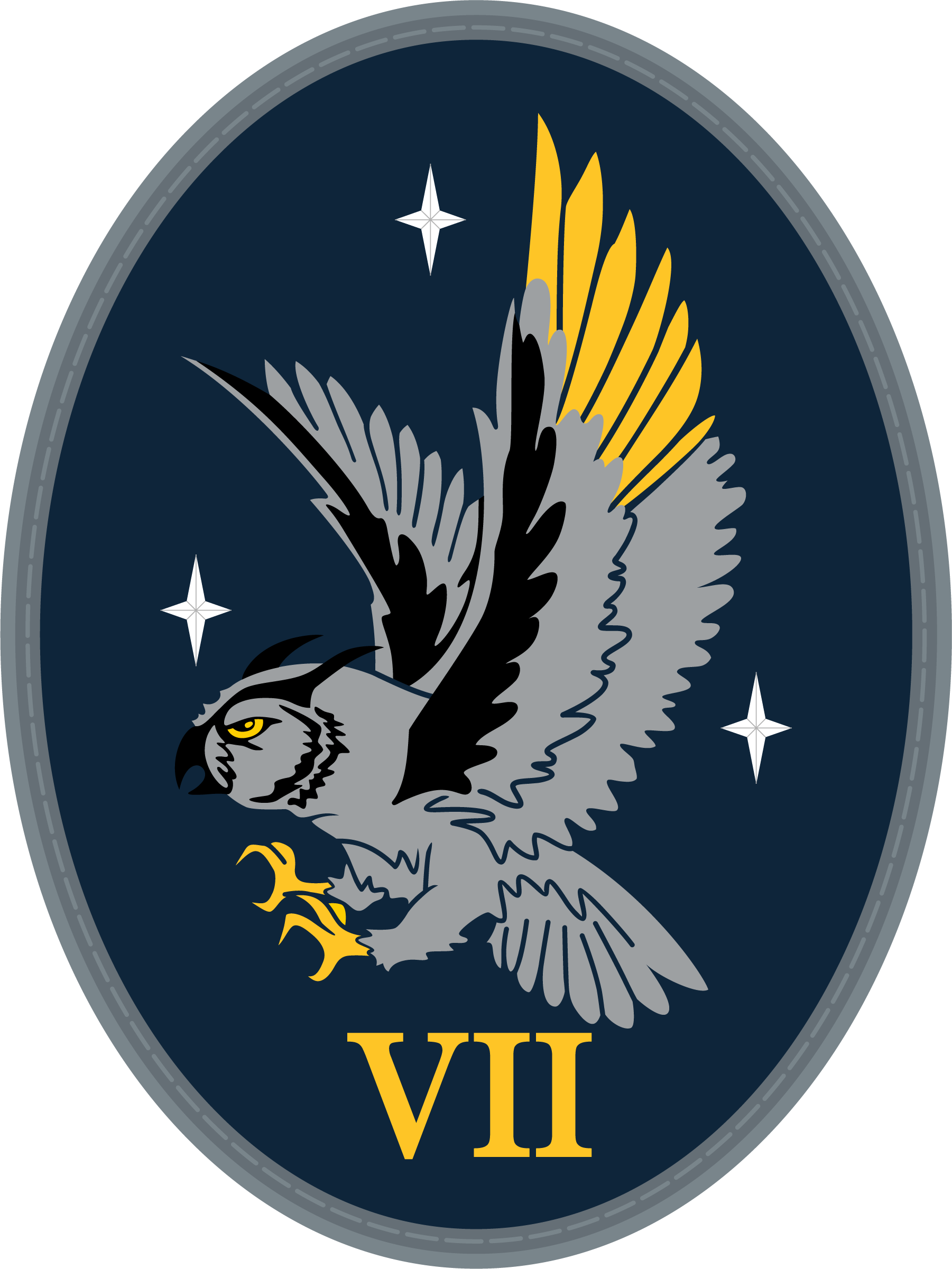
- 7 SWS emblem
- Active: 1979–present
- Country: United States
- Branch: United States Space Force
- Role: Missile warning
- Part of: Mission Delta 4
- Garrison/HQ: Beale Air Force Base, California
- Nickname: Bandits
- Decorations: AFOUA

Commanders
- Current commander: Lt Col Bahia Cromwell

Insignia
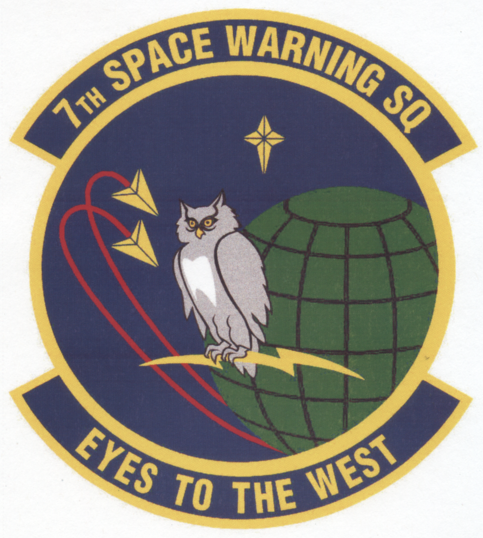
- 7th Space Warning Squadron (in use until transfer to the Space Force)

The 7th Space Warning Squadron (7 SWS) is the premier Space Domain Awareness sensor on the West Coast of the United States. The unit, located on the elevated, eastern extreme of Beale Air Force Base, approximately 8 miles (13 km) east of Marysville, California, was originally established in the context of the U.S.-Soviet Cold War to guard the U.S. West Coast against sea-launched ballistic missiles. 7 SWS, whose members are colloquially known as "Bandits", is a geographically separated unit of Mission Delta 4, a subcomponent of the U.S. Space Force.

== Mission ==
=== Space Domain Awareness ===
7 SWS (pronounced 'Swiss') is primarily responsible for Space Domain Awareness along two lines of effort: Integrated Missile Warning & Defense (IMW/D) and Space Domain Awareness (SDA). Its passive mission is IMW/D for which they only take action after a missile event has occurred. After autonomously sensing a missile within the coverage area the crew takes action in order to warn senior leaders of threats. All other times, the crew is actively engaged with the radar equipment, tuning and managing radar energy to best acquire, discern, track, and disseminate space object observations.

=== Integrated Missile Warning & Defense (IMW/D) ===
7 SWS is responsible for detecting submarine-launched ballistic missiles (SLBM) fired from the Pacific Ocean and Intercontinental Ballistic Missiles. The unit then determines how many missiles in flight, probable destination, and reports to the North American Aerospace Defense Command's missile warning center, Cheyenne Mountain AFS; United States Space Command; and National Command Authority.

Speed is a key factor in day-to-day squadron activities. Within 60 seconds after detecting a launch, the crew on duty has to determine if the detection is valid, under investigation, or anomalous due to computer, mechanical or personnel error. After that, the crew determines the number of launched vehicles and provides impact predictions on North America. Once the information is determined, the unit passes updates to the appropriate authorities.

7 SWS's corollary mission of Missile Defense supports the Ground-Based Midcourse Defense (GMD) element of the Ballistic Missile Defense System. This program's objective is the defense of the United States against a threat of a limited strategic ballistic missile attack. The unit's Upgraded Early Warning Radar (UEWR) detects, acquires, and tracks inbound missiles to provide the necessary data to classify and engage the target. This target data allows the GMD Fire Control and Communications element to generate a weapons task plan, allowing for the engagement, interception, and negation of threat of a ballistic missile reentry vehicle in the exoatmospheric region of space.

=== Satellite Surveillance ===
As missile threats are not common, the squadron's day-to-day mission is to track earth-orbiting satellites, and reports the information to the 18th Space Control Squadron (18 SPCS) at Vandenberg Space Force Base. This information is then combined with information from other sensors to form a satellite catalog. The CSpOC uses the catalog to keep track of more than 16,000 objects in orbit. The catalog is also used to generate the United Nations Registry Report, so national and international agencies can make sure new satellites will safely launch and orbit.

=== Equipment ===
The PAVE PAWS radar uses nearly 3,600 small active antenna elements coordinated by two computers. One computer is on-line at all times, while the second automatically takes control if the first fails. The computers control the distribution of energy to the antennas to form precise patterns, allowing the radar to detect objects moving at a very high speed since no mechanical parts limit the radar sweep. The radar can change its point of focus in milliseconds, while conventional radars may take up to a minute to mechanically swing from one area to another. The main building is shaped like a pyramid with a triangular base 105 feet on each side. The two radiating faces are tilted back 20 degrees. Pave PAWS radar beams reach outward for nearly 3,000 nautical miles in a 240-degree sweep. At its extreme range, it can detect an object the size of a small car. Smaller objects can be detected at closer range.

== History ==
The Air Force finished construction of the PAVE PAWS site at Beale in October 1979. The unit was originally part of Aerospace Defense Command 26th Aerospace Division. In December 1979, it became part of Strategic Air Command. It attained initial operational capability in August 1980.

The unit transferred to Air Force Space Command in May 1983, eventually becoming the 7th Missile Warning Squadron (7 MWS). When the Air Force reorganized in 1992, the 21st Space Wing activated at Peterson AFB. 7 MWS moved to the 21st SW and was renamed "7 SWS". In 2007, 7 SWS completed the upgrade to Upgraded Early Warning Radar.

== Previous designations ==
- 7th Space Warning Squadron (1991–present)
- 7th Missile Warning Squadron (1979–1991)

== Assignments ==
=== Branch ===
United States Space Force

=== Functional Command ===
Space Operations Command

=== Mission Delta ===
Mission Delta 4

== List of commanders ==
- Lt Col Dale R. Madison, Aug 1996 – 1998
- Lt Col Dale Shirasago, 1998 – 2000
- Lt Col Dane Hollenga, 2000 – 2002
- Lt Col David Sutton, 2002 – 2004
- Lt Col Russell Pulliam, 2004 – 2006
- Lt Col Keith Skinner, 2006 – July 2008
- Lt Col Corey J. Keppler, July 2008 – 2010
- Lt Col Scott M. Schroff, 2010 – 2012
- Lt Col Mark J. Sorapuru, 2012 – June 2014
- Lt Col Miguel A. Cruz, June 2014 – June 2016
- Lt Col Jason L. Terry, June 2016 – June 2018
- Lt Col Charles S. Sandusky, June 2018 – July 2020
- Lt Col Blake R. Hoagland, July 2020 – June 2022
- Lt Col Daniel Boyd, June 2022 – June 2024

== Decorations ==
- Air Force Outstanding Unit Award
  - 1 Jan 1998 – 31 Dec 1998
  - 1 Oct 1997 – 30 Sep 1999
