= 7th Infantry Brigade (Indonesia) =

- Brigade Infanteri 7/Rimba Raya
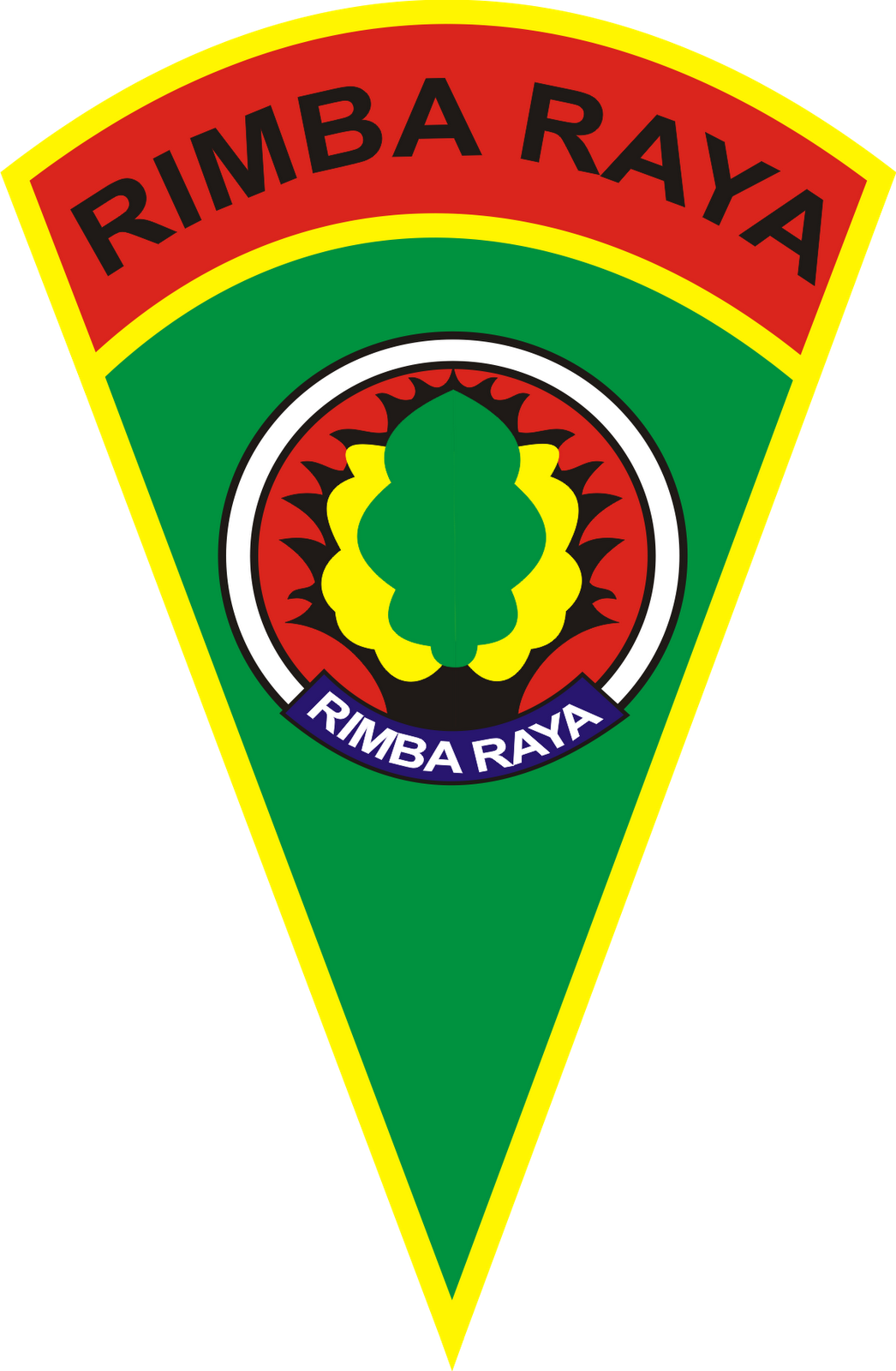
- Logo of the 7th Infantry Brigade
- Founded: 30 April 1962; Reactivated: 12 April 2007
- Branch: Indonesian Army
- Part of: Kodam Bukit Barisan
- Garrison/HQ: Deli Serdang, North Sumatra

The 7th Infantry Brigade (Indonesian: Brigade Infanteri 7, abbr. Brigif 7/RR) is an infantry brigade of the Indonesian Army under the Bukit Barisan Military Command. Its headquarters is located in Deli Serdang.

== History ==
The brigade was first formed following an order by Bukit Barisan's Kodam Commander on 28 April 1962, but the formal formation was done on 30 April. It was initially composed of two infantry battalions: the 125th and the 138th. The battalions under the brigade were switched in 1963 to the 121st, 122nd, and 123rd. The brigade was strengthened in 1964 due to the Indonesia–Malaysia confrontation, being reinforced by one artillery battalion, one cavalry company, and an engineering company. Three territorial defense districts (Langkat, Deli Serdang, and Medan) were also subordinated to the brigade. The additional units were returned to the Kodam after the confrontation subsided. The 123rd battalion was exchanged for the 126th battalion in 1966.

Sometime around 1982, a new headquarters for the brigade was built at Galang, in Deli Serdang Regency. On 7 December 1984, the brigade was liquidated. It was reactivated, along with two other previously deactivated infantry brigades and two newly formed brigades, on 12 April 2007.

== Organization ==
Upon its reformation in 2007, the brigade contained three infantry battalions:

- 7th Infantry Brigade
  - Brigade HQ
  - 121st Infantry Battalion
  - 122nd Infantry Battalion
  - 125th Infantry Battalion
