= 7th Signal Regiment =

7th Signal Regiment may refer to:

- 7th Signal Regiment (United Kingdom), former regiment of the Royal Corps of Signals, British Army
- 7th Signal Regiment (Australia), current Australian Army signals intelligence unit
- 7th Signal Regiment (Italy), current regiment of the Italian Army
