= Taufik Ikram Jamil =

Indonesian writer

Taufik Ikram Jamil (Telukbetung, Bengkalis, Riau, September 19, 1963) is an Indonesian writer and journalist. He writes fiction, poetry and historical studies.

== Work ==
Jamil's short story collections are Membaca Hang Jebat (1995), Sandiwara Hang Tuah (1996), Hikayat Batu-Batu (2005) and Hikayat Suara-Suara (2016). His novels are Hempasan Gelombang (1998) and Gelombang Sunyi (2001). His poetry collections are Tersebab Haku Melayu (1994), Tersebab Aku Melayu (2010), Tersebab Daku Melayu (2015) and a trilingual edition of What’s Left and Other Poems (2015).

Jamil has received several awards, including Best Cultural Achievement from the Sagang Foundation for Sandiwara Hang Tuah in 1997, Best Indonesian Short Story from the Jakarta Arts Council for “Jumat Pagi Bersama Amuk” in 1998 and Outstanding Artist from Sagang Foundation in 2003.

In 1991 Jamil established Yayasan Membaca, a foundation devoted to supporting reading activities and that publishes the journal Menyimak, which features works of local writers. In 1999 this organization became the Pusaka Riau Foundation, which is active in culture, the arts and publishing.

Jamil also founded the Riau Malay Academy of Arts (Akademi Kesenian Melayu Riau) and served as general director of the Riau Arts Council (2002–2007).
