= 7th Regiment =

7th Regiment, or 7th Infantry Regiment may refer to:

== Active units ==
- 7th Parachute Regiment Royal Horse Artillery
- 7th Field Regiment, Royal Australian Artillery
- 7th Field Artillery Regiment (United States)
- 7th Cavalry Regiment (United States)
- 7th Marine Regiment (United States)
- 7th Toronto Regiment, RCA - Canadian army
- 7th Infantry Regiment (South Korea)
- 7th Infantry Regiment (United States)
- 7th Army Aviation Regiment (Ukraine)
- 7th Infantry Regiment (Argentina)
- 7th Infantry Regiment (Lithuania)
- 7th Separate Guards Motor Rifle Regiment (Russia)

== Former Units ==
- 7th Queen's Own Hussars - British army cavalry
- 7th Royal Tank Regiment - World War II British army unit
- 7th Medium Regiment, Royal Canadian Artillery - World War II Canadian army unit
- 2/7th Armoured Regiment (Australia) - World War II unit
- 7th Hariana Lancers - British Indian army unit
- 7th Light Cavalry - British Indian army unit
- 7th Regiment of Foot, later known as the Royal Fusiliers
- 7th Air Reconnaissance Regiment, Yugoslav Air Force unit

== American Civil War units ==
=== Cavalry ===
- 7th Regiment Illinois Volunteer Cavalry
- 7th Regiment Iowa Volunteer Cavalry
- 7th Michigan Volunteer Cavalry Regiment
- 7th West Virginia Volunteer Cavalry Regiment

=== Infantry ===
- 7th California Infantry Regiment (1861), also known as the 7th California Volunteer Infantry
- 7th Illinois Volunteer Infantry Regiment
- 7th Regiment Indiana Infantry (3 months)
- 7th Regiment Indiana Infantry (3 years)
- 7th Iowa Volunteer Infantry Regiment
- 7th Regiment Maryland Volunteer Infantry
- 7th Regiment Massachusetts Volunteer Infantry
- 7th Michigan Volunteer Infantry Regiment
- 7th Minnesota Volunteer Infantry Regiment
- 7th New Hampshire Volunteer Regiment
- 7th New York Militia Regiment
- 7th New York Volunteer Infantry Regiment
- 7th Ohio Infantry Regiment
- 7th United States Colored Infantry
- 7th Vermont Infantry
- 7th West Virginia Volunteer Infantry Regiment
- 7th Wisconsin Volunteer Infantry Regiment

== American Revolutionary War units ==
- 7th Massachusetts Regiment
- 7th Virginia Regiment
- 7th Connecticut Regiment
- 7th Maryland Regiment
- 7th Continental Regiment
- 7th Pennsylvania Regiment
- 7th North Carolina Regiment

== United States State militia and National Guard units 1865-1917 ==
- 7th California Infantry Regiment (National Guard)
- 7th Illinois Infantry Regiment (National Guard)
- 7th Ohio Infantry Regiment (National Guard)
- 7th New York Militia Regiment (National Guard)

== Spanish–American War units ==
- 7th California Volunteer Infantry Regiment (1898)
- 7th Illinois Volunteer Infantry Regiment (1898)
- 7th Ohio Volunteer Infantry Regiment (1898)

== See also ==
- 7th Regiment Drum and Bugle Corps, based in New London, Connecticut
- Regiment, a military unit
- 7th Army (disambiguation)
- 7th Brigade (disambiguation)
- 7th Corps (disambiguation)
- 7th Division (disambiguation)
- 7th Signal Regiment (disambiguation)
