= 7th Rila Infantry Division =

Bulgarian Army unit

The 7th Rila Infantry Division was a Bulgarian Army unit that played a significant role in the country's military history, particularly during the Balkan Wars, World War I, and World War II. Named after the Rila Mountains, it was primarily formed from soldiers recruited in southwestern Bulgaria, making it deeply tied to the region.

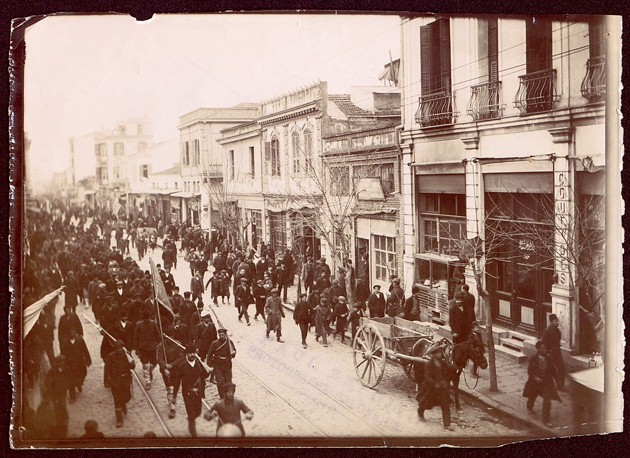
7th Rila Infantry Division entering Thessaloniki on 28 October 1912.

== History ==
The division was formed in 1904 with headquarters in Dupnitsa. Stefan Toshev was appointed as the first commander of the division. The division consisted of the 14th Macedonian, 22nd Thracian, 13th Rila Mountain, 26th Pernik Infantry Regiments and the 7th Artillery Regiment, 7th Pioneer Company, 1st Cavalry Division, 1st Horse Regiment, and 7th Division Quartermaster's Office.

During the First Balkan War, under the leadership of General Georgi Todorov, the division took part in the Bulgarian push against the Ottoman Empire. Its soldiers fought in battles such as the Siege of Adrianople (Edirne). During the Second Balkan War, the division was tasked with defending Bulgaria's southern borders, particularly against Greece and Serbia.

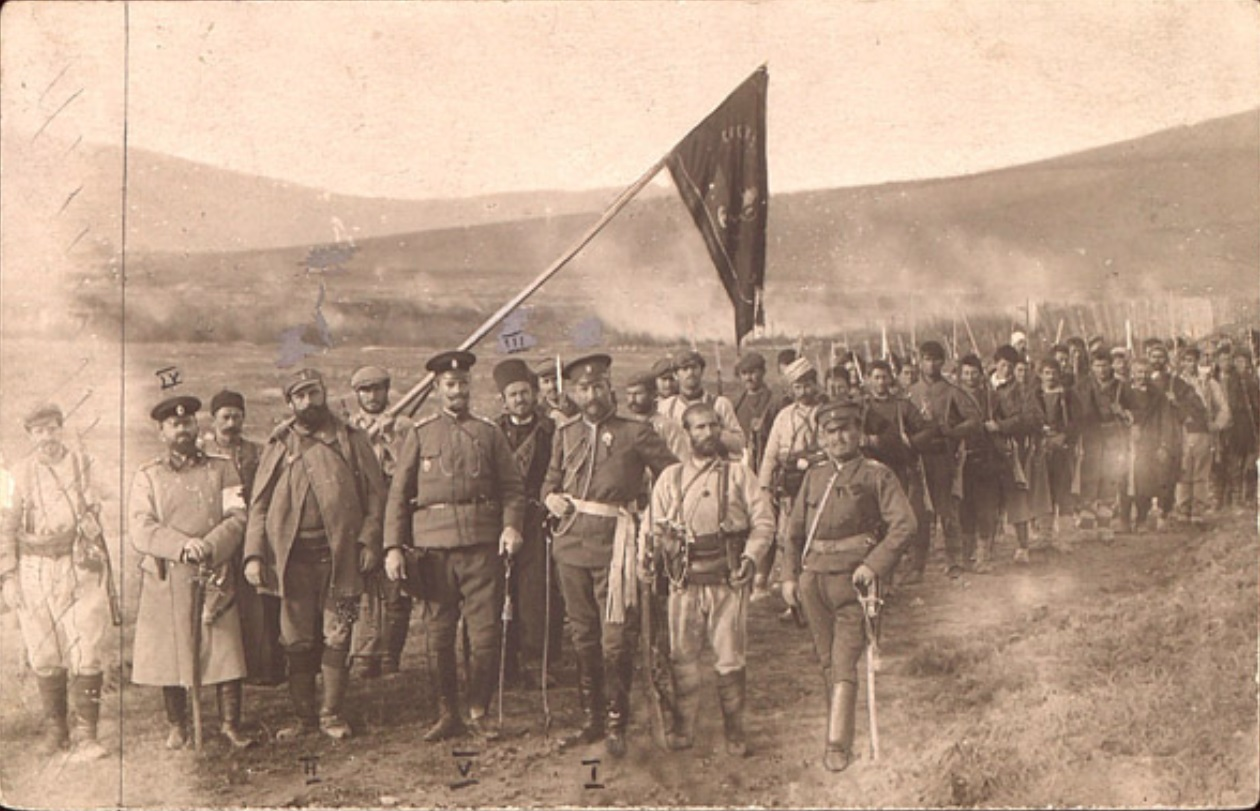
Yane Sandanski supporting 7th Rila Infantry Division.

During the First World War it was led by General Valko Vasilev. After Bulgaria joined the Central Powers, the 7th Rila Division was deployed to the Macedonian front. It participated in battles against the Entente forces (primarily French and Serbian troops). Its involvement helped secure Bulgarian control over parts of Vardar Macedonia for much of the war. After Bulgaria's defeat in World War I, the division was reorganized under the restrictions of the Treaty of Neuilly (1919). Like other parts of the Bulgarian military, its size and strength were significantly reduced.

During the Second World War it led by General Stefan Taralezhkov. During which the division took part in the Bregalnitsa-Strumica Operation.

The Division was disbanded in 1956.
