= Edward Wellington Pahala Tambunan =

Indonesian military figure and politician

Major General Edward Wellington Pahala Tambunan
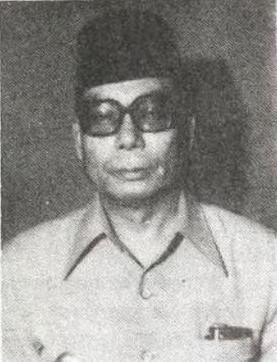

Governor of North Sumatra
- In office 12 June 1978 – 13 June 1983
- President: Suharto
- Preceded by: Marah Halim Harahap
- Succeeded by: Kaharuddin Nasution

Member of the People's Consultative Assembly
- In office 1 October 1977 – 13 June 1983

Personal details
- Born: 14 January 1928 Balige, North Sumatra, Dutch East Indies
- Died: 17 January 2006 (aged 78) Jakarta, Indonesia
- Party: Golkar

Military service
- Allegiance: Indonesia
- Branch/service: Indonesian Army; Indonesian Navy
- Years of service: 1945–1946; 1948–1977 (Army); 1946–1948 (Navy)
- Rank: Major General
- Battles/wars: Indonesian National Revolution: Operation Product; Operation Kraai; Darul Islam; Madiun Affair

Edward Wellington Pahala "Tam" Tambunan (popularly mistaken as Edward Waldemar Pahala Tambunan) (14 January 1928 – 17 January 2006) was an Indonesian military figure and politician who became the Governor of North Sumatra from 1978 to 1983.

== Early life ==
Tambunan was born on 14 January 1928 in the small town of Balige, North Sumatra. He began his education in the Hollandsch-Inlandsche School (Dutch school for native students), and continued his studies at the Agricultural Junior High School.

== Military career ==
Tambunan joined the Indonesian Army in 1945, when he became the squad commander in Sidoarjo. The same year, he was promoted as a platoon commander. He moved to Malang, and became a military staff member in the city. In 1946, he moved to Bojonegoro, where he joined TLRI (Sea Army of the Republic of Indonesia, a non-sailor unit inside the Indonesian Navy, similar to marines) from 1946 until 1948. He became the commander of the 3rd Battalion of the 19th Ressort of the TLRI from 1947 until 1948. After the TLRI was merged into the Indonesian Army, he rejoined the army and was involved in beach defense and the defense of Tuban from 1948 until 1950. He also became a member of the Indonesian delegation in a local joint committee between the Indonesian Army and the Dutch Army, which was formed in 1950.

During the Indonesian National Revolution, Tambunan fought against the Dutch in various battles, such as in Operation Product, Operation Kraai as well as in the Darul Islam rebellion, and the Madiun Affair.

After the revolution, Tambunan was active as a company commander in the 5th Military Regional Command/Brawijaya from 1949 until 1952. In 1952, he enrolled as a student at the Special Infantry Course, and from 1956 until 1957, he studied at the Indonesian Army Command and General Staff College. After graduating from the college, he became a teacher for military subjects and was involved in the research and development section of the Indonesian Army.

In 1961, Tambunan, along with Antonius Josef Witono, became the first officers from Indonesia to attend Australian Staff College in 1961. During his time in the college, he was known as Tam Tambunan and was known for his hobby of collecting Australian idioms. He graduated from the college in 1962. Upon his return to Indonesia, Tambunan became a mentor to Australian Lieutenant Colonel Colin East when he attended as the first Australian student at the Indonesian Army Command and General Staff College in 1964. Tambunan and Witono were both commemorated by the Indonesia-Australia Defence Alumni Association with the Sarsono–Tambunan Memorial Lecture Series held in Indonesia and Australia on a quarterly basis.

On 1 November 1968, Tambunan was promoted as a colonel and became the chief of staff of the 1st Military Regional Command/Bukit Barisan, located in North Sumatra. His term ended on 28 September 1971 and he was replaced by Colonel SMT Hutagalung. He was transferred to Java, and in the same year became the Deputy Governor of Educational Operations in the Republic of Indonesia Armed Forces Academy. In 1974, he was transferred to Sulawesi and became the commander of the 13th Regional Military Command/Merdeka from 25 February 1974 until 8 January 1976. After his term ended, he was transferred once again to Jakarta, and assumed office as the commander of the Indonesian Army Command and General Staff College from 3 March 1976 until 25 May 1978.

== Governor of North Sumatra ==
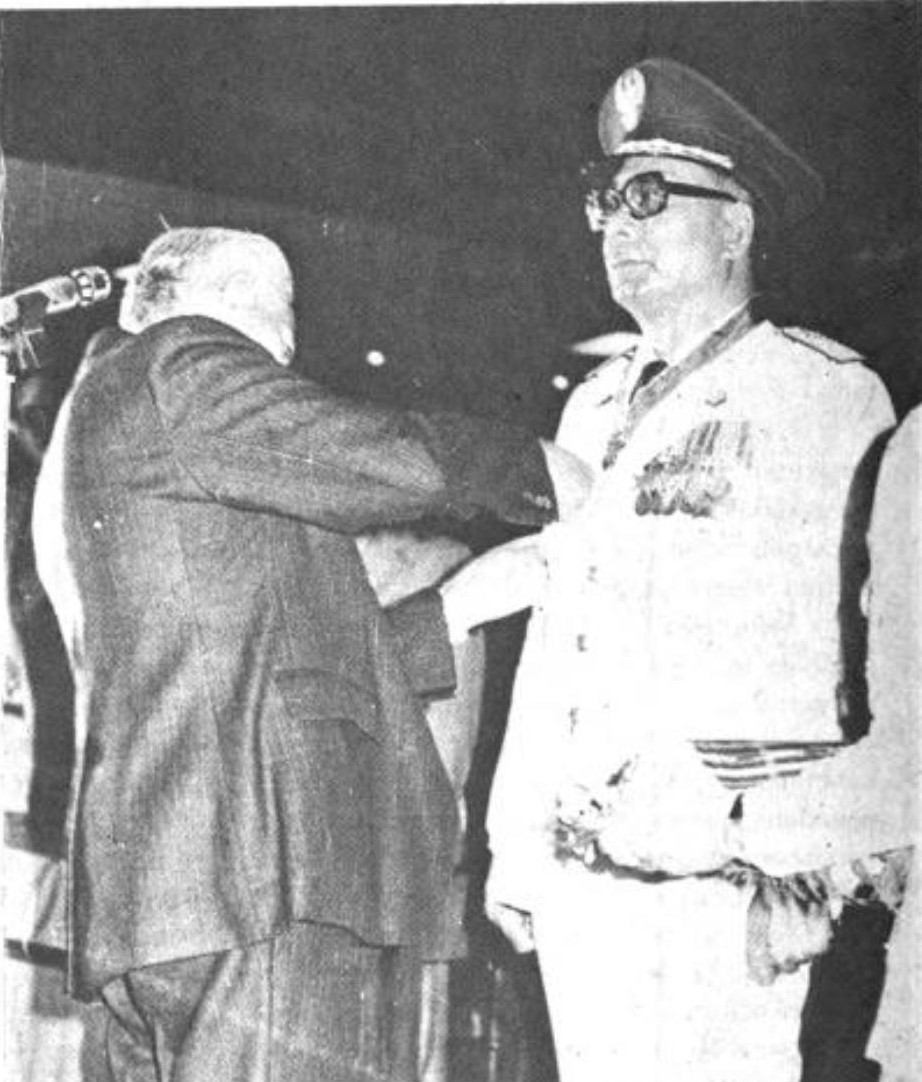
Inauguration of Tambunan by Maraden Panggabean.

On 12 June 1978, Tambunan was officially inaugurated as the Governor of North Sumatra by the Coordinating Minister for Political and Security Affairs Maraden Panggabean. The inauguration ceremony was held at the building of the Regional People's Representative Council of North Sumatra, and was attended by the Commander of the 1st Regional Defense Command G.H. Mantik.

One of the main priorities during Tambunan's governorship was the creation of new subdistricts in North Sumatra. In 1981, Tambunan enacted a decree that adds 10 subdistricts in North Sumatra, specifically in Binjai, Pematangsiantar, and Sibolga. Further additions was enacted in 1982, when the administrative city of Kisaran and Padangsidempuan was formed. 5 new subdistricts were formed, with 2 subdistricts in Kisaran and 3 subdistricts in Padangsidempuan.

Tambunan also formed the new post of assistant governor for the purpose of coordination, supervision, and decentralization. There were four assistant governors, each tasked with assisting the governor in four different regions. The region was centered in main cities of the province: Sibolga, Pematangsiantar, Medan, and Kisaran.

In the agricultural sector, Tambunan enacted a decree for the special intensification and extensification (INSUS) for rice production. This decree was enacted to counter the low output of rice in North Sumatra at that time. The INSUS status was later upgraded to a full economic operation, named as the Operasi Desa Makmur (ODEMA, Operation Prosperous Village).

Tambunan was also one of the initiators for the establishment of North Sumatra as the third tourist destination in Indonesia after Java and Bali. He introduced a cultural calendar, and planned several traditional festivities and activities for each month. One of the festivals, the Danau Toba Festival, continues to this day and received priority attention from the central government.

Tambunan was known as a disciplinarian and always attended events on time. At one occasion, Tambunan was invited to an event held by a government employee. The event was planned to begin on 9 AM, and Tambunan came to the event on time, but the event organizer was not yet ready. Tambunan did not say a single word about the incident, but since then, government employee began paying attention to punctuality. Another characteristic of Tambunan was his clothing style, where he would always wear a red songkok and teluk belanga clothing.

To promote ethnic diversity in North Sumatra, Tambunan always began his speech with the greeting "Hoooi! Horas! Mejuah-juah! Ya'ahowu!". The greeting was the combination of greetings used by the four ethnics in North Sumatra, the Malay, Batak, Karo, and Nias.

== Death ==
On 17 January 2006, Tambunan died in his house located at Central Kayu Putih Street, Central Jakarta. The President of Indonesia at that time, Susilo Bambang Yudhoyono, came to pay homage.

== Religious life ==
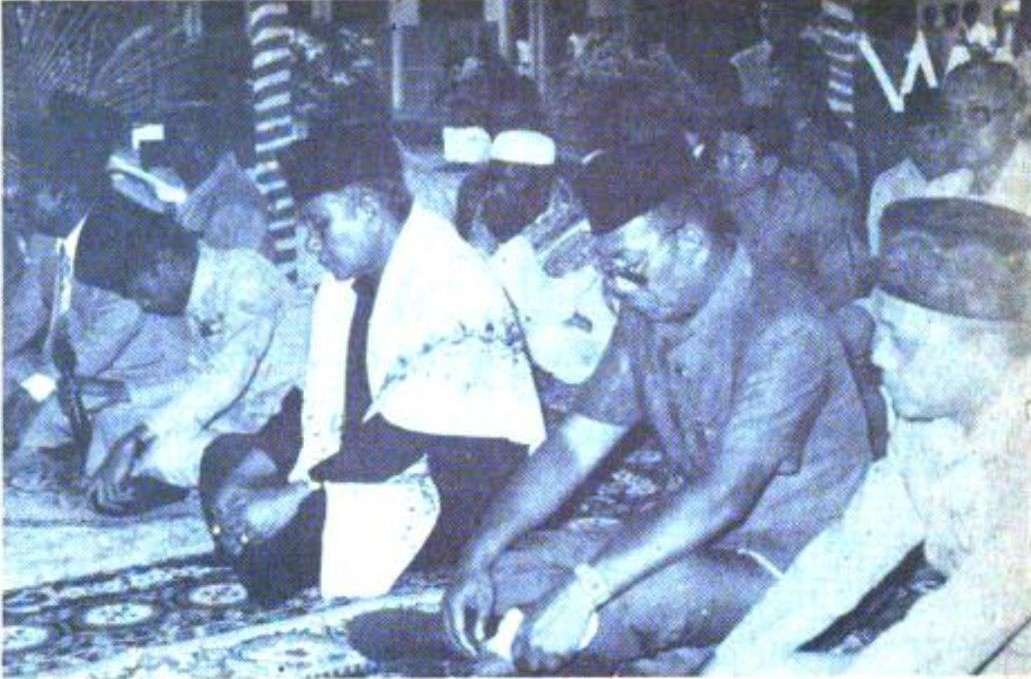
EWP Tambunan (second from right) and Amirmachmud (third from right) attending a Muslim religious ceremony. Although he was a Christian, Susilo Bambang Yudhoyono remarked him as having "a high sense of tolerance".

Tambunan was a Christian Protestant. He was a member of the Batak Christian Protestant Church.

== Bibliography ==
- General Elections Institution (1982), Buku Pelengkap VI Pemilihan Umum 1982: Ringkasan Riwayat Hidup dan Riwayat Perjuangan Anggota Majelis Permusyawaratan Rakyat Hasil Pemilihan Umum 1982 yang Bukan Anggota Dewan Perwakilan Rakyat [Supplement VI of the 1982 General Elections: Summary of Biography and Battle Records of the Members of the People's Consultative Assembly Elected at the 1982 General Elections Who is Not Part of the People's Representative Council] (in Indonesian), Jakarta
- Bachtiar, Harsya W. (1988), Siapa dia? Perwira Tinggi Tentara Nasional Indonesia Angkatan Darat (TNI-AD) [Who is He? Officers of the Indonesian Army] (in Indonesian), Jakarta, ISBN 9789794281000
- Tuk Wan Haria, Muhammad (2006), Gubernur Sumatera dan Para Gubernur Sumatera Utara [Governor of Sumatra and Governors of North Sumatra] (in Indonesian), Medan: Library and Regional Archives Bureau of North Sumatra, ISBN 9789791521208
