= Kaharuddin Nasution =

Indonesian military officer, politician, and diplomat (1925–1990)

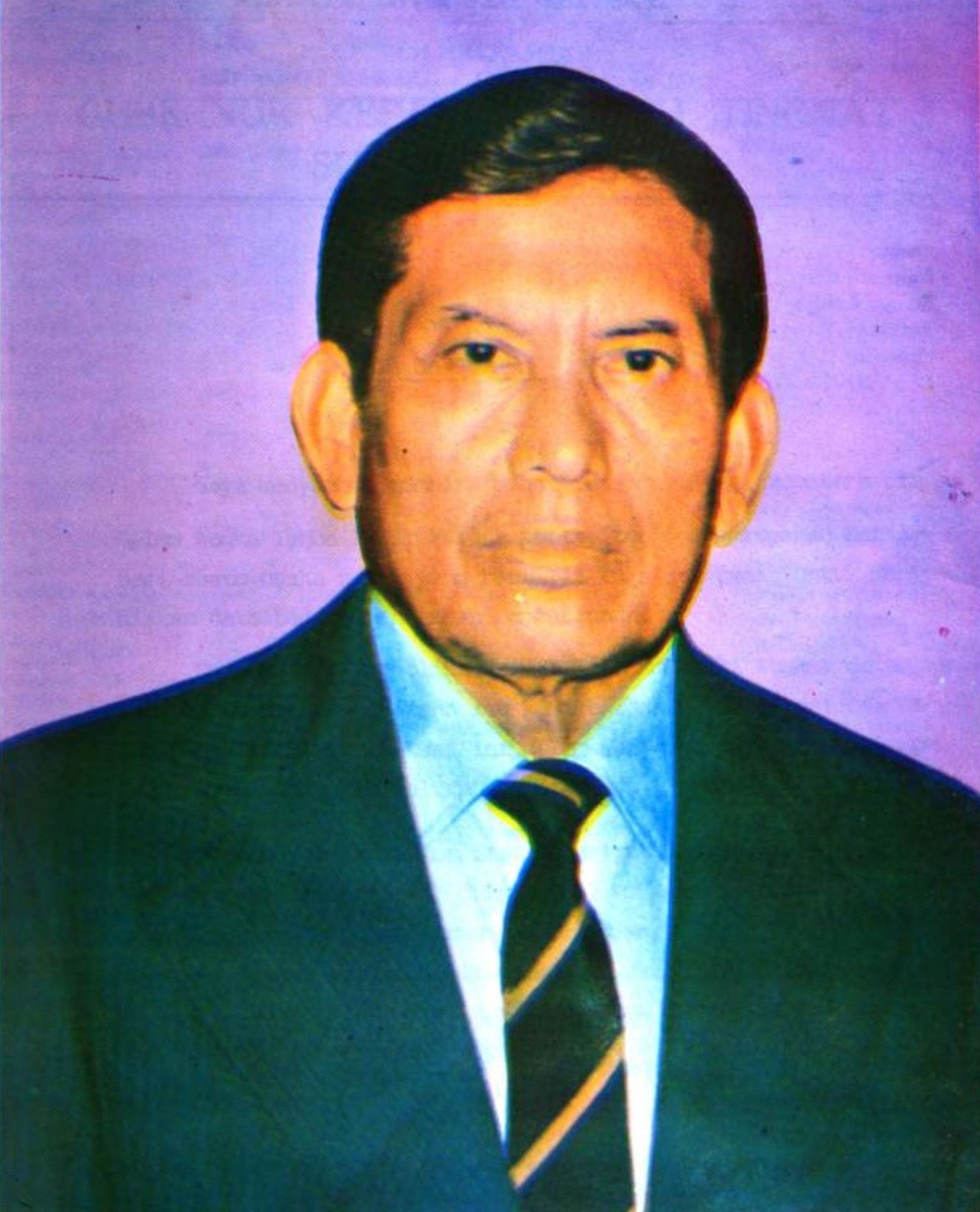
- Official portrait, c. 1983

Governor of North Sumatra
- In office 13 June 1983 – 13 June 1988
- Preceded by: E. W. P. Tambunan
- Succeeded by: Raja Inal Siregar

Ambassador of Indonesia to South Korea
- In office 12 September 1978 – 30 January 1982
- Preceded by: Sarwo Edhie Wibowo
- Succeeded by: R. Eddie Soeprapto

Governor of Riau
- In office 6 January 1960 – 15 November 1966
- Preceded by: Amin Nasution
- Succeeded by: Arifin Achmad

Speaker of the Riau Regional House of Representatives
- In office 1961–1966
- Preceded by: Office established
- Succeeded by: Sam Wehantouw

Personal details
- Born: 23 July 1925 Medan, Dutch East Indies (present-day Indonesia)
- Died: 25 September 1990 (aged 65) Jakarta, Indonesia
- Party: Golkar
- Spouse: Siti Roestamy (m. 1958)
- Children: 4

Military service
- Allegiance: Empire of Japan (1944–1945); Indonesia (1945–1978)
- Branch/service: Japanese Navy (1944–1945); Indonesian Army (1945–1978)
- Rank: Lieutenant Lieutenant General
- Battles/wars: World War II: Solomon Islands campaign; Philippines campaign; Indonesian National Revolution: Operation Product; Operation Kraai; Madiun Affair; APRA coup d'état; Post-independence: Darul Islam; PRRI/Permesta; Indonesia–Malaysia confrontation; Indonesian mass killings of 1965–66; Papua conflict

Kaharuddin Nasution (23 July 1925 – 25 September 1990) was an Indonesian military officer, politician, and diplomat. He served as the governor of Riau from 1960 to 1966 and later as the governor of North Sumatra from 1983 to 1988. He was also appointed ambassador to South Korea.

== Early life ==
Kaharuddin Nasution was born on 23 July 1925 in Medan, Dutch East Indies. He began his education at the Hollandsch-Inlandsche School (an elementary school for native children) in 1930, and graduated from the school in 1937. He continued his studies at the Meer Uitgebreid Lager Onderwijs (junior high school) in Medan and graduated from the school in 1940.

After graduating from the school, he was sent by his parents to the Indonesisch-Nederlandsche School in Kayutanam, West Sumatra, which was owned by Inyiek Mohammad Syafei, the future Minister of Education. He did not graduate from the school and returned to Medan in 1941.

== In the Imperial Japanese Navy ==
During the Japanese occupation of the Dutch East Indies, a recruitment drive for Imperial Japanese Navy (IJN) officers was held in Medan. Nasution joined the recruitment program and underwent naval education in Bandung and Kyoto. He was finally given the rank of lieutenant and became the steersman in the Haraokamaru ship in 1944. He participated in the Pacific Theater and fought against the US forces in the Solomon Islands campaign and the Philippines campaign. During a naval battle in the Philippines, his ship was hit and caught fire. Nasution was injured and almost died.

After the surrender of Japan, all IJN ships were ordered to return to Japan. When his ship anchored in Tokyo, Nasution heard a radio broadcast about the proclamation of Indonesian Independence. Nasution deserted his ship and secretly boarded a cargo ship heading for Southeast Asia. After the ship arrived in Singapore, Nasution got on board another ship that was bound for Jakarta.

== In the Indonesian Army ==
=== Indonesian National Revolution ===
After arriving in Jakarta, Nasution joined the fledgling Indonesian Army. He was given the rank of second lieutenant and became the commander of the Mobile Battalion Company. As the commander of the mobile battalion, he was tasked to safeguard the demarcation line between the Indonesian army and the Dutch forces in West Java, Central Java, and East Java.

In 1948, he was promoted to first lieutenant and was put as the commander of the Siliwangi War Battalion. During this period, he took part in crushing the Madiun Affair in Solo, Wonogiri, Ponorogo, and Madiun, and faced the Dutch forces during the politionele acties and the Legion of the Just Ruler during the APRA coup d'état.

=== Post-revolution ===
After the Indonesian National Revolution ended, he was promoted to captain in 1950 but still held the same command. In 1953, Nasution was transferred to the Jakarta Military Command as the Commander of the 1st BASIS Battalion. He became the acting commander of the Jakarta Military Command after the previous commander, Akil Prawiradiredja, was put on house arrest.

=== Commander of the RPKAD ===
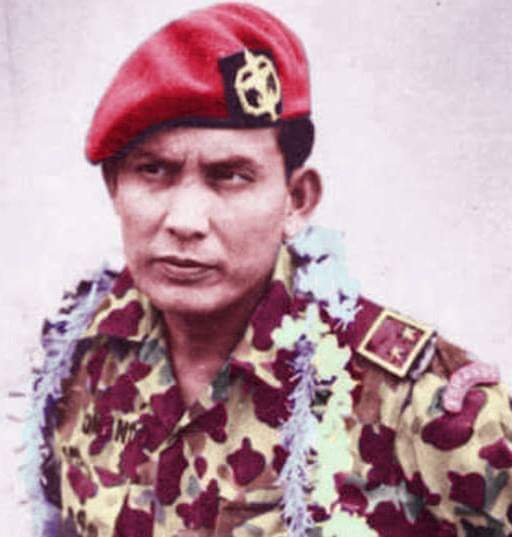
Kaharuddin Nasution as the Commander of the RPKAD.

In 1956, Nasution was appointed as the Commander of the Special Forces Regiment of the Indonesian Army (RPKAD), after his predecessor, Mayor Djailani, was put in prison following the Lubis Affair. Under his command, the regiment took part in putting down the possible mutiny of a garrison in Manado.

Later on, Nasution was put as the commander of the Tegas Joint Operation, an operation to crush the PRRI (Revolutionary Government of the Republic of Indonesia)'s forces in Riau. Nasution appointed Commander Lieutenant Colonel Wiriadinata from the Air Force and Mayor Indra Subagyo from the Navy as his deputy. The operation consisted of one RPKAD company, two PGT (Pasukan Gerak Tjepat, Quick Reaction Force), and an infantry battalion from Central Java that were planned to be airdropped into Pekanbaru. Another seaborne task force would later be deployed on the shores of Riau. This seaborne task force consisted of one KKO (Indonesian Marine Corps) company, a company of infantry from East Java, and two RPKAD companies. Besides that, several BRIMOB (Mobile Brigade Corps) units also joined the operation under the command of Police Commissary Sutjipto Danukusumo.

The operation began at the dawn of 12 March 1958, when the Kangaroo Command, consisting of one RPKAD company and two PGT (Pasukan Gerak Tjepat, Quick Reaction Force) companies, was parachuted to capture the Simpangtiga Airfield and the city of Pekanbaru. The operation was a success, as by 7 AM the Simpangtiga Airfield was fully occupied by the RPKAD forces. At midnight, the infantry battalion managed to land on the airfield. The command and the battalion occupied the city with practically no resistance, except at a clash between PRRI rebels and the RPKAD forces in the Lubuk Jambi and Kiliran Jao, which resulted in the death of Captain Ahmad Fadillah, an officer from RPKAD.

== Governor of Riau ==
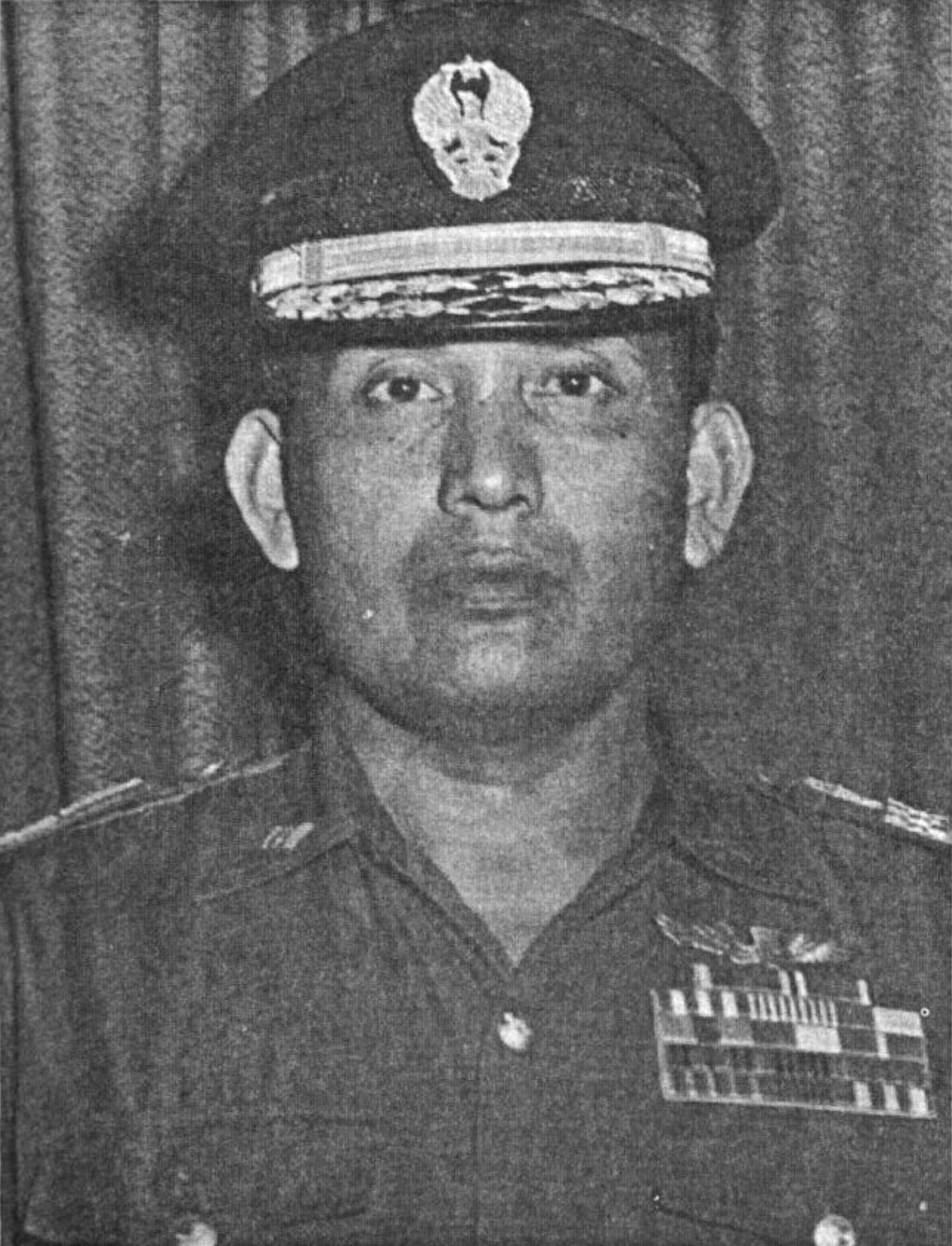
Kaharuddin Nasution as the Governor of Riau.

=== Works ===
After his successful command in the Tegas Operation, Nasution was promoted to colonel in 1960 and was appointed as the Penguasa Perang (literally War Ruler) of the Mainland Riau Region and the commander of the Wirabima Military Command, which covered the territory of Riau. In the same year, Nasution was promoted to brigadier general and became the Penguasa Perang of the Riau Province. As the warlord of the province, he automatically became the chairman of the Executive Body (Badan Pelaksana) of the Riau Province.

With this position, Nasution was formally inaugurated as the governor of Riau on 6 January 1960, replacing Sutan Mohammad Amin. The Executive Body was dissolved and was replaced by a Daily Government Body (Badan Pemerintahan Harian, BPH). The BPH was later tasked to form the Regional People's Representative Council of Mutual Assistance in the Riau Province. The composition of the council was based on the results of the 1955 Indonesian legislative election. Alongside the BPH, Nasution also created the post of Deputy Governor to assist him. He appointed Datuk Wan Abdulrachman on 25 April 1962 for the position, but he soon opposed Nasution after Nasution accused him of cooperating with Malaysia during the Indonesia–Malaysia confrontation period. Nasution would later arrest him under the accusation of participating in the United Republic of Indonesia, a secessionist movement.

As the Governor of Riau, Nasution concurrently held several positions during his term, namely as the Speaker of the Regional People's Representative Council of Riau from 1961 until 1966, the honorary office as the Chairman of the Rectorate Council of the Islamic University of Riau and the Riau State University from 1963 until 1966, and as the chairman of the National Front branch of Riau and the '45 Struggle Organization. He also became a member of the People's Consultative Assembly from 15 September 1960 until his removal from office on 15 November 1966.

During his tenure as the Governor of Riau, President Sukarno ordered him to move the capital of Riau from Tanjungpinang, which at that time was still using the Singapore dollar, to the newly liberated Pekanbaru, which already was using the Indonesian Rupiah. Upon hearing this news, many Riau civil employees refused to be moved to Pekanbaru, and opted to resign instead.

Assisted by Ahmad Faqih, an expert in public works, Kaharuddin planned Pekanbaru as a modern city. Kaharuddin modeled the Pekanbaru after the New York City, with a road system in the form of streets and avenues. After building the road system, Nasution began to construct government buildings and houses of worship in Riau, namely the Governor's Office, Trikora Building, An-Nur Great Mosque, Dwikora Stadion, Hotel Riau, Kartini building, and also thousands of accommodations and offices.

Kaharuddin obtained the fund for the capital move from the assistance of the Caltex company. With an agreement between the company and the Pertamina along with the Department of Mining, Nasution was allowed to utilize all of the vehicles previously owned by Caltex. Nasution then auctioned all of the vehicles, and the money obtained was used to fund the construction of the new capital.

=== Removal from office ===
Following the crackdown of the 30 September Movement, a wave of student protests began to storm Riau. Riau students demanded the Riau government to dissolve the Communist Party of Indonesia's branch in Riau and single-handedly took over the offices owned by the party in Riau. Although the student protest was endorsed by the armed forces, Kaharuddin Nasution did not show any support to the protests.

Due to his reluctance to show support to the student movements, on 24 May 1966, associations of Riau students in Java sent a letter to Basuki Rahmat, the Minister of Internal Affairs at that time. The students demanded Rachmat to remove Kaharuddin Nasution from his office. The students also stated that Nasution formed a government system that oppress the people of Riau and that he did not took any actions to clean the government apparatus from communists and vested interests.

A month later, on 28 June 1966, the Ampera Mission, consisted of student representatives, was formed. The group, which consisted of prominent student figures, went to Nasution. When they finally got to meet Nasution, one of their main demands was to release political prisoners which opposed Nasution policies. Nasution then responded by saying that the "Ampera Mission should learn instead and not getting involved in politics". Since then, the members of the Ampera Mission stated that they were continuously spied.

Although continuously being spied, the Ampera Mission continued their action. Under the protection of the Siliwangi Division, the mission organized a rally against the Communist Party of Indonesia in the Dwikora Stadium. With the support of the Siliwangi Division, the Ampera Mission met Nasution again on 5 July 1966. The mission delivered the same demands, but Nasution then stated that the political prisoners were not imprisoned but they were "isolated".

After failing to deliver their demands to the governor, Riau students, under the Indonesian College Students' Action Union (KAMI) and the Indonesian Students' Action Union (KAPI), came to the office of the Regional People's Representative Council of Riau on 15 July 1966. Their presence was met with fierce resistance from the armed forces, and a clash occurred between the students and the armed forces. 15 KAPI members fell on the ground after being hit, kicked, or lunged by the soldiers. Several students, such as Mustafa Noor, Leonard Kaligis, M Arifin, Fauzi Suherman, Agus Jun Batuah, from the Ampera Mission and Imran, Asman, and Juliaman from KAPI and KAMI were arrested.

On 28 August 1966, student groups and the Riau populace issued two demands. The first demand urged the government to create political stability in Riau, and the second demand was to replace the governor as soon as possible. The student groups and the Riau populace proposed Arifin Achmad as the replacement for Nasution. The demand was fulfilled by the central government, as on 15 November 1966, Arifin Achmad was inaugurated by Basuki Rachmat as the acting Governor of Riau. Nasution later left Riau on 27 December 1966.

== Career ==
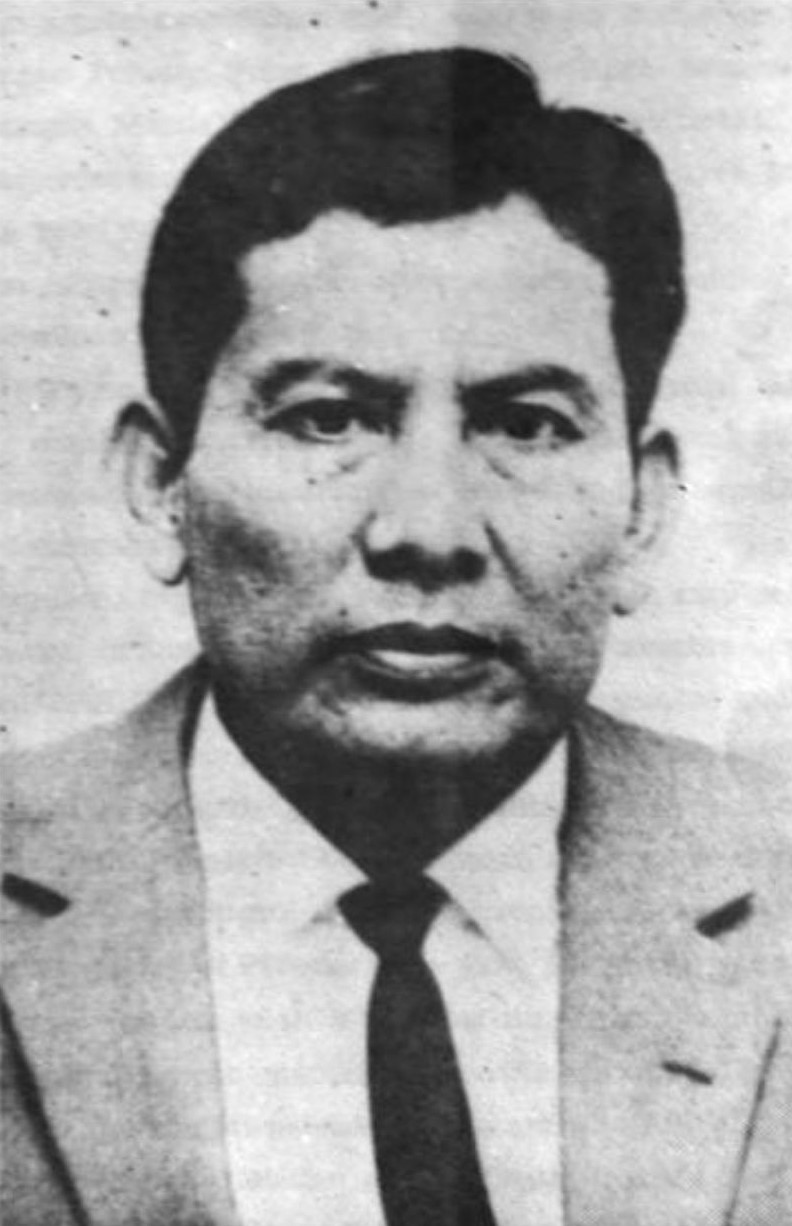
Kaharuddin Nasution as the member of the People's Consultative Assembly.

After he was ousted from the governor's office, Nasution still retained his office as the member of the People's Consultative Assembly. He represented the Armed Forces instead of representing the Riau province.

A year after he left office, Nasution was promoted to brigadier general, and he was inaugurated as the Commander of the Merdeka Regional Military Command on 28 October 1967 until 23 March 1970. During his time in the Merdeka Regional Military Command, he took part in crushing the Free Papua Movement. After that, he was promoted to major general in 1971, and assumed office as the Inspector General of the Indonesian Army until in 1973. He then became the Inspector General of the Ministry of Information in the same year.

On 12 September 1978, alongside four other ambassadors, Nasution was inaugurated as the Ambassador of Indonesia to South Korea, replacing Sarwo Edhie Wibowo. As the ambassador post was a civilian post, he officially resigned from the military after taking office. He would hold the office until 30 January 1982.

== Governor of North Sumatra ==
On 13 June 1983, Nasution was officially inaugurated as the Governor of North Sumatra by the Ministry of Internal Affairs Soepardjo Roestam. He replaced the previous governor, Edward Waldemar Pahala Tambunan.

During his term, Nasution ordered all of the civil servants in North Sumatra to wear white uniforms. He stated that by wearing white uniforms, the civil servants would look cleaner and tidier. He also ordered the construction of the office of the Governor of North Sumatra in the Willem Iskandar Street (now Pancing Street), which was located outside the metropolitan area of Medan.

By the end of Nasution's term, the Integrated Special Operation Maduma (Operasi Khusus Terpadu Maduma, OKT Maduma) was officially enacted. The program was intended to alleviate poverty and increase the regional income in five regencies that were categorized as low income: North Tapanuli, South Tapanuli, Central Tapanuli, Dairi, and Nias.

The economic operation began with a survey of the regencies since the beginning of 1986. Initially, the scope of the economic operation only covered the North, South, and Central Tapanuli, but a presidential decree added Dairi and Nias into the scope of the economic operation. Finally, on 16 October 1986, the operation officially began with the formal opening by Minister of Agriculture in the Sileang Village, Dolok Sanggul, North Tapanuli. A further assessment about the economic operation was conducted by the Social, Economy, and Agricultural Faculty of the University of North Sumatra on 14 September 1988.

To socialize the Maduma economic operation to the populace in the five regencies, a song about the Maduma economic operation was composed by musician Nortier Simanungkalit. The word Maduma in North Tapanuli was popularly known as the abbreviation to Martangiang Dungi Mangula which means pray and work in the Batak language.

As the incumbent governor in North Sumatra, Nasution was nominated by the United Development Party and the Indonesian Democratic Party as the Governor of North Sumatra for the 1988–1993 term. He lost the gubernatorial elections to Raja Inal Siregar, former commander of the Siliwangi Regional Military Command. Raja Inal Siregar was officially inaugurated as the Governor of North Sumatra on 13 June 1988.

== Death ==
On 25 September 1990, Kaharuddin Nasution died in his house in Jakarta. He was buried at the Kalibata Heroes' Cemetery on 26 September 1990, and was posthumously promoted to lieutenant general.

== Dates of rank ==
Rank	Command	Date
Imperial Japanese Navy
Lieutenant	3rd Steerman of the Haraoka Maru	1944
Indonesian Army
Second Lieutenant	Commander of the Mobile Battalion Company of the Army Headquarters in Jogjakarta	1945
First Lieutenant	Commander of the Siliwangi War Battalion	1948
Captain	Commander of the Siliwangi War Battalion	1950
Major	Commander of the Siliwangi War Battalion; Director of the 1st Battle Training Camp	1952
Major	Commander of the 1st BASIS Battalion	1953
Major	Commander of the 1st BASIS Battalion; Acting Commander of the Jakarta Military Command	1955
Major	Commander of the Special Forces Regiment of the Indonesian Army	1956
Major	Commander of the Special Forces Regiment of the Indonesian Army; Commander of the Tegas Operation	1958
Lieutenant Colonel	Commander of the 1st Battle Team Regiment of the 17 August Operation; Warlord of the Mainland Riau Region	1959
Colonel	Commander of the Wirabima Military Resort Command; Warlord of the Mainland Riau Region	1960
Colonel	Governor of Riau; Warlord of the Riau Province	1960
Brigadier General	Commander of the 13th Regional Military Command/Merdeka	1967
Major General	General Inspector of the Indonesian Army	1971
Lieutenant General	posthumously	1990

== Bibliography ==
- Conboy, Kenneth J. (2003), Kopassus: Inside Indonesia's Special Forces, Jakarta, ISBN 9789799589880
- General Elections Institution (1973), Riwayat Hidup Anggota-Anggota Majelis Permusyawaratan Rakyat Hasil Pemilihan Umum 1971 [Biography of the Members of the People's Consultative Assembly from the 1971 General Elections] (in Indonesian), Jakarta
- General Elections Institution (1987), Buku Pelengkap IX Pemilihan Umum 1987: Ringkasan Riwayat Hidup dan Riwayat Perjuangan Anggota Majelis Permusyawaratan Rakyat [Supplement IX of the 1987 General Elections: Summary of Biography and Battle Records of the Members of the People's Consultative Assembly] (in Indonesian), Jakarta
- Asril, Sutan Zaili; Mulyadi; Jamil, Taufik Ikram; Kawi, Muslim; Lubis, Ramli; Jabbar, Fakhrunnas MA (2002), Peristiwa 2 September 1985: Tragedi Riau Menegakkan Demokrasi [2 September 1985 Incident: Riau's Tragedy of Upholding Democracy] (in Indonesian), Pekanbaru
- Tuk Wan Haria, Muhammad (2006), Gubernur Sumatera dan Para Gubernur Sumatera Utara [Governor of Sumatra and Governors of North Sumatra] (in Indonesian), Medan: Library and Regional Archives Bureau of North Sumatra, ISBN 9789791521208
- Tim Penyusun (2007), DPRD Riau dari Masa ke Masa [Regional People's Representative Council of Riau from Time to Time] (in Indonesian), Pekanbaru: Regional People's Representative Council of Riau
- Sutjiatiningsih, Sri; Winoto, Gatot (1999), Kepulauan Riau pada Masa Dollar [Riau Islands During the Dollar Era] (in Indonesian), Jakarta: Ministry of Education and Culture, ISBN 9789799335081
- Lumbangaol, Humuntar (1986), "Operasi Khusus Terpadu Maduma", Jubileum 125 Tahun HKBP (1861-1986) (in Indonesian)
- Rosidi, Ajip (2008), Hidup Tanpa Ijazah [Life Without a Diploma] (in Indonesian), Pustaka Jaya, ISBN 9789794195475
- Rab, Tabrani (2002), Tempias: kilas balik kritik Prof. Dr. H. Tabrani Rab, 1998-2001 [Tempias: Flashbacks of Criticism from Prof. Dr. H. Tabrani Rab, 1998-2001] (in Indonesian), Alumni, ISBN 9789794142837
