= 7th Fighter Aviation Division =

- 中国人民解放军空军航空兵第七师
- Founded: September 1950
- Country: China
- Allegiance: Chinese Communist Party
- Branch: People's Liberation Army Air Force
- Type: Fighter Wing
- Part of: Central Theater Command
- Air Base: Zhangjiakou Air Base

Aircraft flown
- Fighter: Chengdu J-7; Shenyang J-11

The 7th Fighter Aviation Division is a unit of the Chinese People's Liberation Army Air Force. It is headquartered at Zhangjiakou Air Base in the Beijing Military Region. The unit is equipped with the Chengdu J-7 and Shenyang J-11 fighters. PLA-AF fighter divisions generally consist of about 17,000 personnel and 70-120 aircraft.

It was originally formed in September 1950 at Dongfeng, Jilin Province, as a fighter unit with the 19th and 21st Regiments.

It was assigned soon after formation to the air force component of the Chinese People's Volunteers as a mixed MiG-9/MiG-15 fighter unit. It did not enter combat in Korea and returned to Northern China in November 1951.

== Bibliography ==
- Hu, Guang Zheng (胡光正); Ma, Shan Ying (马善营) (1987), Chinese People's Volunteer Army Order of Battle (中国人民志愿军序列) (in Chinese), Beijing: Chinese People's Liberation Army Publishing House, OCLC 298945765
- Zhang, Xiao Ming (2004), Red Wings Over the Yalu: China, the Soviet Union, and the Air War in Korea, College Station, TX: Texas A&M University Press, ISBN 1-58544-201-1
