= 7th Panzer Division (Bundeswehr) =

Coordinates: 51.247357°N 6.818819°E

- German: 7. Panzerdivision
- Formation sign
- Active: 1 August 1958 – 30 June 2006
- Country: Germany
- Branch: Bundeswehr; German Army
- Headquarters: Düsseldorf
- Nicknames: Westphalian Panzer Division (Ger.: Westfälische Panzerdivision)

Commanders
- Last GOC: Generalmajor Wolf-Joachim Clauß

The 7th Panzer Division or Westphalian Panzer Division (German: 7. Panzerdivision or Westfälische Panzerdivision) was a major formation in the German Army (Heer) within the German Armed Forces or Bundeswehr whose headquarters was for many years in Lippstadt und Unna and, finally in Düsseldorf. Until its dissolution in 2006 it was seen as the "backbone of the Army" or the "spearhead of the German Army". The majority of new weapon systems were introduced by this formation. Many Inspectors of the Army (Inspekteur des Heeres) were once divisional commanders of the 7th Armoured Division. Its last commander was Wolf-Joachim Clauß.

It was the only division in the Northern Army Group without a forward defence sector in line against a projected Warsaw Pact attack. It was the only immediately available reserve division.
