= Kodam I/Bukit Barisan =

I Military Regional Command/Bukit Barisan
- Komando Daerah Militer I/Bukit Barisan
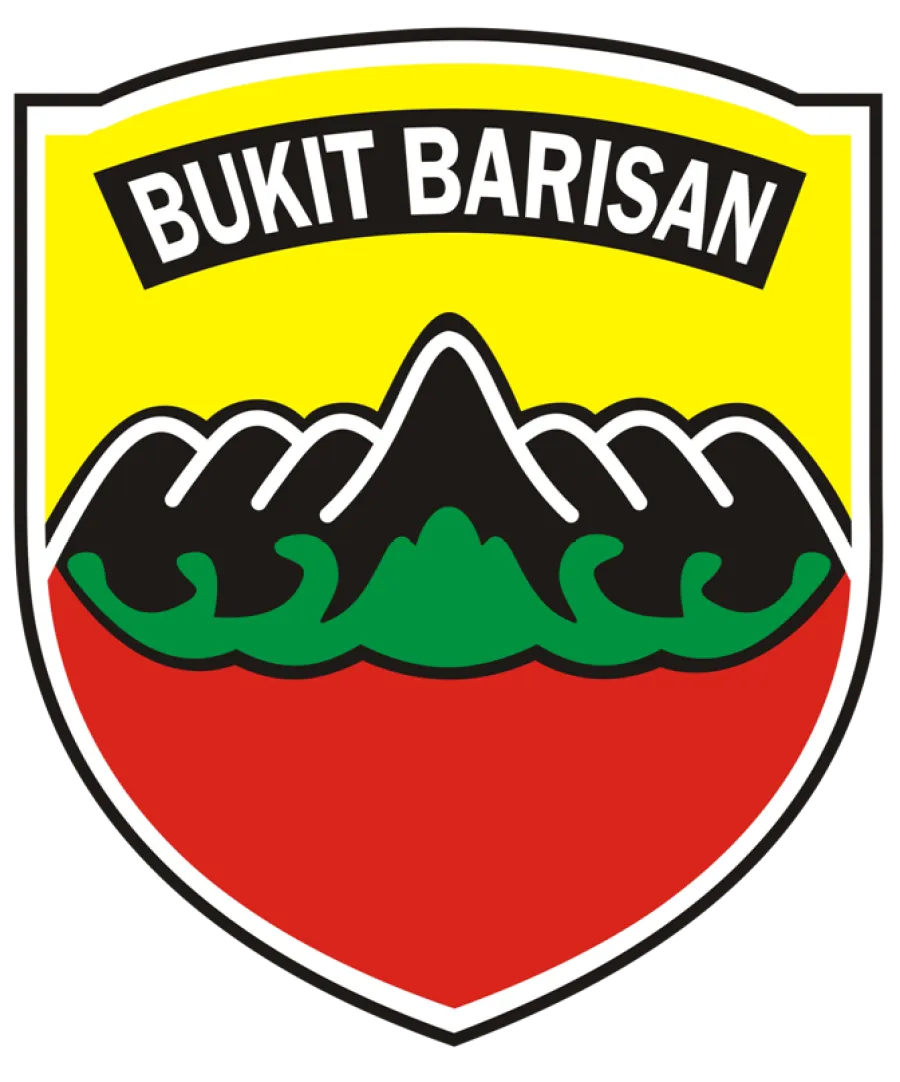
- Coat of Arms Kodam I/Bukit Barisan
- Active: 20 June 1950 – present
- Country: Indonesia
- Branch: Indonesian National Armed Forces Tentara Nasional Indonesia (Indonesian)
- Type: Indonesia Regional Military Command
- Part of: Indonesian Army
- Garrison/HQ: Medan, North Sumatra
- Mottos: Patah Tumbuh Hilang Berganti (Malay Proverb) "There will be a replacement for everything"
- March: Mars Bukit Barisan

Commanders
- Commander: Maj.Gen. Hendy Antariksa
- Chief of Staff: Brig.Gen. Dekki Pattinaya

Military Regional Command I/Bukit Barisan (Indonesian: Komando Daerah Militer I Bukit Barisan/Kodam I Bukit Barisan) is an Indonesian Army Regional Military Command that covers the Sumatran province of North Sumatra. The command takes its name from the Barisan Mountains.

Its Command Day is marked annually on 20 June, the date of the reformation of the basis of the command, the 1st Territorial Army Bukit Barisan (Komando Tentara Teritorium-I/Bukit Barisan), whose origins date to a Chief of Staff of the Army decision dated 13 December 1949.

== Territorial Units ==
- Kodim 0201/Medan (self-supporting), based in Medan
- Korem 022/Pantai Timur, based in Pematangsiantar
  - Kodim 0203/Langkat
  - Kodim 0204/Deli Serdang
  - Kodim 0207/Simalungun
  - Kodim 0208/Asahan
  - Kodim 0209/Labuhan Batu
- Korem 023/Kawal Samudra, based in Sibolga
  - Kodim 0205/Tanah Karo
  - Kodim 0206/Dairi
  - Kodim 0210/North Tapanuli
  - Kodim 0211/Central Tapanuli
  - Kodim 0212/South Tapanuli
  - Kodim 0213/Nias
- 1st Main Regiment (Rindam I/Bukit Barisan)
  - Regiment HQ
  - NCO School
  - Basic Combat Training Center
  - National Defense Training Command
  - Specialist Training School
  - Enlisted Personnel Training Unit

== Combat Units & Combat Support Units ==
- Combat Units
  - 7th Infantry Brigade/Rimba Raya
    - Brigade HQ
    - 122nd Infantry Battalion/Tombak Sakti
    - 125th Infantry Battalion/Simbisa
    - 126th Infantry Battalion/Kala Cakti
  - 100th Raider Infantry Battalion/Prajurit Setia
  - 121st Mechanized Infantry Battalion/Macan Kumbang
  - 123rd Infantry Battalion/Rajawali, under the command of Korem 023/Kawal Samudra
- Combat Support Units
  - 2nd Field Artillery Battalion/Kilap Sumagan
  - 2nd Air Defense Artillery Regiment/Sisingamangaraja
    - Regiment HQ and HQ Battery
    - 11th Air Defense Artillery Battalion/Wira Bhuana Yudha
    - 13th Air Defense Artillery Battalion/Parigha Bhuana Yudha
    - 004th Air Defense Artillery Detachment/Wira Satya Bhuana Yudha
  - 6th Cavalry Battalion/Naga Karimata
  - 6th Cavalry Company/Rajawali Bhakti Tama
  - 1st Combat Engineering Battalion/Dhira Dharma
  - 2nd Combat Engineering Detachment/Prasada Sakti

== Support Units ==
- Construction Engineer detachment (Zidam I/BB)
- Military Police detachment (Pomdam I/BB)
- Supply and Transport detachment (Bekangdam I/BB)
- Communication detachment (Hubdam I/BB)
- Ordnance detachment (Paldam I/BB)
- Intelligence detachment (Inteldam I/BB)
- Information detachment (Pendam I/BB)
- Adjutant General's detachment (Anjendam I/BB)
- Physical Training detachment (Jasdam I/BB)
- Medical detachment (Kesdam I/BB)
- Topography detachment (Topdam I/BB)
- Chaplain detachment (Bintaldam I/BB)
- Finance detachment (Kudam I/BB)
- Judge Advocate General detachment (Kumdam I/BB)
