= 7 Squadron =

7 Squadron or 7th Squadron may refer to:

- No. 7 Squadron RAAF, a unit of the Royal Australian Air Force
- No. 7 Squadron, Indian Air Force
- No. 7 Squadron RNZAF, a unit of the Royal New Zealand Air Force
- No. 7 Squadron PAF, Pakistan Air Force
- 7 Squadron SAAF, a unit of the South African Air Force
- No. 7 Squadron RAF, a unit of the United Kingdom Royal Air Force
- 7th Squadron (JASDF), a unit of the Japan Air Self-Defense Force
- 7th Tactical Squadron, Polish Air Force
- 7th Cruiser Squadron (United Kingdom), a blockading force of the Royal Navy during the World War I
- 7th Squadron, Rhode Island Cavalry, a unit of the Union Army during the American Civil War
- 7th Observation Squadron, later 7th Reconnaissance Squadron, United States Army Air Force; see 303d Tactical Reconnaissance Squadron
- 7th Aero Squadron, later 7th Observation Squadron, later 7th Reconnaissance Squadron, United States Army Air Force; see 397th Bombardment Squadron

== United States Air Force ==
- 7th Airlift Squadron
- 7th Air Refueling Squadron
- 7th Bombardment Squadron
- 7th Expeditionary Airborne Command and Control Squadron
- 7th Fighter Squadron
- 7th Intelligence Squadron
- 7th Reconnaissance Squadron; see 397th Bombardment Squadron
- 7th Tactical Reconnaissance Squadron
- 7th Photographic Reconnaissance Squadron
- 7th Space Operations Squadron
- 7th Space Warning Squadron
- 7th Special Operations Squadron
- 7th Weather Squadron
