= 7th Brigade =

7th Brigade may refer to:

== Australia ==
- 7th Brigade (Australia)

== Belgium ==
- 7th Brigade (Belgium)

== Bosnia and Herzegovina ==
- 7th Muslim Brigade

== Canada ==
- 7th Canadian Infantry Brigade

== China ==
- 7th Armored Brigade (People's Republic of China)
- 7th Marine Brigade (PLA Navy Marine Corps)

== Croatia ==
- 7th Guards Brigade (Croatia)

== Czech Republic ==
- 7th Mechanized Brigade (Czech Republic)

== France ==
- 7th Armoured Brigade (France)

== Greece ==
- 7th Mechanized Infantry Brigade (Greece)

== India ==
- 7th Indian Brigade
- 7th Indian Infantry Brigade, in the Second World War
- 7th (Ferozepore) Brigade, in the First World War
- 7th Indian Cavalry Brigade, in the First World War

== Indonesia ==
- 7th Infantry Brigade (Indonesia)

== Israel ==
- 7th Armored Brigade (Israel)

== Lebanon ==
- 7th Infantry Brigade (Lebanon)

== Poland ==
- 7th Coastal Defense Brigade

== Russia ==
- 7th Separate Guards Motor Rifle Brigade
- 7th Separate Guards Tank Brigade (Russia)

== South Africa ==
- 7th South African Infantry Brigade

== South Korea ==
- 7th Infantry Brigade (South Korea)

== South Vietnam ==
- 7th Airborne Brigade

== Sweden ==
- South Skåne Brigade

== Tajikistan ==
- 7th Airborne Assault Brigade

== Ukraine ==
- 7th Special Purpose Brigade
- 7th Tactical Aviation Brigade

== United Kingdom ==
- 7th Armoured Brigade (United Kingdom)
- 7th Cavalry Brigade (United Kingdom)
- 7th Cyclist Brigade
- 7th Infantry Brigade (United Kingdom)
- 7th Light Mechanised Brigade (United Kingdom)
- 7th Motor Brigade (United Kingdom)
- 7th Mounted Brigade (United Kingdom)
- 7th Provisional Brigade (United Kingdom)
- 7th Reserve Brigade
- 7th Support Group (United Kingdom)

=== Artillery units ===
- 7th Brigade Royal Field Artillery; see 2nd (Rawalpindi) Division
- 7th Brigade, North Irish Division, Royal Artillery
- 7th Brigade, South Irish Division, Royal Artillery
- 7th County of London Brigade, Royal Field Artillery
- 7th (Hampshire) Army Brigade, Royal Field Artillery
- 7th (Cornwall and Warwickshire) Medium Brigade, Royal Garrison Artillery
- VII Brigade, Royal Horse Artillery

== United States ==
- 7th Cavalry Brigade (United States)
- 7th Engineer Brigade (United States)
- 7th Medical Brigade
- 7th Reserve Officers' Training Corps Brigade
- 7th Signal Brigade (United States)
- 7th Transportation Brigade (United States)

== See also ==
- 7th Division (disambiguation)
- 7th Regiment (disambiguation)
