= Memet Rochamat =

Indonesian bureaucrat

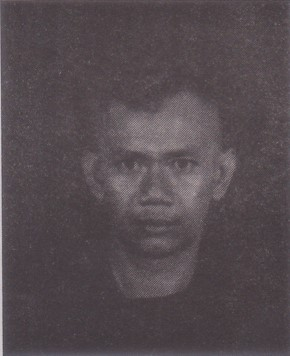
- Memet in 1989

Regional Secretary of Bekasi
- In office 1999–2003
- Preceded by: Adang Bachtiar
- Succeeded by: Herry Koesaeri

Personal details
- Born: 1953 – 1954 Cibingbin, Kuningan, West Java, Indonesia
- Died: 21 June 2010 (age 56) Bekasi, West Java, Indonesia

Memet Rochamat (1953/1954 – 21 June 2010) was an Indonesian bureaucrat. He spent most of his career in the Bekasi, with his final position as the regional secretary from 1999 to 2003. He was then transferred to the Ministry of State Apparatus Utilization and Bureaucratic Reform, where he lost two times for the bid as the regent of Bekasi. On 21 June 2010, Memet committed suicide by hanging himself.

== Education and career ==
Memet was born between 1953 and 1954 at the Cibingbin village in Kuningan. He studied at the Home Affairs Governance Academy and the Institute of Governance Sciences. He spent most of his career as civil servant in Bekasi, beginning as the chief of West Bekasi district and North Bekasi district. He was then recalled to serve in the Bekasi regional government as the chief of regional revenue. During his tenure, Bekasi received the Adi Karya Mukti Wibawa trophy from the provincial government as the regency with the highest rate of property tax payment. He then became the assistant for economy and development to the regional secretary.

Memet was promoted to become the regional secretary of Bekasi in 1999, under regent Wikanda Darmawijaya. He held this position until 2003 and was transferred to the Ministry of State Apparatus Utilization and Bureaucratic Reform as the assistant deputy for accountability. In early 2006, Memet was nominated as the acting regent of Bekasi, alongside his successor as regional secretary Herry Koesaeri and Chief of the Purwakarta Regional Coordinating Board Tenny Wishramwan. Memet was nominated with the support of the Golkar Party in Bekasi's local council. He lost the bid to Tenny Wishramwan.

Memet ran once again for the position in the 2007 Bekasi regency election. He picked Jejen Sayuti, a politician from the Indonesian Democratic Party of Struggle (PDIP), as his running mate. During his candidacy, Memet bought seventy Yamaha RX King motors for foremans and several cars for chief foremans in Bekasi. Despite his efforts, Memet placed second in the election, with 144,181 votes, and lost to Sa'duddin. Angry PDIP supporters then stormed the regional election commission building, and the pair disputed the results in the supreme court. Memet reportedly spent two billion for the legal process and paid 500 million rupiahs for his lawyers. At the end of his campaign, Memet left behind a debt of Rp40 billion. Memet sold shares in housing and PT Maruta Bumi Putera, but it was still insufficient to settle his debts.

== Death ==
On 21 June 2010, Memet was found dead by a family member at his child's room in his house. Memet was found hanged at the bathroom with a white cable tied around his neck. The chief of criminal service of Bekasi police, Ade Ary Syam Indradi, stated that Memet's body was found with his tongue protruding and signs of sperm and feces release.

His body was immediately brought to the Bekasi regional hospital. Upon further investigation, no signs of violence or foul play were found on the body or at the scene, leading authorities to conclude it was a case of suicide. His body was immediately brought to his birthplace in Cibingbin, Kuningan, where he was buried at the village's public cemetery. Several Bekasi and Kuningan officials, such as Regent of Bekasi Sa'duddin, Mayor of Bekasi Mochtar Mohamad, former regent Suko Martono, Deputy Regent of Kuningan Momon Rochmana, delivered their condolences.

== Personal life ==
Memet was married to Wiwi and had three daughters.
