= 2007 Bekasi regency election =

← 2003	11 March 2007	2012 →
- Turnout: 53.76%
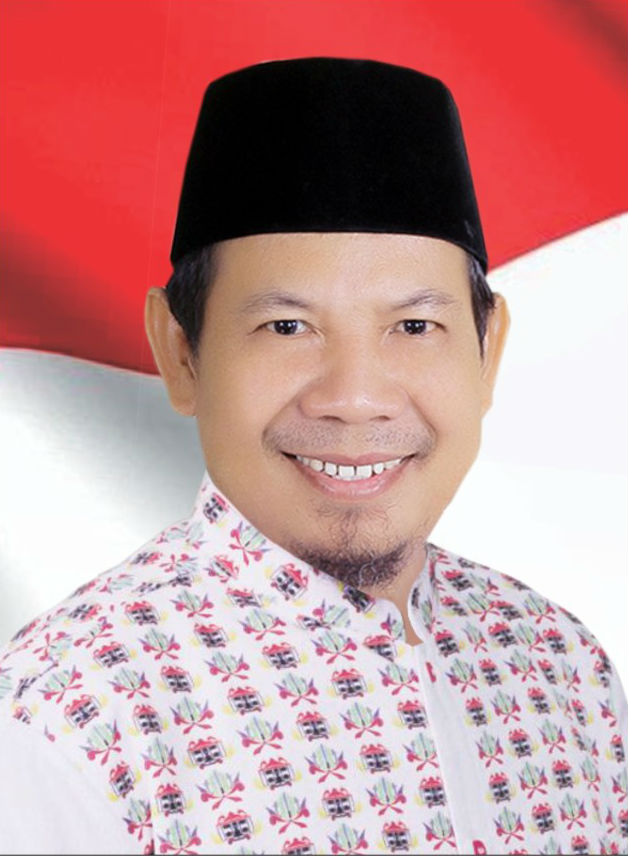

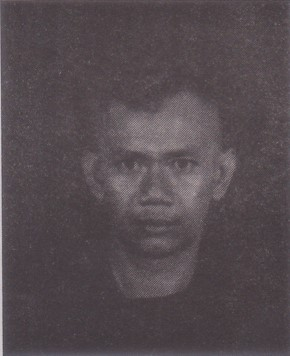
Candidate	Sa'duddin	Memet Rochamat
Party	PKS	PDI-P
Running mate	Darip Mulyana	Jejen Sayuti
Popular vote	195,857	144,181
Percentage	25.05%	18.44%
Regent before election
Herry Koesaeri (acting)
Elected Regent
Sa'duddin
PKS

The 2007 Bekasi regency election was held on 11 March 2007 to elect the regent of Bekasi to a five-year term. Former Bekasi regent Saleh Manaf and Wikanda Darmawijaya ran for a second term. The election was won by speaker of Bekasi Regional People's Representative Council Sa'duddin and former expert staff to Bekasi regent, Darip Mulyana.

== Background ==
On 21 January 2004, former chief of Bekasi land agency Saleh Manaf was installed as the Regent of Bekasi following an unexpected victory in an internal election held by Bekasi Regional People's Representative Council. Two years later, he was deposed from his position after a successful legal challenge from his predecessor, Wikanda Darmawijaya, who claimed that Saleh failed to obtain his permission to run for election. Saleh's removal from office triggered an election to fill the position.

The election was the first direct regency election in Bekasi since the introduction of the 2005 local election law.

== Candidates ==
This election was contested by six candidates together with their running mate.

#	Candidate	Running mate	Parties
1	Sa'duddin; Speaker of Bekasi Regional People's Representative Council (2004 – 2007)	Darip Mulyana; Expert Staff to the Regent of Bekasi	Prosperous Justice Party
2	Saleh Manaf; Regent of Bekasi (2004 – 2006)	Omin Basuki	United Development Party
3	Memet Rochamat; Regional Secretary of Bekasi (1999 – 2003)	Jejen Sayuti; Member of Bekasi Regional People's Representative Council (2004 – 2009)	Indonesian Democratic Party of Struggle
4	Wikanda Darmawijaya; Regent of Bekasi (1998 – 2004)	Daeng Muhammad; Member of Bekasi Regional People's Representative Council (2004 – 2009)	National Mandate Party
5	Nachrowi Solihin; Member of Bekasi Regional People's Representative Council (2004 – 2009)	Solihin Sari; Vice Regent of Bekasi (2004 – 2006)	Golkar
6	Munawar Fuad; Special Staff to the Minister of Communication and Informatics	Adhy Firdaus	Democratic Party; National Awakening Party

== Debate and election day ==
Debates for the regency election was held on 1 March, with all six pairs attending the debate. The debate was moderated by communication expert Effendi Ghazali, with panelists including Anies Baswedan, Denny Indrayana, and Hadar Gumay.

During the debate, the candidates faced criticism during a debate for starting late and having high-level, non-specific programs. The debate mostly focused on economic equality, investment support, poverty alleviation, public service improvement, employment, and affordable education.

Elections were held simultaneously all over Bekasi on 11 March 2007, with polling stations opening at 7 AM. The police chief of Bekasi deployed 3,100 personnels to secure the election.

== Results ==
The final results of the regency election were announced in a plenary session of the electoral commission on 16 March. The electoral desk of the Bekasi's regency office and the Sa'duddin-Darip team pair announced their own quick counts, with results similar to the final count. The final vote count process by the electoral commission were marred with protests from the losing candidates, with demands to stop the count.

Sa'duddin and Darip Mulyana were declared as winners of the election, securing a majority in 15 out of 23 subdistricts in Bekasi. The pair also won a significant majority in densely populated subdistricts such as Cibitung, South Tambun, and North Tambun.

Candidate	Running mate	Party	Votes	%
Sa'duddin	Darip Mulyana	Prosperous Justice Party	195,857	25.05
Wikanda Darmawijaya	Daeng Muhammad	National Mandate Party	87,313	11.17
Saleh Manaf	Omin Basuki	United Development Party	143,248	18.32
Memet Rochamat	Jejen Sayuti	Indonesian Democratic Party of Struggle	144,181	18.44
Nachrowi Solihin	Solihin Sari	Golongan Karya	113,058	14.46
Munawar Fuad	Adhy Firdaus	Democratic Party-National Awakening Party	98,080	12.55
Total			781,737	100.00
Valid votes			781,737	99.28
Invalid/blank votes			5,673	0.72
Total votes			787,410	100.00
Registered voters/turnout			1,459,369	53.96
Source: Kompas (2007), General Elections Commission

== Aftermath ==
After the results were announced, the electoral commission handed over the results to the Bekasi Regional People's Representative Council on 23 March. A legal challenge was later filed by the campaign team of Memet Rochamat-Jejen Sayuti, alleging irregularities in the vote counting process. However, the case was rejected by the court due to a lack of evidence. Sa'duddin-Darip was installed as regent and vice regent of Bekasi on 14 May 2007.

The election process costed the Bekasi government an estimated 21,2 billion rupiahs.
