= Sukat Subandi =

Indonesian military officer

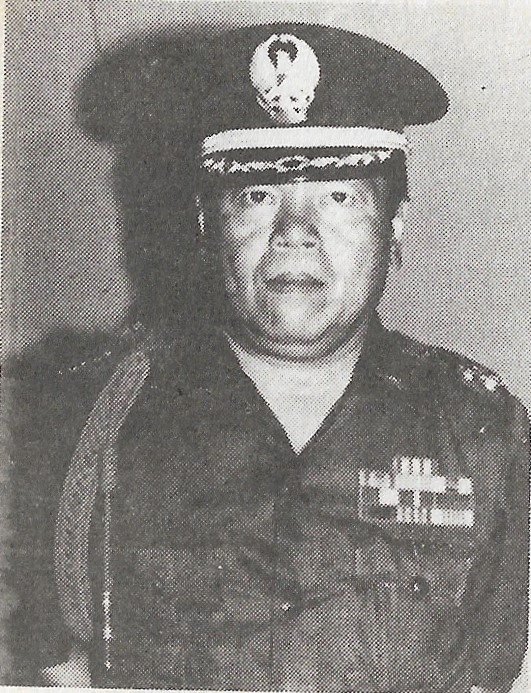

Regent of Bekasi
- In office 1967 – 9 November 1973
- Governor: Mashudi; Solihin G.P.
- Preceded by: Maun
- Succeeded by: Abdul Fatah

Personal details
- Born: May 19, 1926
- Died: November 17, 1985 (aged 59)

Military service
- Allegiance: Indonesia
- Branch/service: Indonesian Army
- Rank: Colonel
- Unit: Infantry

M. Sukat Subandi (19 May 1926 – 17 November 1985) was an Indonesian military officer who served as the Regent of Bekasi from 1967 to 1973. Sukat spent most of his career in the Siliwangi (West Java) Regional Military Command and was the commander of the Majalengka military district from April to September 1962 with the rank of captain. As a lieutenant colonel, Sukat was transferred to the Jakarta Regional Military Command as the commander of the Bekasi military district. He was replaced from the position in July 1966.

In 1967, Subandi was assigned to civilian office as the regent of Bekasi. During his six-year rule, Subandi oversaw the development of Bekasi's agriculture. He instructed historians to trace back Bekasi's history, which resulted in a book on Bekasi's history, and ordered the construction of a monument to commemorate Bekasi's heroes in 1971.

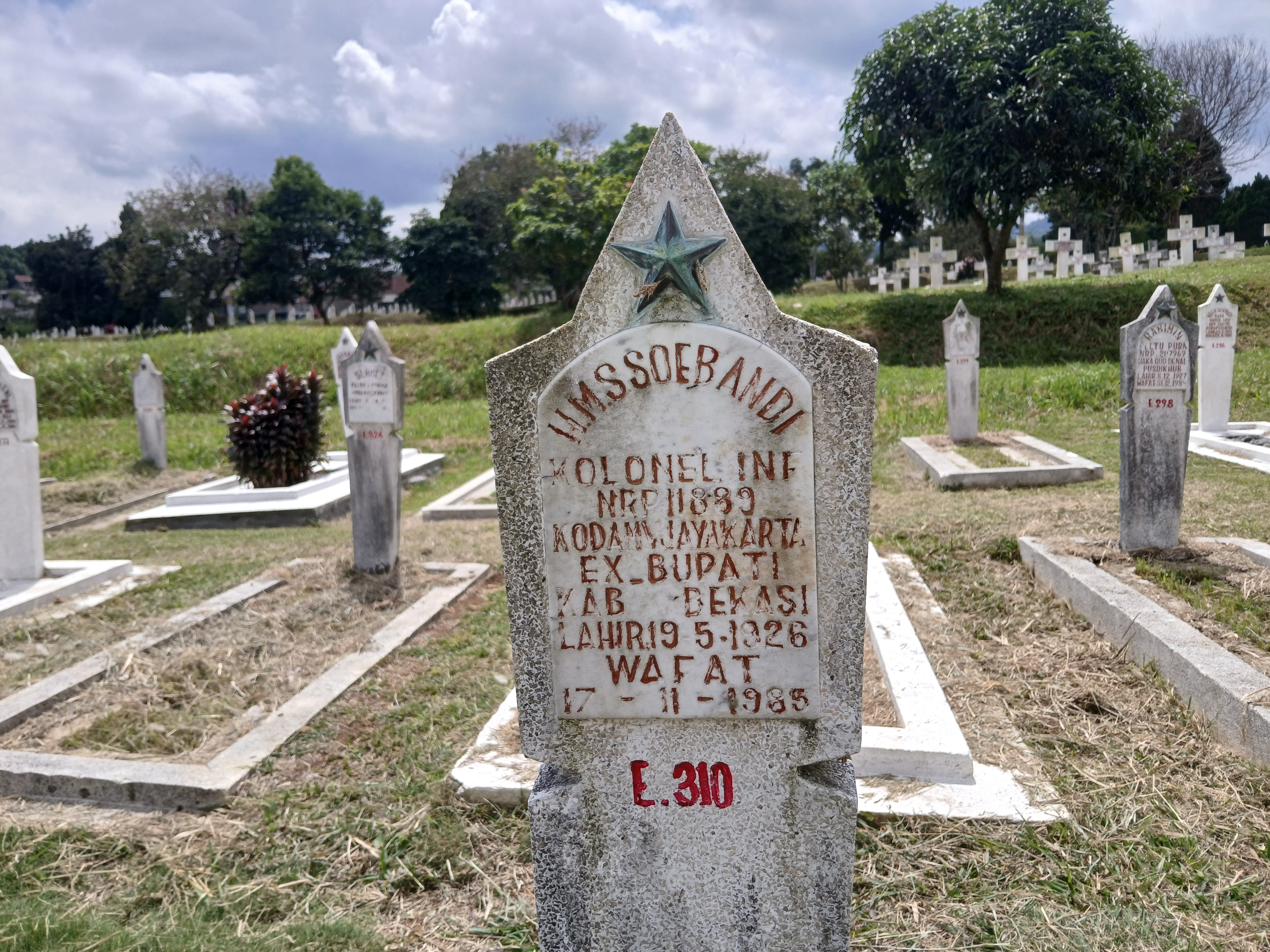
Sukat Subandi's gravestone at the Cikutra Hero Cemetery

Subandi was replaced from his office on 9 November 1973. He returned to the military with the rank of colonel and was appointed as the inspector of the Jakarta Regional Military Command. On 14 October 1978, Subandi became a member of the Jakarta Regional House of Representatives, representing the armed forces. He died on 17 November 1985 and was buried at the Cikutra Heroes' Cemetery in Bandung.
