= Abdul Fatah (regent) =

Indonesian politician and army officer (1925 – 2010)

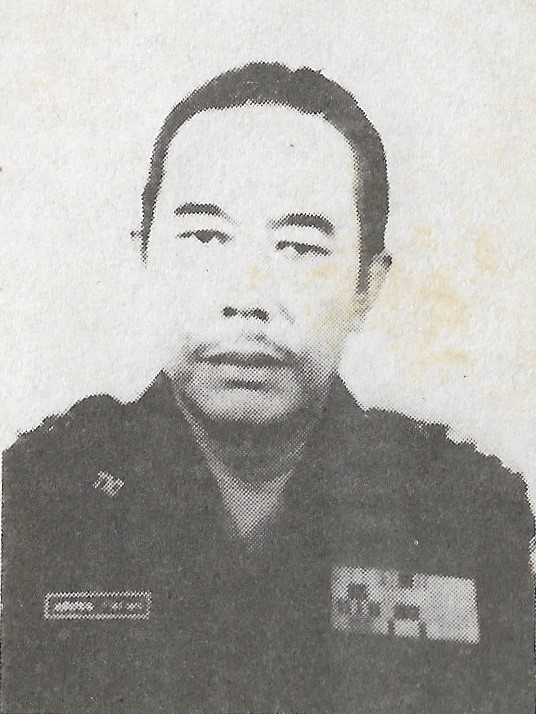

Regent of Bekasi
- In office 1 April 1973 – 9 November 1983
- Governor: Solihin G. P. Aang Kunaefi
- Preceded by: Sukat Subandi
- Succeeded by: Suko Martono

Personal details
- Born: May 25, 1925 Bandung, Dutch East Indies
- Died: July 30, 2010 (aged 85) Menteng, Central Jakarta, Indonesia
- Resting place: Kalibata Heroes' Cemetery
- Party: Golkar

Military service
- Allegiance: Indonesia
- Branch/service: Indonesian Army
- Rank: Colonel
- Unit: Infantry

Abdul Fatah (25 May 1925 – 30 July 2010; sometimes written as Abdul Patah or Abdulpatah) was an Indonesian military officer and politician. He was the regent of Bekasi from 1973 until 1983.

== Early life and military career ==
Abdul Fatah was born in Bandung on 25 May 1925. He was born as the son of H. Abdul Halim dan Hj. Halimah, who both worked as a trader. Abdul Fatah joined the military while he was in high school, during the Japanese occupation of the Dutch East Indies. Following the independence, Abdul Fatah joined the Indonesian Army. He attended officer school at Cimahi and was assigned to Subang and Sukabumi. In the 1960s, Abdul Fatah was reassigned to the Jakarta Regional Military Command, where he became the commander of Central Jakarta military district from 1967 to 1971 and assistant for personnel affairs to the commander of the Jakarta Regional Military Command.

== Regent of Bekasi ==
Abdul Fatah became the regent of Bekasi on 1 April 1973. He was nominated for a second term in August 1978 and was installed on 9 November 1978 to serve until 1983. At the start of his first term, Abdul Fatah designed the masterplan for Bekasi's development with the help of experts from the Bandung Institute of Technology and the Padjadjaran University. Abdul also sought advice from local clerics, such as Kyai Noer Alie. The masterplan included infrastructure development like Kalimalang Road and Bekasi-Cikarang alternative route, as well as economic initiatives such as the establishment of people's markets in various spots in Bekasi and providing subsidies to local market vendors. Abdul also established a sports center in the Bekasi central stadium and an integrated government office for the Bekasi regency. A year before the end of his term, Abdul Fatah moved Bekasi's government office to the more central Ahmad Yani Street in order to improve public service.

Aside from improving Bekasi's main roads, Abdul Fatah also began building connecting roads between subdistricts in Bekasi and improved the quality of preexisting roads. Abdul also constructed the Jatiluhur reservoir technical irrigation and built the CBL (Cikarang Bekasi Laut) waste channel to prevent droughts from occurring during the dry season and floods during the rainy season. Bekasi also underwent a massive industrialization program during this period, as the agrarian Cikarang, Cibitung dan Lemahabang subdistricts were transformed to an industrial area. These industrial areas in Bekasi underwent a massive growth following the construction of the Jakarta–Cikampek Toll Road. In regional administration, Abdul Fatah reorganized sub-districts and villages in Bekasi in 1976, resulting in an increase of subdistricts from 13 to 20 and the number of villages from 95 to 218.

A key aspect of the plan was the establishment of educational facilities, emphasizing the advancement of Islamic education. On 12 April 1982, Abdul established the 45 Islamic Education Foundation, which gave birth to the Village Development Academy. The academy used the Tambun Juang Building, which was formerly a parliamentary building and political prison. Political scientist Taliziduhu Ndraha was appointed as the academy's first director, and the academy commenced its operations on 20 June. Several other colleges were later established by the foundation, and these colleges were later merged to form the 45 Bekasi Islamic University in 1987. Abdul Fatah also oversaw a massive increase of the amount of primary and junior high school in villages in Bekasi and the construction of the Bekasi People's Struggle Monument in 1975.

== Later life ==
After retiring from the military and government, in 1994 Abdul Fatah was awarded the title of Bekasi's Main Citizen by the regional government. Abdul continued to gave support to the documentation of Bekasi's regional history. His support resulted in two history books on Bekasi, Produk Sejarah Jilid I and Sejarah Perkembangan Bekasi dan Perkembangan Kebudayaan Bekasi. For his efforts in preserving Bekasi's history, Abdul received an award from the Youth, Sports, Culture and Tourism of Bekasi City in 2009.

Abdul died at his house in Menteng, Central Jakarta, on 30 July 2010. He was buried the next day at the Kalibata Heroes' Cemetery.
