= Saleh Manaf =

Indonesian politician (born 1950)

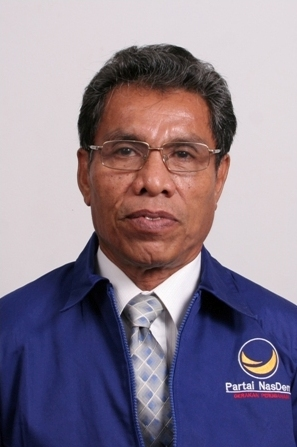
- Saleh Manaf in 2013

Regent of Bekasi
- In office 21 January 2004 – 16 February 2006
- Governor: Danny Setiawan
- Preceded by: Wikanda Darmawijaya
- Succeeded by: Herry Koesaeri (acting); Tenny Wishramwan (acting); Herry Koesaeri (acting); Sa'duddin

Personal details
- Born: September 18, 1950 (age 75) Meulaboh, North Sumatra, Indonesia
- Spouse: Cut Rosma
- Relations: Neneng Hassanah Yasin (daughter-in-law)
- Children: 7, including Almaida Rosa Putra
- Education: Agrarian Academy; Governance Sciences Institute

Saleh Manaf (born 18 September 1950) is an Indonesian politician and bureaucrat. He began his career as a civil servant at the National Land Agency and held various positions in North Aceh, North Sumatra, and Bekasi. In 2003, he was unexpectedly elected as the regent of Bekasi, defeating the incumbent and other candidates. His tenure was marked by environmental issues, including illegal dumping and flood management. However, his term was cut short in 2006 due to allegations of election irregularities and subsequent legal battles, leading to his dismissal.

After his dismissal, Saleh Manaf ran unsuccessfully for vice governor of Aceh in 2006 and for regent of Bekasi in 2007. He also made several attempts to secure a seat in the House of Representatives from West Java VII, representing different political parties in the 2009, 2014, 2019, and 2024 legislative elections, but was unsuccessful each time. Saleh's son, Almaida Rosa Putra, is currently a member of the West Java Regional Representative Council.

== Education and bureaucratic career ==
Saleh Manaf was born on 18 September 1950 in Meulaboh. He spent most of his childhood in the city, where he completed his elementary school, junior high school, and high school. Upon completing high school in 1970, Saleh studied at the Agrarian Academy in Semarang until he received a diploma in 1975. He continued his studies at the Governance Sciences Institute and received a bachelor's degree in 1984. Throughout his career in the government, Saleh attended a course on management in 1990, recovery program in 1992, land administration in 1995, and higher leadership course in 2001.

Saleh was assigned to the North Aceh land office shortly upon graduation. He began his career as chief of land registration before becoming the head of the land office in 1989. He was transferred to North Sumatra land office in 1995 as chief of land measurement and registration. From North Sumatra, Saleh was transferred to Bekasi as the head of the regency's land office in 1998.

== Regent of Bekasi ==
=== Election ===
In 2003, Saleh Manaf, along with Solihin Sari, was nominated for the position of regent and deputy regent of Bekasi. The pair was unfavored to win the election, with the majority of Bekasi council members siding with either incumbent regent Wikanda Darmawijaya or council speaker Damanhuri Husein. Saleh was nominated by small parties inside the council, while Wikanda was supported Indonesian Democratic Party of Struggle (PDIP) and National Mandate Party, which altogether had around one-third of seats in the council.

Unexpectedly, at the election held on 4 November 2003, Saleh became an underdog as he won a majority of 24 out of 45 votes. Wikanda only received 11 votes and Damanhuri received 10. Nuradi, the election chief, who was also the leader of PDIP in Bekasi, attempted to annul the results, but to no avail as the government had already validated the results. Angry PDIP members then stormed houses of PDIP council members who allegedly diverted their votes to Saleh Manaf. Nuradi was investigated by the police for his involvement in the attack, for which he vehemently denied. Due to the riots, Wikanda's term was briefly extended for a month.

=== Separatist allegations ===
Saleh and Solihin were installed on 21 January 2004. Several days before he was installed, rumor spread that Saleh was affiliated to the Free Aceh Movement (GAM), a separatist movement in Aceh, and that he was brothers with former GAM commander Muzakir Manaf. Previously, Wikanda Darmawijaya sent a letter to the president and the army chief of staff with similar claims. The accusation was later disproved after investigation by the army intelligence service showed that most of Saleh's family member in Meulaboh worked as civil servants. The Bekasi military district commander, Benny Susianto, summoned the organization that spread the rumors for further clarification.

=== Tenure ===
Saleh's term as regent was marred with environmental issues. At the start of his term, Saleh cancelled several gas deals, which resulted in him being reported to the police by one of the affected companies. Around the same month, seven districts in Bekasi were flooded by rivers around the regency. At the end of 2004, Saleh sent a letter to the Ministry of Environment, urging them to handle the illegal dumping of iron waste in Bekasi.

Saleh also faced problems regarding trash management, where he was protested by his own local environment service after several dump truck dumped their trash illegally in local lands. Saleh then opened a new dumping ground in Burangkeng, but the site was closed after a while as the site was deemed too close to housing area. Saleh then rented three temporary sites as a substitute for the Burangkeng dumping ground, but these sites were shut down after a month and the Burangkeng dumping ground was reopened. Saleh later hired several consulting firms, including one from Switzerland, to resolve the issue.

=== Dismissal ===
A month after his inauguration, on 10 February 2004 Wikanda sued the Bekasi local council to the West Java administrative court for approving Saleh's election as regent. According to Wikanda, as he was the incumbent regent at the time of the election, he had not given permission for Wikanda—as the chief of the land office—to run for the office. Although his initial case was rejected, his lawsuit was granted after bringing the same case to the Jakarta administrative court on 12 May 2004. Saleh appealed to the Jakarta administrative court on 16 September 2004 and the appeal was accepted.

Upon being rejected by the Jakarta administrative court, Wikanda appealed to the Supreme Court of Indonesia in October. The supreme court accepted the appeal on 6 July 2005, deciding that there were irregularities in vote counting during the election. In August, hundreds of protesters claiming to be a part of the Bekasi People's Solidarity Union sealed Saleh's office, urging the Bekasi local council to dismiss Saleh as soon as possible. As a form of protest, the protesters put two goat heads, a femur, nails, shards, flowers and jugs in front of the office door. On 4 January 2006, the minister issued a decree revoking the appointment of Saleh as regent. Saleh was officially dismissed as regent on 16 February 2006, with regional secretary Herry Koesaeri as his temporary replacement.

Saleh held a press conference on 18 January, two weeks after the revocation was issued. Saleh argued that the minister acted erroneously by revoking his appointment. Saleh stated that as the supreme court decision focused on the legal flaws in the appointment procedure, not the election results, the minister should've issued a new decree for his appointment instead of ousting him from office. Saleh then filed a judicial review at the Constitutional Court of Indonesia, with Adnan Buyung Nasution as his lawyer. Nasution claimed that the minister's decree was legally flawed, as Saleh was not subordinate to the regent and therefore he has no need to seek permission. Saleh was instead a civil servant from the National Land Agency, and he had obtained permission from the agency's head. Saleh's judicial review was rejected by the constitutional court on 12 July 2006, with the constitutional court upholding the minister's revocation decree.

== Electoral career ==
=== Regent and gubernatorial election ===
Failing to secure his office, Saleh returned to Aceh. In Aceh, Saleh ran as the candidate for vice governor, with sports official Iskandar Hoesin as the gubernatorial candidate. The pair was supported by the Crescent Star Party and several non-parliamentary parties. A survey done by the Denny JA Agency several months before the election placed Hoesin and Saleh in the third-to-last place with 5.18 percent. At the election held on 11 December 2006, Hoesin and Saleh was in the fifth place with 111,553 votes, or 5.54 percent of the total votes.

Saleh decided to run again for the regent of Bekasi in 2007. Unlike his previous election where only Bekasi council members could vote, the 2007 election was a direct election. Saleh picked politician Omin Basyuni as his running mate. Saleh and Omin was endorsed by United Development Party, with the party mobilizing Islamic clerics to support the pair. Both Wikanda and Solihin also participated in this election. Saleh lost the election to Bekasi council speaker Sa'duddin. He was in the third place, with 143,248 of the votes.

=== Legislative election ===
Since 2009, Saleh has unsuccessfully run for a seat in the House of Representatives from West Java VII. Saleh ran from the Crescent Star Party in the 2009 and 2019 legislative election, the NasDem Party in the 2014 election, and most recently from the Prosperous Justice Party in the 2024 election.

== Personal life ==
Saleh is married to Cut Rosmah and has seven children. One of their children, Almaida Rosa Putra, is a member of the West Java Regional Representative Council and the husband of Neneng Hassanah Yasin, Bekasi's regent from 2012 to 2018.
