= Mochammad Djamhari =

Indonesian military officer (1943–2026)

Regent of Bekasi
- In office 9 November 1993 – 9 November 1998
- Governor: Nana Nuriana
- Preceded by: Suko Martono
- Succeeded by: Wikanda Darmawijaya

Personal details
- Born: 2 November 1943 Plaju, Palembang, Japanese-occupied Dutch East Indies
- Died: 12 January 2026 (aged 82) Bandung, Indonesia

Military service
- Allegiance: Indonesia
- Branch/service: Indonesian Army
- Years of service: 1967–1998
- Rank: Colonel
- Unit: Infantry

Mochammad Djamhari (2 November 1943 – 12 January 2026) was an Indonesian military officer who served as the Regent of Bekasi from 1993 to 1998.

== Early life and career ==
Djamhari was born on 2 November 1943 in Plaju, Palembang, the capital of South Sumatra. Upon completing high school in 1964, he underwent military education at the Indonesian Military Academy. He graduated from the academy in 1967, and was commissioned as an infantry first lieutenant. Upon completing the basic infantry course (kursus antar kecabangan, Susarbang) in 1968, he was assigned to the 412th infantry battalion in Purworejo as a platoon commander.

He attended advanced course for infantry officers (kursus lanjutan perwira infanteri, Suslapaif) in 1972 and the Indonesian Army Command and General Staff College (Seskoad) in 1983. Upon completing Seskoad, in 1984 Djamhari was assigned to the Bulukumba Regency as the commander of military district. He was appointed the chief of staff of the Santiago (North Sulawesi) Military Area in 1987 and assistant for territorial affairs in the Jakarta Regional Military Command in 1990.

== Regent of Bekasi ==
Djamhari, along with two other army officers and several bureaucrats, were nominated for the post. In the final election held by the Bekasi council on 9 October 1993, Djamhari faced bureaucrats Kailani AR and Nonon Sonthanie. Djamhari won the election with 31 out of 45 votes, while Kailani only received 8 votes and Nonon 6 votes. The speaker of Bekasi's council, Abdul Manan, described Djamhari's nomination as one of the smoothest, in comparison with the previous nominations. Djamhari was installed as the Regent of Bekasi on 9 November 1993.

Under his leadership, Bekasi continued the industrialization process that it had embarked upon. Djamhari proposed the concept of "back to village", as villages were the main power that allowed Bekasi to sustain the Jakarta metropolitan area. However, this proposal was overpowered by the ongoing industrialization process. He also oversaw the upgrade of the Bekasi administrative city, which was previously under the Bekasi regency, to a full autonomous city under the provincial government in 1996. The administrative mayor, Kailani A.R., was appointed the city's first mayor.

Djamhari was nicknamed as the "Regent with a One-Billion Swimming Pool" (Bupati Kolam Renang 1 Miliar) by Bekasi students.

Shortly after the fall of Suharto in May 1998, Djamhari asked to resign from his position by sending a letter to the governor of West Java and home affairs minister. He was the target of protests by the Bekasi Student Action Unity for Reform, who demanded his immediate resignation for his corruption, collusion, and nepotism, and for the Bekasi local council to issue a motion of no confidence. Djamhari and the council's speaker, Wikanda Darmawijaya, attempted to conduct dialogue with the students, but the two were forced to sit in the Bekasi council's courtyard. Djamhari was replaced by Wikanda on 9 November 1998.

== Death ==
Djamhari died in Bandung on 12 January 2026, at the age of 82.
