= Solichin Dachlan =

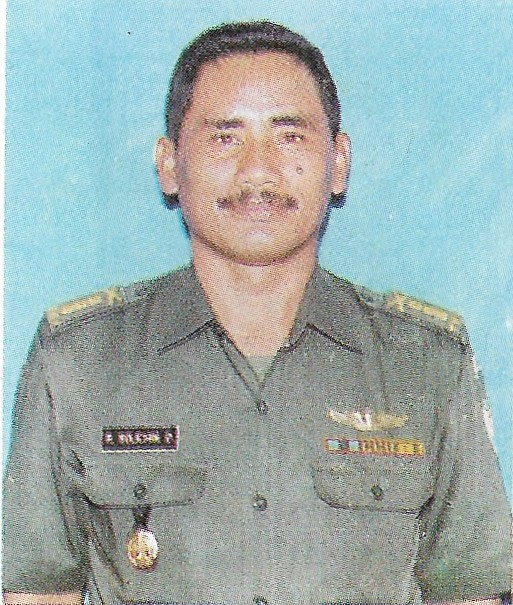

Regent of Serang
- In office 22 March 1998 – April 1999
- Governor: Nana Nuriana
- Preceded by: Sukron Roshadi
- Succeeded by: Nana Nuriana (acting)

Personal details
- Born: August 12, 1948 (age 77) Bogor, State of Pasundan
- Party: Golkar
- Spouse: Nanny Effendi
- Children: 3

Military service
- Allegiance: Indonesia
- Branch/service: Indonesian Army
- Years of service: 1972 – ?
- Rank: Colonel
- Unit: Infantry

Solichin Dachlan (born 12 August 1948) is an Indonesian military officer and politician who became the Regent of Serang from 1998 to 1999.

== Career ==
Solichin was born on 12 August 1948 in Cipayung, a village in the Bogor Regency, which at that time was part of the State of Pasundan. He graduated from the Indonesian Military Academy in 1972. He commanded the Siliwangi (West Java) Regional Military Command's battle training center while he was a lieutenant colonel sometime in early 1990s. He was then transferred to Kuningan, where he became the commander of the military district for several months in 1992. Afterwards, Solichin received a promotion to the rank of colonel and returned to the Siliwangi Regional Military Command as the chief of the regional functional group upbuilding body (Babinkar, Badan Pembinaan Kekaryaan).

On 27 May 1997, Solichin was installed as the commander of the Army Physical Education Center, replacing Asril Abdullah. Along with the inauguration, the center was reorganized from under the command of the directorate of adjutant general to the army doctrine, education, and training leadership command.

In December later that year, Solichin was named as a prospective candidate for the Regent of Serang. In the election held by Serang's Regional People's Representative Council on 14 February 1998, Solichin won 36 out of 45 votes, defeating local bureaucrats Ehat Mahatma and Nano Abdullah Dudaya. Solichin was installed on 22 March 1998 for a five-year term. Despite being appointed for a five-year term, Solichin was removed from his position in April 1999, with West Java's governor Nana Nuriana replacing him as acting regent.

During his fourteen months of becoming regent, Solichin instructed the cancellation of the construction of a three-billion-rupiah market in Anyer and the closure of nightclubs in Serang, the latter of which was responded by protests from nightclub owners and employees.

== Personal life ==
Solichin is married to Nanny Effendi and has three children.
