= Ahmad Nasuhi =

Indonesian former military officer

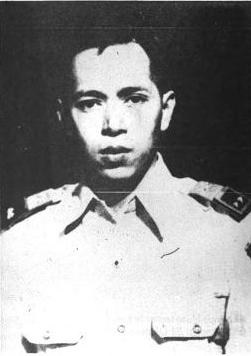
- Nasuhi as a lieutenant colonel

Vice Governor of West Java
- In office 25 November 1968 – 1973
- Governor: Mashudi; Solihin G. P.
- Preceded by: E. Dachjar Sudiawijaya
- Succeeded by: Soehoed Warnaen

Personal details
- Born: 14 September 1923 Ciamis, Dutch East Indies
- Died: 19 September 2008 (aged 85)

Military service
- Branch/service: Indonesian Army
- Rank: Colonel

Ahmad Nasuhi (14 September 1923 – 19 September 2008) was an Indonesian military officer who served as the Vice Governor of West Java between 1968 and 1973. He served in the Indonesian Army during the Indonesian National Revolution as a commander of a battalion within the Siliwangi Division, and was a noted anti-communist officer in the Indonesian military following Indonesian independence. He was imprisoned in the late Sukarno period due to his role in attacks on communist offices, before being freed during the Suharto period and becoming vice governor.

== Early life ==
Nasuhi was born in Ciamis on 14 September 1923. After graduating from the colonial elementary school (Hollandsch-Inlandsche School), his parents enrolled him at a number of Islamic boarding schools. By 1940, he was studying at a pesantren in Tasikmalaya. During the Japanese occupation of the Dutch East Indies, he enrolled at the Islamic Institute in Jakarta. During the occupation period, Nasuhi along with several other youths signed up for the Japanese-formed PETA militia, and while they were initially rejected, Mohammad Hatta convinced the Japanese military officers to accept them.

== Military career ==
Nasuhi joined the Indonesian Army following the start of the independence war, and by 1948 he was in command a battalion within the Siliwangi Division with the rank of major. During the Madiun Affair, the battalion fought militias aligned with the Indonesian Communist Party (PKI) in Surakarta and Wonogiri. After the rebellion, Nasuhi's battalion publicly executed PKI's military commander major general Djoko Sujono in Pacitan. In response to the Dutch military offensive in 1948, the division relocated, and Nasuhi's unit moved from the vicinity of Temanggung in Central Java to the Ci Tanduy valley in West Java, fighting both Dutch and Darul Islam forces in the process. The battalion's chief of staff was killed in action, and three of the four companies comprising the unit were disorganized during the retreat.

After the revolution, Nasuhi was promoted to lieutenant colonel and placed in command of a brigade within the West Java military province. His former battalion was consolidated and reformed into the modern 303rd Raider Infantry Battalion. Nasuhi had a reputation as an ardent anti-communist, and one account noted that he invited a fellow officer to launch a grenade attack at PKI offices. On 4 July 1957, a grenade was thrown at the PKI headquarters, and another grenade was thrown at the headquarters of the Central All-Indonesian Workers Organization (SOBSI) labor organization in late July. Throughout 1957, grenade attacks occurred throughout Jakarta, targeting prominent politicians and party/government offices, culminating in an attack on Sukarno at a school in Cikini on 30 November 1957 which killed ten people and injured many schoolchildren. Nasuhi was put on trial over his role in the PKI and SOBSI attacks and admitted to ordering a subordinate to launch the two attacks as a form of "psychological warfare against the central government"; however, he disavowed any connection to the Cikini attack. He was jailed after the Cikini incident.

== Government and private career ==
Nasuhi was released from prison after seven years, and became a member of the Provisional People's Consultative Assembly between 1966 and 1971, in addition to becoming the deputy minister of mining. He was appointed as Vice Governor of West Java under Mashudi on 25 November 1968 after months of deadlock in the provincial parliament. In 1970, Mashudi's term as governor ended and he was replaced with Solihin Gautama Purwanegara, formerly a company commander under Nasuhi's battalion during the revolution. During his tenure, he promoted land reform in the province, remarking that the policy was "not a communist theory, but a humanist theory". After his tenure expired in 1973, the position of vice governor would remain vacant until 1978 when Suhud Warnaen was appointed to fill the post.

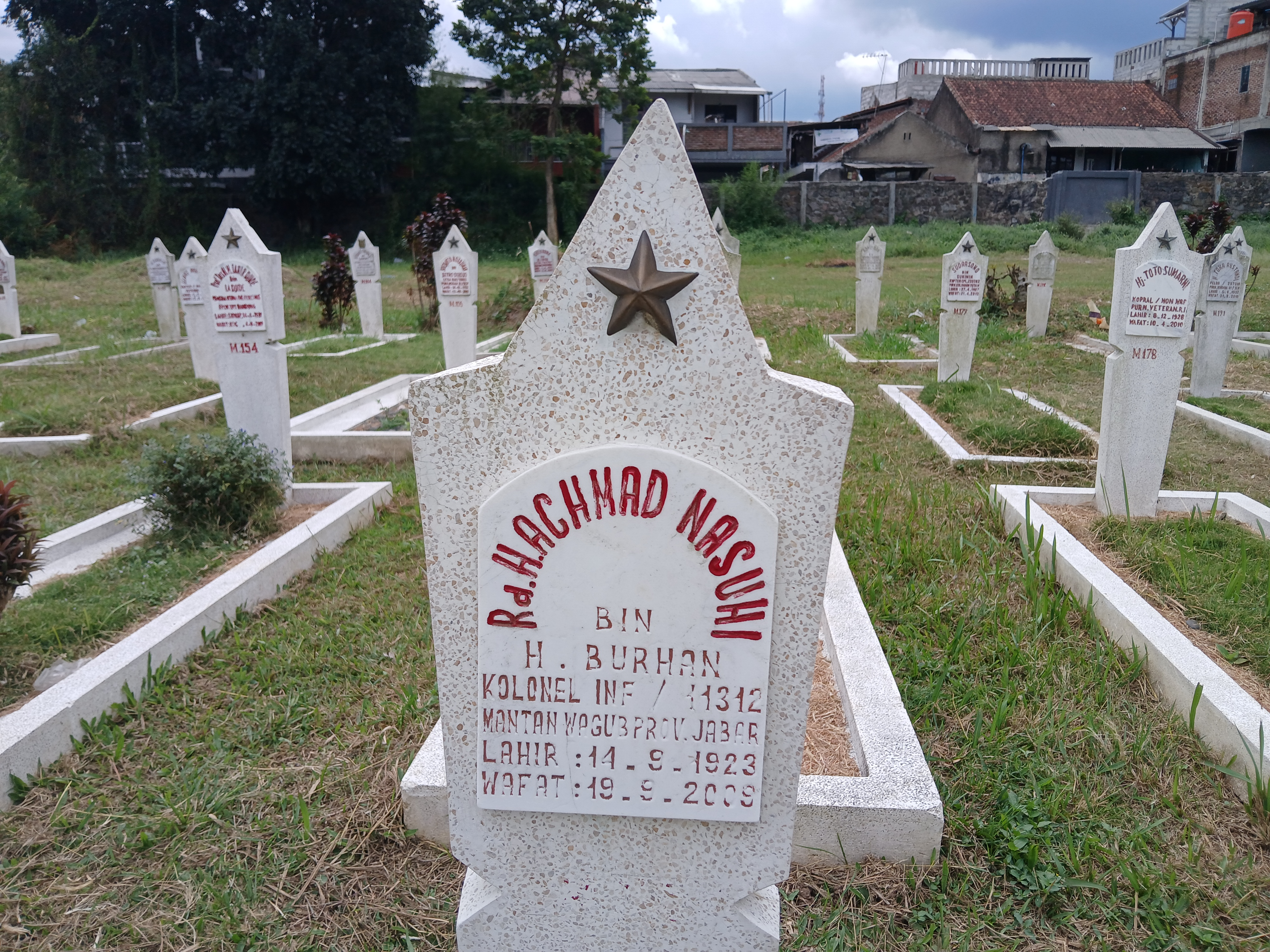
Ahmad Nasuhi's gravestone at the Cikutra Heroes' Cemetery.

After his term, he became commissioner at the state-owned agricultural company Pertani until 1981, and in 1997, he led an agrochemicals company. He died on 19 September 2008 and was buried at the Cikutra Heroes' Cemetery in Bandung, with a final rank of colonel in the army.
