= List of ambassadors of Indonesia to Saudi Arabia =

Ambassador of Indonesia to Saudi Arabia Accredited to OIC
- Duta Besar Indonesia untuk Arab Saudi سفير اندونيسيا في المملكة العربية السعودية
- Emblem of the Ministry of Foreign Affairs

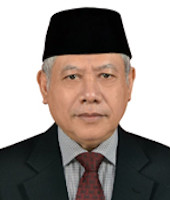
- Incumbent; Abdul Aziz Ahmad since 25 October 2021
- Ministry of Foreign Affairs; Embassy of Indonesia, Riyadh
- Style: His Excellency (formal)
- Seat: Riyadh, Saudi Arabia
- Appointer: President of Indonesia
- Inaugural holder: H. M. Rasyidi
- Formation: 1950
- Website: kemlu.go.id/riyadh

The following are the list of Indonesian diplomats that served as Ambassador of the Republic of Indonesia to the Kingdom of Saudi Arabia.

No.	Foto	Ambassador	Term start	Term end	Accredited to	Appointed by	Ref.
1		H. M. Rasyidi (Ambassador to Egypt)	1950	1951		Soekarno	
2		Sulaiman	1952	1954		Soekarno	
3		Kjahi Achmad Zabidi	1955	1959		Soekarno	
4		Muhammad Ilyas	1959	1965		Soekarno	
5		Aminuddin Azis	1967	1972			
6		Rus'an	1972	1976		Soeharto	
7		Djanamar Adjam	1976	1979		Soeharto	
8		Teuku Mohammad Hadi Thayeb	1979	1981		Soeharto	
9		Achmad Tirtosudiro	1982	1985		Soeharto	
10		Aang Kunaefi	1986	1989		Soeharto	
11		E. Soekasah Somawidjaja	1989	1992		Soeharto	
12		Ismail Suny	1993	1996		Soeharto	
13		Zarkowi Soejoeti	1997	1999		Soeharto	
14		Baharuddin Lopa	1999	2001		B.J. Habibie	
15		Muhammad Maftuh Basyuni	2001	12 December 2004		Megawati Soekarnoputri	
16		Salim Segaf Al-Jufri	2005	2009		Susilo Bambang Yudhoyono	
17		Gatot Abdullah Mansyur	20 January 2010	31 December 2013		Susilo Bambang Yudhoyono	
18		Abdurrahman Mohammad Fachir	14 February 2014 (Credential: 29 August 2014)	27 October 2014		Susilo Bambang Yudhoyono	
19		Agus Maftuh Abegebriel	13 January 2016; Credential: 22 June 2016 (Saudi Arabia); 6 April 2016 (OIC)	30 September 2021	OIC	Joko Widodo	
20		Abdul Aziz Ahmad	25 October 2021	Incumbent	OIC	Joko Widodo	

== See also ==
- List of Indonesian ambassadors
- List of diplomatic missions of Indonesia
- Embassy of Saudi Arabia, Jakarta
- Foreign relations of Saudi Arabia
- Indonesia–Saudi Arabia relations
