= M. Nausan =

Muhammad Nausan
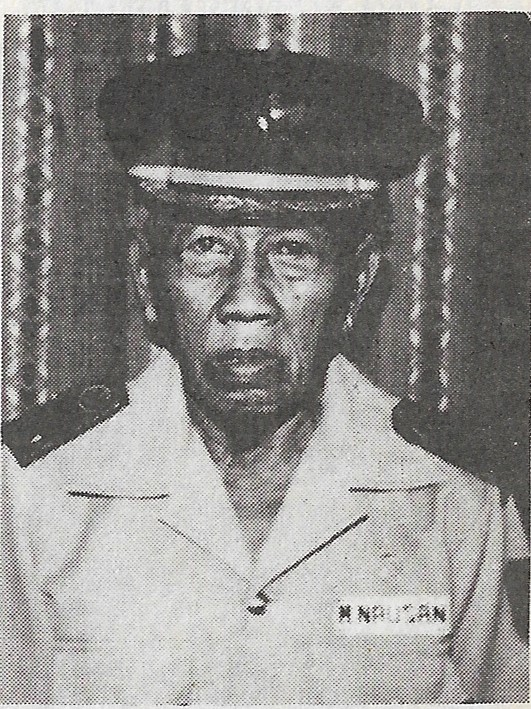

Chief of the Bekasi Second-Level Autonomous Region
- In office 27 January 1958 – 26 January 1960
- Governor: Ipik Gandamana
- Preceded by: Sampoerno Kolopaking (as Regent)
- Succeeded by: Maun (as Regent)

Personal details
- Born: April 10, 1911 Gabus Village, Bekasi, West Java
- Died: October 18, 1989 (aged 78) Bekasi, West Java

Muhammad Nausan bin Rindon (10 April 1911 – 18 October 1989) was the Chief of the Bekasi Second-Level Autonomous Region from 1958 until 1960.

== Early life ==
Nausan was born on 10 April 1911 in the Gabus village (now Srimukti village), a small village located in the northern part of Bekasi, West Java. He came from an affluent family, as his father, Rindon, owned hundreds of acres of lands from Bekasi to Cikampek as well as ricefields in multiple locations in West Java.

Nausan spent his childhood in Gabus. As a child, he studied pencak silat and attended the Dutch-established Hollandsch-Inlandsche School. Nausan was fluent in Dutch.

== Career ==
Nausan inherited his father's land and wealth. During the Indonesian National Revolution, Nausan supported Indonesian soldiers by providing financial aid and resources. He ensured the families of the fighters had enough to live on by sharing the harvest from his extensive lands and provided jobs for the soldiers after the revolution ended. Some of the soldiers were recruited to tend his lands and ricefields. Nausan was also respected by local warriors in Bekasi and recruited these warriors to guard his properties. Nausan, along with Noer Alie, Haji Jole, and Major Oking, were the key figures in driving away the Dutch forces from Bekasi.

On 27 January 1958, Nausan was appointed by the decree of the Minister of Home Affairs as the Chief of the Bekasi Second-Level Autonomous Region. Before his appointment, the post was double-hatted with the post of the Regent of Bekasi (the official title was Regent/Chief of the Second-Level Autonomous Region of Bekasi). Nausan served alongside two different regents: Sampoerno Kolopaking and Son Prawiraadiningrat. As the chief of Bekasi, Nausan was influential in opening the Kalimalang inspection road, which stretched from Tambun to Pangkalan Jati. Hundreds of Gabus Village residents terraformed the tree-covered marshland into an open field. Nausan was also known for his close relationship with the community and opened his house for discussions with the populace. He also oversaw the construction of roads in the Gabus Village and the Bekasi District Court.

== Personal life ==
Nausan died in Bekasi on 18 October 1989.
