= Himawan Sutanto =

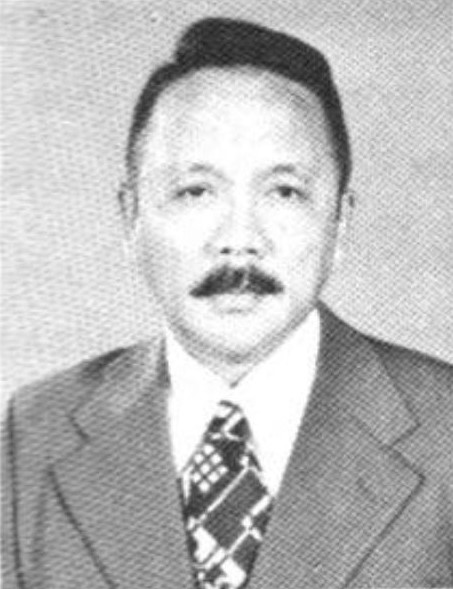

4th Chief Scout of the Pramuka Movement
- In office 5 November 1993 – 5 November 1998
- President: Suharto; Bacharuddin Jusuf Habibie
- Preceded by: Mashudi
- Succeeded by: Rivai Harahap

8th Commander of Kostrad
- In office 4 May 1974 – 4 January 1975
- Preceded by: Poniman
- Succeeded by: Leo Lopulisa

Personal details
- Born: Raden Himawan Soetanto; September 14, 1929 Gorang-Gareng, Nguntoronadi, Magetan, Dutch East Indies
- Died: October 20, 2010 (aged 81) Gatot Soebroto Army Hospital, Jakarta, Indonesia
- Spouse: Nonon Ratnapuri
- Relations: Major General Mohamad Mangoendiprodjo (father); Widaningsri (sister); Susilo Sudarman (brother in law)
- Children: 4
- Education: Indonesian Military Academy, Yogyakarta, 1948

Military service
- Allegiance: Indonesia
- Branch/service: Indonesian Army
- Years of service: 1948—1984
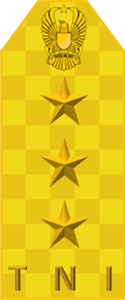
- Rank: Lieutenant General
- Unit: Infantry

Lieutenant General Raden Himawan Soetanto (14 September 1929 – 20 October 2010) was a high-ranking officer of the Indonesian Army and former Commander of the Indonesian Army Strategic Reserve Command.

== Early life ==
Himawan Sutanto was born in Gorang-Gareng, Magetan, East Java. The son of an Independence fighter, Major General Muhammad Mangundiprojo, leader of the TKR in East Java participating in the Battle of Surabaya, Head of the East Java Command of the PETA battalions, Chief of Staff of the Ministry of Defense and an Advisor to General Sudirman.

At the age of 16, he joined the Sawunggaling army to fight with his father at Palagan Surabaya, fighting against British troops on October 28, 1945, at Wonokromo, Surabaya. Himawan later became a cadet of the Military Academy in Yogyakarta and joined the Siliwangi Division during the long march back to West Java.

== Military career ==
Hinawan Susanto was an Operations Officer in the 6th Infantry Regiment/Sriwijaya, Cadet Company Commander of the Military Academy, ALO/Air Liaison Officer (Operation August 17), 1948. Lieutenant Himawan was a student of Batch I of the Military Academy at Yogyakarta, and briefly attended the Infantry Officer Advanced Course at Fort Benning, USA. As a Cadet he was sent to assignments against Dutch forces at Subang, North Bandung. In September 1948, Hinawan entered the Siliwangi Division, where he participated in defeating the Communist rebellion at Madiun, alongside a Student Army Company. On December 19, 1948, Hinawan graduated from the Military Academy Yogyakarta with the rank of Second Lieutenant, he was supposed to serve in an artillery battalion in Kediri, East Java, but this did not occur because the city of Yogyakarta had been occupied by Dutch forces, marking the start of the second phase of the War for Independence. He instead went to West Java and found another military unit to join.

In 1949, he took part in the Siliwangi long march from Yogyakarta to West Java, fighting against Dutch forces and the Darul Islam rebellion.

After the end of the War of Indonesian Independence, he once again fought against Darul Islam. From 1955 to 1957, Hinawan and his father both served in the same place, when he became an Operations Officer of the 6th Infantry Regiment/Sriwijaya based in Lampung and his father served as the Resident of Lampung.

From 1960 to 1961, Susanto served as a Staff Officer of the Second Garuda Contingent, United Nations Operations Battalion Headquarters (1961-1964) in Leopoldiville, Congo. In 1963, he served in the Middle East as Commander of the Southern Brigade, United Nations Emergency Forces.

During the Permesta rebellion, rebel troops under the command of Lt. Col. Andi Selle at Pinrang attempted to assassinate Infantry Colonel M. Yusuf, Regional Military Commander of Kodam XIV/Hasanuddin, on April 10, 1964. Major Himawan Soetanto took the initiative to lead Battalion 330/Kujang-1, with only 20% of its strength, managing to recapture Polewali, the center of dissident forces and successfully killing Lt. Col. Andi Selle. Sutanto also participated in destroying one of the main forces of Darul Islam, led by Abdul Kahar Muzakkar in South Sulawesi. For his bravery, the Commander of the Indonesian Armed Forces (PANGAD), Lt. Gen. Ahmad Yani gave him the Nararya Service Star and a special promotion to Battalion Commander of Battalion 330/Kujang I Siliwangi. He was later recalled to Kodam VI/Siliwangi, in West Java, becoming Chief of Staff of Infantry Brigade 15/Tirtayasa (now Brigif 15/Kujang II Kodam III/Siliwangi).

== Personal life ==
Himawan was married to Nonon Ratnapuri in Tasikmalaya, who he had known while serving in East Priangan. The wedding reception took place in Lampung. They had four children, Purwanto Indrawan, Dwi Prihanti Indriani, Tri Susanti Indrayani and Cahyono Indrakusuma

Himawan Soetanto died at the Gatot Soebroto Army Hospital, Jakarta. On Wednesday, October 20, 2010, at 09.51 WIB. He was buried at Cikutra Heroes Cemetery, Bandung.
