= Hadji Djole =

Indonesian politician (1905–1969)

- Born: Sa'adah bin Haji Eman c. 1905; Bekasi, Dutch East Indies
- Died: 25 December 1969 (aged 64); Bekasi, Indonesia
- Father: Haji Eman
- Military career
- Allegiance: Indonesia
- Service years: 1945 - ?
- Conflicts: Indonesian National Revolution: Kali Bekasi incident

Hadji Djole, also written as Haji Jole, Haji Djole, H. Jole, or H. Djole; (1905 – 25 December 1969), was a strongman and an Indonesian independence fighter from Bekasi.

== Biography ==
Djole was born Sa'adah bin Haji Eman in Sepatan, Bekasi in 1905. He came from a wealthy and respected family. His father's name was Haji Eman. During his childhood, he was often called Djole.

=== Indonesian National Revolution ===
During the Indonesian National Revolution, Djole fought against Dutch, British, and Japanese forces. He commanded around 50 troops and was reportedly an assistant to Pak Matjan. Djole was also said to have close ties with Haji Darip and was part of Darip's group. He held power around the police station and had influence in the areas of Pekayon, Teluk Pucung, and Karang Congkok.

He was involved in the Kali Bekasi incident, where 87 Japanese soldiers were massacred and the killing of 22 British soldiers, whose bodies were later buried near the river not far from the police station. He continued to resist the Dutch even when TKR/TNI troops had to retreat from the Jakarta area. In 1946, his group was reportedly involved in acts of robbery and the abduction of women. Additionally, his group was also reported to have sent death threats to village chiefs.

In May 1949, Djole operated along the eastern banks of the Bekasi River after brokering an agreement with one of the Siliwangi commanders to prevent conflict. He chose this area because the Dutch rarely conducted patrols there. That same year, there were rumors that he planned to seize Batavia through the armed group Bamboe Roentjing. To carry out the mission, he assigned his subordinates to disguise themselves as papaya sellers and deliver documents hidden inside the fruit to anti-Dutch groups.

Djole's actions led the Dutch to label him as a terrorist and a robber. The Dutch deployed the special HAMOT forces to track him down. However, the Dutch were unable to capture him until 1949. There were rumors that Djole possessed supernatural abilities, allowing him to appear in two places at the same time and change his appearance.

=== Post-transfer of sovereignty era ===
After the Dutch transferred sovereignty to the Indonesian government in 1949, Djole decided to leave military service. In 1954, he joined the IPKI and became the party's board member of the Bekasi branch. During the 1955 election, Djole was involved in IPKI's campaign efforts in rural Bekasi.

Djole died in Bekasi on 25 December 1969 and was buried in a cemetery that is now located in the middle of the Kemang Pratama residential complex. The Veterans' Legion of Indonesia placed the red and white flag on his grave to prove he was a freedom fighter.

== Awards ==
A street in Mustikajaya is named after Djole. His contributions to the national revolution were featured in the film Singa Karawang-Bekasi (2003).
