= Maun (regent) =

Indonesian soldier and politician

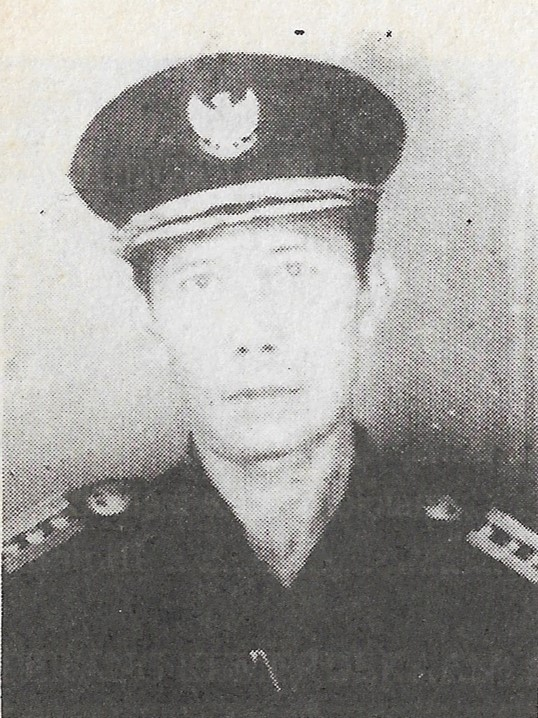

Regent of Bekasi
- In office 1960–1967
- Preceded by: Son Prawiraadiningrat (acting regent); M. Nausan (chief)
- Succeeded by: Sukat Subandi

Personal details
- Born: April 5, 1913
- Died: April 29, 1969 (aged 56)

Military service
- Allegiance: Indonesia
- Branch/service: Indonesian Army
- Rank: Captain

Maun, also known as Ismaun (5 January 1913 – 29 April 1969), was an Indonesian military officer who served as the Regent of Bekasi from 1960 until 1967.

== Life and career ==
Born on 5 January 1913, Maun served in the Indonesian Army and reached the rank of captain before being appointed as the Regent of Bekasi on 29 January 1960. During his tenure, Maun oversaw the development of the agriculture in Bekasi, and moved his office from the Jatinegara Street to the Juanda Street on 2 April 1960. He was assisted by a six-member daily governing body, which was chaired by himself and consisted of representative of political parties and organizations in Jakarta. Maun died on 29 April 1969 and was buried at the Cikutra Cemetery.
