= Suko Martono =

Indonesian politician and army officer

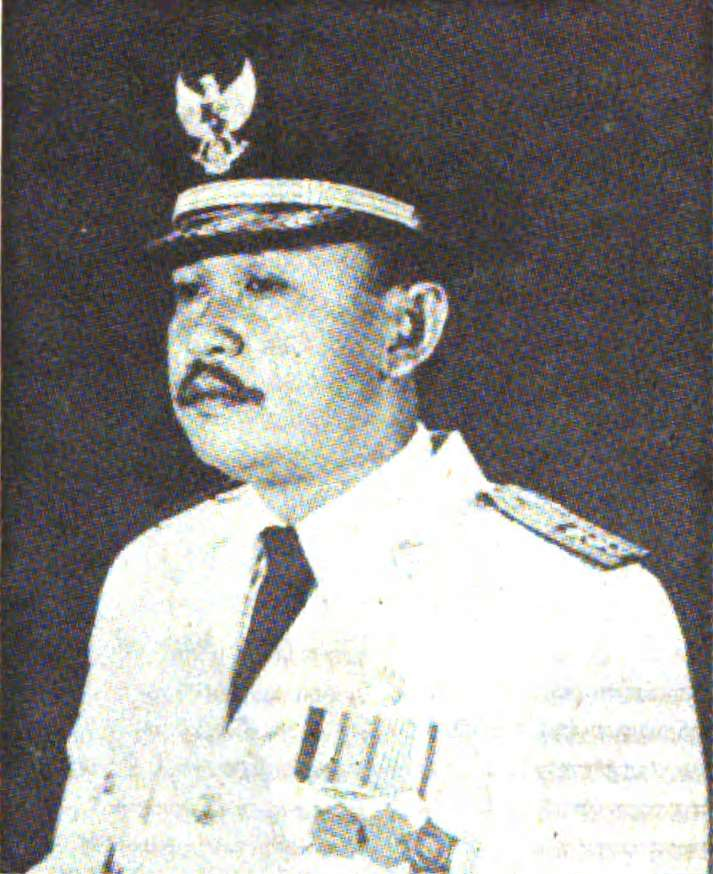

Member of the People's Representative Council
- In office 1 October 1997 – 1 October 1999
- Parliamentary group: Golkar
- Constituency: West Java

Regent of Bekasi
- In office 9 November 1983 – 9 November 1993
- Governor: Aang Kunaefi; Yogie Suardi Memet
- Preceded by: Abdul Fatah
- Succeeded by: Mochammad Djamhari

Personal details
- Born: July 24, 1941 Madiun, Dutch East Indies
- Died: December 26, 2014 (aged 73) Gatot Soebroto Army Hospital, Jakarta
- Party: Golkar
- Spouse: Budhi Hariarti (m. 1966)
- Children: Andyawan Martono Putra; Heri Budisusetyo; Aji Sandi Nugroho Kusumaningtyas
- Parents: RNG Prawiro Atmodjo (father); RNGT Semoro Wati (mother)

Military service
- Allegiance: Indonesia
- Branch/service: Indonesian Army
- Years of service: 1965 – 1996
- Rank: Brigadier general
- Unit: Artillery
- Commands: Bekasi Military District; 10th Air Defense Artillery Battalion; 3rd Air Defense Artillery Battalion
- Battles/wars: Vietnam War

Suko Martono (24 July 1941 – 26 December 2014) was an Indonesian politician and army officer. He was Bekasi's regent from 1983 until 1993 and a member of the People's Representative Council from 1997 until 1999.

== Early life and military career ==
Suko Martono was born on 24 July 1941 in Madiun as the son of aristocrats RNG Prawiro Atmodjo and RNGT Semoro Wati. He began his education at the Madiun State Elementary School in 1953. He then continued to the Madiun state junior high school and high school in 1956 and 1960.

Suko Martono joined the Indonesian Military Academy shortly after finishing high school. He graduated in 1965 and was commissioned as a second lieutenant from the artillery corps. He began his career in 1967 as a training officer at the air defence artillery training center in Malang. His career gradually rose in the training center, receiving promotion to first lieutenant in 1969 and captain in 1971. He was appointed as the chief of general affairs in the training center.

In 1973, the commander of the army air defence artillery corps Brigadier General Harsoyo was sent to Vietnam as the commander of the Garuda Contingent in the International Commission of Control and Supervision. Suko joined him as his aide-de-camp. After the contingent finished its duty in 1974, Suko attended an advanced training course for air artillery officers. He was promoted to captain the next year and became deputy commander of the 14th Air Defence Artillery Battalion in Cirebon.

After two years as deputy commander, Suko was sent to Bandung as the commander of the 3rd Air Defence Artillery Battalion on 18 November 1977. He left the post on 26 May 1979 after being selected to study at the Indonesian Army Command and General Staff College for six months. After completing his studies in 1980, Suko was promoted to the rank of lieutenant colonel and became the commander of the 10th Air Defence Artillery Battalion in Jakarta.

Suko returned to West Java upon his appointment as the commander of the Bekasi Military District in 1982. He held the position for eight months before being elected as the regent of Bekasi. Suko received a promotion to the rank of colonel in 1986, three years into his term as regent. Shortly prior to his retirement in 1996, Suko was promoted to brigadier general.

== Political career ==
Suko was elected as Bekasi's regent by the Bekasi council several months after becoming district commander. He was installed on 9 November 1983 and again on 10 November 1988. At the start of his tenure, Suko did not make any major breakthrough and followed his predecessor's masterplan for Bekasi, which was projected to last until 2005. Suko also refused to do any major personnel reshuffles in the local government. He oversaw the construction of Bekasi's Islamic Centre and encouraged locals to cultivate soybean and maize. Under his rule, industries flourished in Bekasi, resulting in a significant increase of regional income.

After ending his tenure as regent on 9 November 1993, Suko was appointed as the director for political development in the Department of Home Affairs. In his capacity, Suko backed the chief of Surabaya civil registration office, who refused to register the marriage of a Confucian couple. Suko lauded the chief for "taking a bold action".

At the end of his tenure, Suko was appointed as the member of the 1997 Indonesian legislative election supervisory committee. Suko was also nominated by Golkar as a member of the People's Representative Council from West Java electoral district. He was elected and served for two years until 1999. Upon retirement, Suko became the chairman of the Nurul Islam foundation, a foundation that manages the Islamic Center he had established.

== Personal life ==
Suko married Budhi Hariarti, a painter, on 9 December 1966. The couple has three sons. His oldest child, Andyawan Martono Putra, currently served in the air force as the deputy chief of staff, while his middle child, Heri Budisusetyo, was the secretary of Golkar's branch in Bekasi.

Suko died on 26 December 2014 at the Gatot Soebroto Army Hospital. A month prior to his death, Suko had been treated intensively for heart cancer. His body was interred at the Al Azhar Memorial Garden in Karawang. In 2023, the Bekasi government named a building in its office and a road in Bekasi after him.
