= Herry Koesaeri =

Indonesian bureaucrat and lecturer

Regent of Bekasi (temporary officeholder)
- In office 19 April 2007 – 14 May 2007
- Governor: Danny Setiawan
- Preceded by: Tenny Wishramwan
- Succeeded by: Sa'duddin
- In office 16 February 2006 – 27 April 2006
- Governor: Danny Setiawan
- Preceded by: Saleh Manaf
- Succeeded by: Tenny Wishramwan

Personal details
- Born: September 17, 1952 Sumedang, West Java, Indonesia
- Died: February 1, 2022 (aged 69) Bekasi, West Java, Indonesia

Herry Koesaeri (17 September 1952 – 1 February 2022) was an Indonesian bureaucrat and lecturer. He was Bekasi's temporary regent from February to April 2006 and from April to May 2007.

== Education and career ==
Herry was born on 17 September 1952 in Sumedang as the son of Soelaeman. He studied public administration at the General Soedirman University and graduated in 1985. He was appointed as the regional secretary of Bekasi in 2003, replacing Memet Rochamat. After regent Saleh Manaf was discharged by the minister of home affairs on 16 January 2006, Herry was appointed as the temporary officeholder until 27 April 2006.

Herry was nominated as the acting regent of Bekasi by the local council. He was nominated alongside Tenny Wishramwan (chief of the Purwakarta Regional Coordinating Board) and Memet Rochamat (Herry's predecessor). Tenny was approved by the governor, and he became Bekasi's acting regent from 27 April 2006 until 19 April 2007. Herry then resumed his position as temporary officeholder until Sa'duddin became the definitive officeholder on 14 May 2007.

Upon retiring from civil service, Herry became a lecturer at the Bekasi Islam 45 University and the Abdi Negara School of Governance Sciences. He also became the treasurer of the Bekasi Islamic Center.

== Personal life ==
Herry was married to Diah Subekti.

Herry died on 1 February 2022 at the Bekasi Regional Hospital.
