= Abdul Aziz Ahmad =

Indonesian diplomat (born 1954)

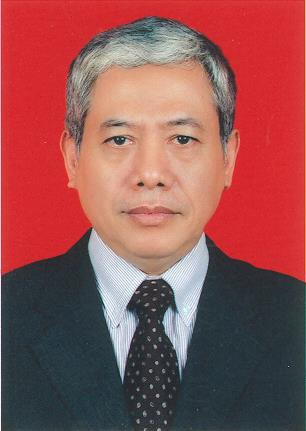

Ambassador of Indonesia to Saudi Arabia
- Incumbent
- Assumed office 25 October 2021
- Preceded by: Agus Maftuh Abegebriel

Commissioner of the General Elections Commission
- In office 23 October 2007 – 12 April 2012

Personal details
- Born: 24 September 1954 (age 71) Cianjur, West Java, Indonesia
- Education: Syarif Hidayatullah State Islamic Institute; Monash University; Sunan Kalijaga State Islamic University

Abdul Aziz Ahmad (born 24 September 1954) is an Indonesian academician, bureaucrat, and diplomat serving as ambassador to Saudi Arabia since 2021. He previously served as commissioner of the General Elections Commission from 2007 to 2012 and held several key positions within the Department of Religious Affairs.

== Early life and education ==
Abdul was born in Cianjur on 24 September 1954 as the son of Ahmad Junaedi. He studied Arabic language and culture at the Syarif Hidayatullah State Islamic Institute in Jakarta, where he graduated from in 1981. During his university years, he was a member of the Indonesian Muslim Students Movement as the chairman of the organization's branch in 1975 and the secretary of cadre development in the central board from 1975 to 1977. In the university, he was the deputy chairman of his faculty's student senate in 1974. After completing his bachelor's education, Azis pursued his master's studies in anthropology and sociology at the Monash University and graduated in 1992. He received his doctorate in Islamic thought from the Sunan Kalijaga State Islamic University in 2010.

== Career ==
Abdul career began as a part-time lecturer of Arabic languages at his almamater from 1975 to 1981. He also worked as a cabin crew member for Garuda and Merpati airlines during the Hajj seasons of 1974, 1975, and 1979. Subsequently, he transitioned to journalism, working as a reporter for Risalah Islamiyah magazine from 1979 to 1981, and editor for Bina Desa bulletin, a bulletin of the Indonesian Secretariat for the Development of Human Resources in Rural Areas, from 1981 to 1983.

=== Department of Religious Affairs ===
In 1986, Abdul began working as a researcher in the Department of Religious Affairs, focusing on social affairs. A few years after receiving his master's degree, in 1996 Azis was appointed as the acting chief for legislations in the department's research agency. He became the chief of planning in the department's research agency for interreligious life the next year, before being promoted as the agency's chief of facilities in 1998 and chief of program and planning in 1999.

Abdul was transferred to the Directorate General for Islamic Institutions in 2000 to serve as the directorate general's secretary for a few months. Afterwards, he was assigned to several middle-ranking positions in the directorate general, including as the director for Islamic education in public schools from 2000 to 2001. He was then transferred to director for religious education and pesantren from 2001 to 2002, during which he launched a compulsory education program for salafi pesantrens.

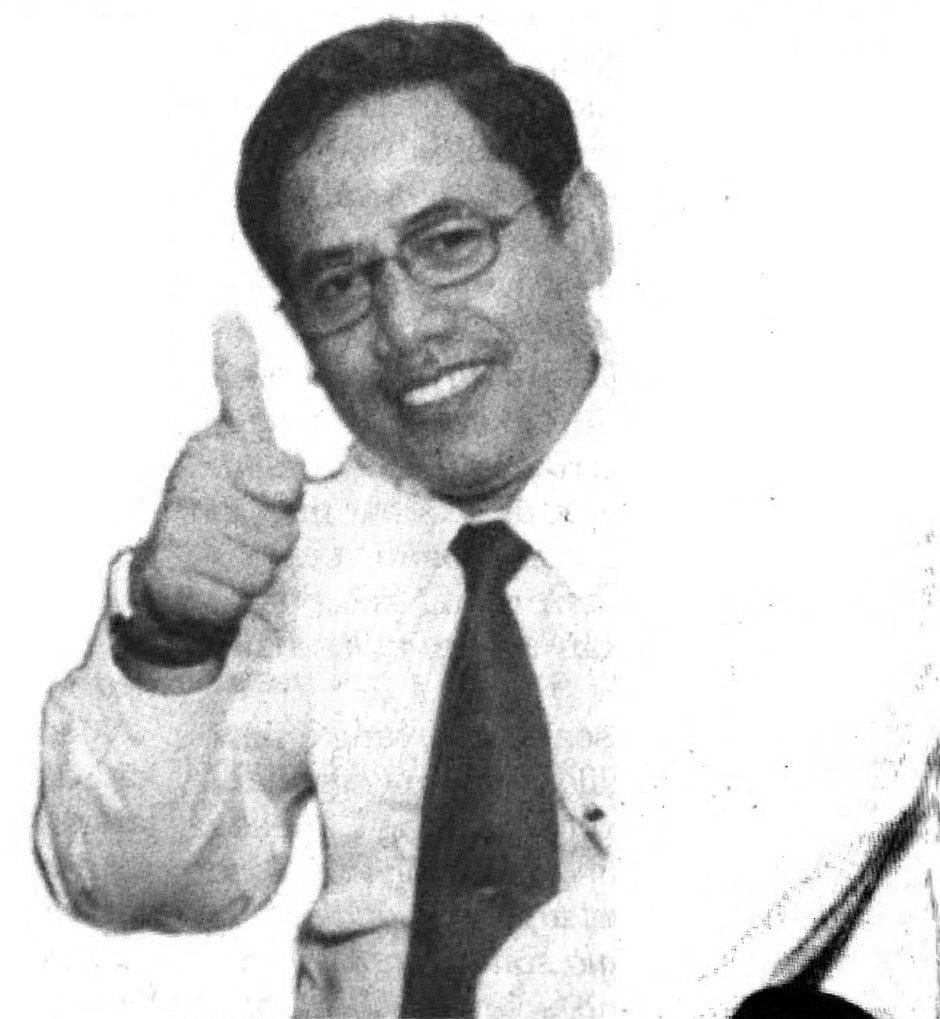
Abdul as director for madrasa and Islamic education, 2002.

Abdul was appointed as the director for madrasa and Islamic education in 2002. Abdul frequently voiced his concerns on madrasa's perception and education quality, which, according to him, was caused by a lack of funding, shortage of qualified and permanent teachers, as well as the lack of autonomy by its headmasters. To improve its image and increase competitiveness, Azis initiated national Olympiad for madrasa students and held nationwide competitions for students, teachers, and madrasa institutions. Under his supervision, he decentralized the management of madrasas to regional government. In light of the new education law enacted in 2003, Abdul also introduced standardization program on madrasa to meet national education standards and stated that madrasas that were unwilling or unable to comply "should just dissolve itself". He welcomed efforts on multi-departmental collaboration between his agency and the Directorate General of Basic Education to improve school-based management in madrasas. He was removed from his post on 2 February 2005 in a sweeping personnel change conducted by religious affairs minister Maftuh Basyuni, and was replaced by Firdaus, who had previously served as the deputy rector of the Palembang State Islamic Institute. He then returned to the department's research agency.

=== Commissioner and advisor ===
On 4 October 2007, the House of Representative's second commission elected Abdul along with six other commissioners for the General Elections Commission with 27 votes. He was confirmed five days later and was installed on 23 October. He was assigned the responsibility of managing logistics in the commission, in which he stated that the commission was struggling due to a lack of operational vehicles, as most of its operational vehicles are in the hands of prior officials. The commission then announced its purchase of operational cars and motorcycles for its central and regional offices across Indonesia, including its commissioners, which was protested by NGOs due to the commission's poor performance and lack of accountability.

During the 2009 Indonesian general election, Abdul was entrusted with handling voter data validation and managing electoral district. Abdul, along with other electoral commissioners, conducted visits abroad to supervise foreign election committees and evaluate the election process, which was criticized as unnecessary, wasteful, and lacking in transparency.

Shortly before the election, the election supervisory board ordered the commission to investigate Abdul along with several other commissioners and secretary general regarding the legitimization of misplaced ballots and the poor handling and distribution of election logistics, which led to unsynchronized voting. Additionally, Abdul was investigated regarding the suspected corruption related to IT procurement in the commission.

Abdul's term as commissioner ended on 12 April 2012, and he returned to the Department of Religious Affairs research agency. On 6 September 2013, Abdul was appointed as advisor for economic and human resources to minister of manpower and transmigration Muhaimin Iskandar. He resigned from his position and retired from the civil service in September 2014. He unsuccessfully ran for a 2017–2022 membership in the election supervisory board.

=== Ambassador ===
In February 2021, Abdul was nominated by President Joko Widodo as ambassador to Tunisia. However, in a revised nomination in June that year, Abdul exchanged post with Muslim academician Zuhairi Misrawi, who had previously been nominated for ambassador to Saudi Arabia but received widespread rejection from Islamic groups in Indonesia. He faced an assessment by the House of Representative's first commission in July 2021. He was officially installed as ambassador to Saudi Arabia and the Organisation of Islamic Cooperation on 25 October 2021 and presented his credentials to Salman of Saudi Arabia on 20 September 2022.

Abdul is not a member of any party.

== Organization ==
Abdul was active in the Nahdlatul Ulama, becoming the population and family planning program manager at Nahdlatul Ulama's community service 1983 to 1986, and secretary general of Ansor Youth Movement, the organization's youth wing, from 1985 to 1990. During his tenure as general secretary, he was the head of the Indonesian delegation to a youth conference held in Cairo in 1988. He rose to become the chairman of Ansor from 1990 to 1995 and member of its supervisory board from 1995 to 2000. In the Nahdlatul Ulama, he became the deputy secretary general from 2000 to 2005 and chairman from 2005 to 2010. Around this time, from 2007 to 2010 he also served as the chairman of Nahdlatul Ulama's higher education commission.
