= Kali Bekasi incident =

1945 international incident between Japan and Indonesia

- Part of Indonesian National Revolution
Date	19 October 1945
Location	Bekasi River, West Java, Java, Indonesia
Result	Indonesian victory

Belligerents
Indonesia	Japan

Commanders and leaders
(Indonesia) Atmadinata (Indonesia) 2nd Lt. Zakaria (Indonesia) Maj. Sambas	Unknown

Units involved
People's Security Army	Imperial Japanese Navy

Strength
Hundreds	90

Casualties and losses
Unknown/none	90 captured later executed

On 19 October 1945, in the aftermath of Indonesia's declaration of independence, a clash broke out near the Bekasi River in West Java between Indonesian fighters and Japanese troops who were returning to mainland Japan following Japan's surrender at the end of World War II. Over 90 Japanese soldiers were captured and later executed.

== Background ==
After the atomic bombings of Hiroshima and Nagasaki, Japan decided to surrender unconditionally to the Allies, on 15 August and formally signed on 2 September 1945. The remaining Japanese forces in Indonesia, were gradually repatriated to mainland Japan via air routes. One of the repatriation processes of Japanese soldiers took place on October 19, 1945. At that time, 90 Japanese soldiers from the Imperial Japanese Navy (Kaigun) were transported by train to be taken to Kalijati Airport in Subang, West Java. During their journey by train, they passed several stations, including the Bekasi Station.

== Incident ==
The commander of the People's Security Army (TKR) in Sambas, Atmadinata, issued an order to the Deputy Commander of TKR Bekasi, Second Lieutenant Zakaria Burhanuddin, to allow the train carrying the Japanese soldiers to pass. However, Zakaria defied this order. He instructed the Bekasi Station staff to redirect the train from track two to track one. Track one, however, was a dead-end track that led to the vicinity of the Bekasi River. As a result, the locomotive, which was pulling nine carriages including three carriages carrying 90 soldiers of the Kaigun, was forced to stop right at the mouth of the Bekasi River. Once the train came to a halt, a crowd of local civilians and fighters from Bekasi immediately surrounded it.

Zakaria and several of his escorts then boarded the train and demanded to see the permission letter from the Government of the Republic of Indonesia (RI). The atmosphere inside the train carriage grew increasingly tense. Amid the inspection, a Kaigun soldier suddenly fired a pistol shot from one of the carriages. This shot served as a signal for the crowd of civilians and fighters to charge. Then, hundreds of people surged into the train, armed with various weapons. After a brief skirmish, the crowd succeeded in taking control of the train. They managed to overpower the train and seized the items inside, including hundreds of firearms. They then confined the 90 Japanese prisoners of war in a cell located behind the Bekasi Station building.

After being held for four hours, the prisoners of war were escorted by the Commander of the 5th TKR Regiment, Major Sambas, along with the crowd of civilians and fighters, to the banks of the Bekasi River. One by one, the soldiers were slaughtered, and their bodies were cast into the river. "The Bekasi River turned red from the blood that flowed from the bodies of the Japanese soldiers," described Dullah, a local resident of Bekasi who witnessed the event.

== Aftermath ==
Admiral Tadashi Maeda, upon learning of the incident, became enraged. In a tone of deep anger, the Japanese Imperial Navy and Army Liaison Officer vehemently protested to the Indonesian government. In response to this strong protest, the Chief of the Indonesian National Police, Police Commissioner General Raden Said Soekanto Tjokrodiatmodjo, along with a staff member from the Indonesian Ministry of Foreign Affairs named Boediarto, met with Maeda. During this meeting, as recorded by Hendi, both officials had to patiently endure the Admiral's fury. According to Maeda, the massacre at the Bekasi River could be used as evidence to the world that the Indonesian nation lacked firm resolve.

On October 25, 1945, Sukarno visited Bekasi to deliver a message of peace to the local community. He urged that such incidents should not be repeated and that the people of Bekasi should refrain from engaging in acts of violence that could bring harm. The people of Bekasi agreed to follow President Sukarno's order not to obstruct the repatriation of Japanese soldiers from Indonesia back to their homeland. Eventually, the Bekasi River Monument was established as a symbol of peace between Japan and Bekasi.

== See also ==
- Battle of Kotabaru
- Battle of Maguwo
- Battle of Semarang
