= Zuhairi Misrawi =

Indonesian writer

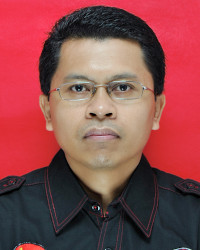
Zuhairi Misrawi, as candidate for a seat in the People's Representative Council of the Republic of Indonesia.

Zuhairi Misrawi (born in Sumenep, Madura, East Java, Indonesia, February 5, 1977) is an Indonesian writer. Misrawi first gained public notice as a young intellectual at Nahdlatul Ulama (NU), and a traditionalist member of the Sunni Islam group in Indonesia. Misrawi completed his undergraduate education with the Creed-Philosophy Department, Faculty of Usul al-Din, Al-Azhar University, Cairo, Egypt (1995–2000). Returning from Cairo, Misrawi was an active participant in the Institute for Study and Human Resource of Nahdlatul Ulama (Lakpesdam NU) and was the Coordinator of Study and Research in 2000–2002. Misrawi is close to the world of contemporary Islamic thought and has served as director of the "Moderate Muslim Society".

== Career ==
Since childhood, Misrawi made himself very familiar with the Islamic world, especially pesantren (Islamic boarding schools). He was a student of the Al-Quran Memorization Association (Jam'iyyah Tahfidz al-Quran) in 1989–1990. Misrawi continued his studies at the pesantren TMI al-Amien, Prenduan, Sumenep, Madura, for five years (1990–1995). From this pesantren world, Misrawi learned many of the basics of the Islamic sciences such as the Quran, Tafsir (interpretation science), Fiqh, literature, and philosophy.

While at the seminary, Misrawi became active in the world of journalism and writing. In pesantren, he also consecutively became the champion of the Scientific Writing Competition, that was carried out by the Islamic Library, from 1993 to 1995.

During Misrawi's six-year period of study at the seminary, he was not satisfied with staying in the search for knowledge, especially in the field of religion. Misrawi continued his graduate education in the Creed-Philosophy Department, Faculty of Usul al-Din, Al-Azhar University, Cairo, Egypt (1995–2000). Ever since Misrawi's time as a student, the ability of his analysis of the Islamic world continues to grow. He has been active in the world of writing and has been the editor (editor) on the bulletin Terobosan and also chief editor of university journal titled "Oase".

In the world of activism, Misrawi was active in the Institute of Philosophy in Egypt. Misrawi was also active in the Muslim Youth Forum A World in Alexandria. When Misrawi was in Egypt, thanks to his work in the world of activism and journalism, he had the opportunity to interview some of the major figures in the Islamic world, such as Yusuf al-Qaradhawi, Sayyed Yasin, Halah Mustafa, Youhanna Qaltah, 'Username' Iraqi, Muhammad 'Abd al-Bayoumi Mu'thi, Adonis and Nawal Saadawi.

After Misrawi finished his studies at Egypt in 2000 he returned to Indonesia and became directly active in the institutions of Study and Human Resource Nahdlatul Ulama (Lakpesdam NU) as the Coordinator for Study and Research from 2000 to 2002. Together with some the young leaders of other NU, Misrawi published a thought journal in Lakpesdam titled "Tashwirul Afkar" and made himself the editor of this journal from 2000 to 2005.

In 2006, Misrawi continued graduate studies (post-graduate) at the School of Philosophy in Driyarkara Jakarta. Although active as a political and Islamic activist, Misrawi continued to write. In general, Misrawi's writings are themed thoughts of contemporary Islam, politics, religious tolerance and interfaith dialogue. In 2008, Misrawi became the director of the Moderate Modern Society, in Jakarta. The Moderate Modern Society is a research institute that aims to convey the moderation in Indonesia's development approach, especially in terms of religious tolerance and social justice in a plural society (various) with democratic ideas.
