= Wikanda Darmawijaya =

Indonesian politician and army officer

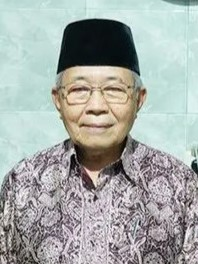

Regent of Bekasi
- In office 9 November 1998 – 21 January 2004
- Governor: Nana Nuriana
- Preceded by: Mochammad Djamhari
- Succeeded by: Saleh Manaf

Personal details
- Born: August 6, 1941 (age 84) Ciamis, Dutch East Indies
- Party: Golkar
- Spouse: Ratnaningsih

Military service
- Allegiance: Indonesia
- Branch/service: Indonesian Army
- Years of service: 1965 – 1996
- Rank: Colonel
- Unit: Infantry

Wikanda Darmawijaya (born 6 August 1941) is a former Indonesian politician and army officer who was Bekasi's regent from 1998 until 2003.

== Career ==
Wikanda is born on 6 August 1941. He attended the Indonesian Military Academy and was commissioned as an infantry second lieutenant in 1965. He began his career a year later as a platoon commander in the 509th Infantry Battalion in Jember. He was assigned various position in the battalion until 1971, including as deputy commander of the A-company (1969), deputy commander of the support company (1970), and chief of the 2nd section (1971). He was transferred to the 514th infantry battalion in Bondowoso, where he became commander of support company.

In 1972, Wikanda was assigned to the 515th infantry battalion in Banyuwangi as a company commander. The battalion was sent as a task force for military operations in Irian Jaya and Wikanda took part in the operation. Upon his return, in 1974 he became the deputy commander of the 516th infantry battalion in Gresik. He moved to Jakarta in 1975, where he became the chief of research at the training regiment of Jakarta's regional military command. On the same year, he was transferred to the 1st infantry brigade as a section chief.

In 1978, Wikanda was sent to the Jakarta military education and training command as a military lecturer. For the next eight years, he handled student regiment. He headed the national student regiment leadership course in 1978 and led the student regiment's task force to East Timor in 1979. He was the chief of program control at the Jakarta's regional military command from 1980 until 1982 before becoming the commander of Jakarta's student regiment from 1982 until 1986. Wikanda's last military office was as the director for general affairs in the training regiment.

== Political career in Bekasi ==
Wikanda began his bureaucratic career in 1986 while he was still in uniform. He was appointed as the chief regional inspector of the Bekasi Regency. As inspector, Wikanda ordered the closing of four illegal digging sites in Bekasi.

He was later appointed as the chairman of Golkar in Bekasi, for which he received an honorary promotion to the rank of colonel on 19 July 1995. Wikanda then became the speaker of Bekasi's Regional People's Representative Council, replacing Abdul Manan. Shortly after becoming speaker, Wikanda was nominated as a possible candidate for the mayor of the newly established city of Bekasi. However, he later withdrew his candidacy.

Wikanda was then nominated as Bekasi's regent. He was installed for the position on 9 November 1998 after being elected by Bekasi's regional council. Wikanda's early years as regent were marred with political unrest, which forced the government to accommodate the demands of the people. On 28 December 1998, Wikanda issued a directive to move the center of government to Cikarang, in order to develop the eastern territory of Bekasi. The turn of the second millennium saw a significant increase in investment and migrants to Bekasi.

== Personal life ==
Wikanda is married to Ratnaningsih.
