= Sa'duddin =

Indonesian politician (1961–2021)

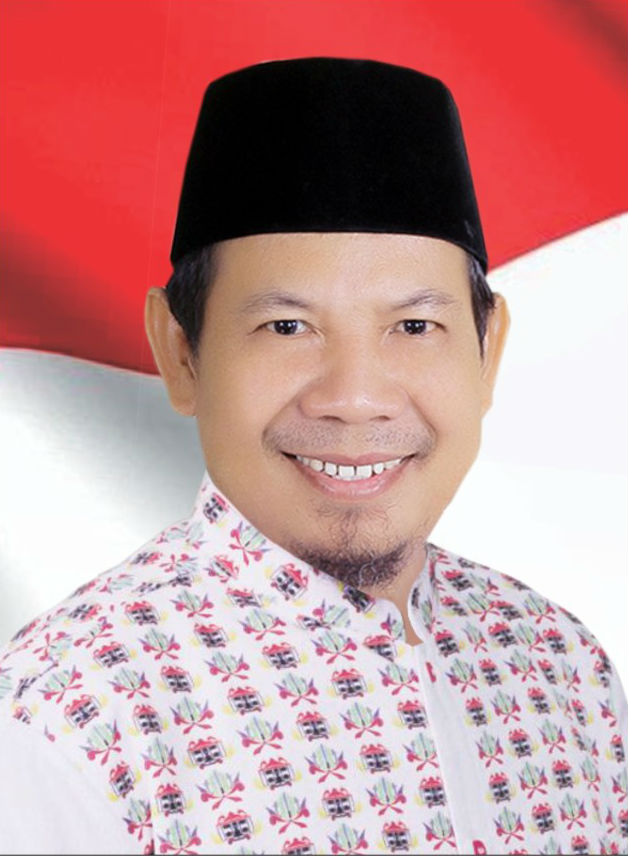
- Sa'duddin in 2017

Member of the House of Representatives
- In office 1 October 2014 – 1 October 2016
- Succeeded by: Mardani Ali Sera
- Constituency: West Java VII

12th Regent of Bekasi
- In office 14 May 2007 – 14 May 2012
- Lieutenant: Darip Mulyana
- Preceded by: Saleh Manaf; Herry Koesaeri (acting); Tenny Wishramwan (acting); Herry Koesaeri (acting)
- Succeeded by: Neneng Hassanah Yasin

Personal details
- Born: 9 April 1968 North Tambun, Bekasi, West Java, Indonesia
- Died: 16 May 2021 (aged 53) Depok, West Java, Indonesia
- Party: PKS
- Spouse: Cucu Sugiarti
- Education: Sunan Gunung Djati State Islamic University Bandung; State University of Jakarta

Sa'duddin (2 June 1961 – 16 May 2021) was an Indonesian politician and a member of the Islam-based Prosperous Justice Party (PKS). He served as member of the House of Representatives from 2014 until 2016.

== Political career ==
Sa'duddin was Regent of Bekasi from 2007 to 2012. During his term, he oversaw the elimination of tuition fees for students at state-run elementary and junior high schools.

In 2012, he stood for re-election with Jamal Lulail as his running mate, but lost to Golkar Party candidate Neneng Hassanah Yasin and her running mate Rohim Mintareja. Sa'duddin accused the winning candidate of practicing money politics and challenged the election result, but the Constitutional Court upheld Neneng's victory.

In 2014, Sa'duddin was elected a member of the House of Representatives for the 2014-2019 period, as a representative of PKS. He then became a member of House Commission II on home affairs, but in April 2016 switched to House Commission IV on agriculture, fisheries and food. He resigned from the national parliament later in 2016, so he could run again for the position of Bekasi regent.

In 2017, he stood for election as Bekasi regent, this time with musician Ahmad Dhani as his running mate, but they came second with 24.84% of the vote.

== Death ==
Sa'duddin died on 16 May 2021 at Hermina Hospital in Depok after suffering a lung disease.
