= Solihin G. P. =

Indonesian military officer and politician (1926–2024)

Solihin Purwanegara
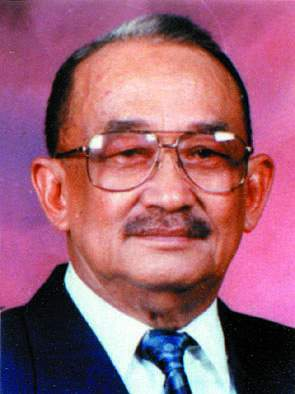
- Official portrait, 2001

8th Governor of West Java
- In office 14 February 1970 – 14 February 1975
- Preceded by: Mashudi
- Succeeded by: Aang Kunaefi

Personal details
- Born: 21 July 1926 Tasikmalaya, Dutch East Indies (now Indonesia)
- Died: 5 March 2024 (aged 97) Bandung, Indonesia

Military service
- Allegiance: Indonesia
- Branch/service: Indonesian Army
- Years of service: 1948–1968
- Rank: Lieutenant general
- Battles/wars: Indonesian National Revolution; Madiun affair; Darul Islam rebellion

Solihin Gautama Purwanegara (21 July 1926 – 5 March 2024) was an Indonesian military officer and politician who served as governor of West Java from 1970 to 1975. As a student, he joined the Indonesian Army during the national revolution. Following the recognition of Indonesian sovereignty in 1949, he served mostly within the Siliwangi Military Region before joining the Hasanuddin Military Region and later becoming its commander.

Solihin was appointed West Java's governor in 1970, and his term saw the development of regions bordering Jakarta and increased leeway in the selection of local officials. Due to disagreements with the central government, he served only a single term. He remained active in politics after his governorship, serving as advisor to President Suharto until 1993. He also briefly joined PDI-P after Suharto's downfall, and was involved in the presidential campaigns of Joko Widodo in 2014 and 2019 along with Ganjar Pranowo in 2024.

== Early life and education ==
Solihin Gautama Purwanegara was born on 21 July 1926, in Tasikmalaya, Preanger Regencies Residency, Dutch East Indies (now West Java, Indonesia). He was the son of Abdulgani Poerwanegara, a civil servant in the colonial government who had worked in Bandung and Garut, and Siti Ningrum. He studied at a colonial elementary school (Europeesche Lagere School) and for two years at a Dutch middle school (Meer Uitgebreid Lager Onderwijs).

== Military career ==
The Indonesian National Revolution broke out while he was in high school, and he joined the Indonesian Armed Forces; he took his final exams in combat uniform. He also fought against the Indonesian Communist Party following the Madiun Affair in 1948, at that time in command of a company of Tentara Pelajar (Student Army). Later on, he took part in operations against the Darul Islam rebellion in West Java. Early on, he was assigned to the Siliwangi Military Region in West Java, with an assignment in Bangka as a battalion commander from 1951 to 1953. He studied at the Army Staff and Command School between 1953 and 1954, taught there between 1954 and 1956, and then took a one-year course in the United States.

As a lieutenant colonel, he was deployed with the Indonesian "Garuda II" contingent to the United Nations Operation in the Congo after 1960. He then returned to Siliwangi and served there until 1964. He then moved to the Hasanuddin Military Region in South Sulawesi, taking part in operations against Abdul Kahar Muzakkar's Darul Islam branch. He became Hasanuddin's commander in 1965. In an anecdote given in his predecessor Mohammad Jusuf's biography, Solihin was asleep at a ceremony when Jusuf unexpectedly named Solihin as his successor, with Solihin's adjutant having to wake him up to inform him of the announcement. He was then appointed governor of the Armed Forces Army Academy (AKABRI Bagian Umum dan Darat) on 15 July 1968. His final rank in the military was lieutenant general.

== Governor ==
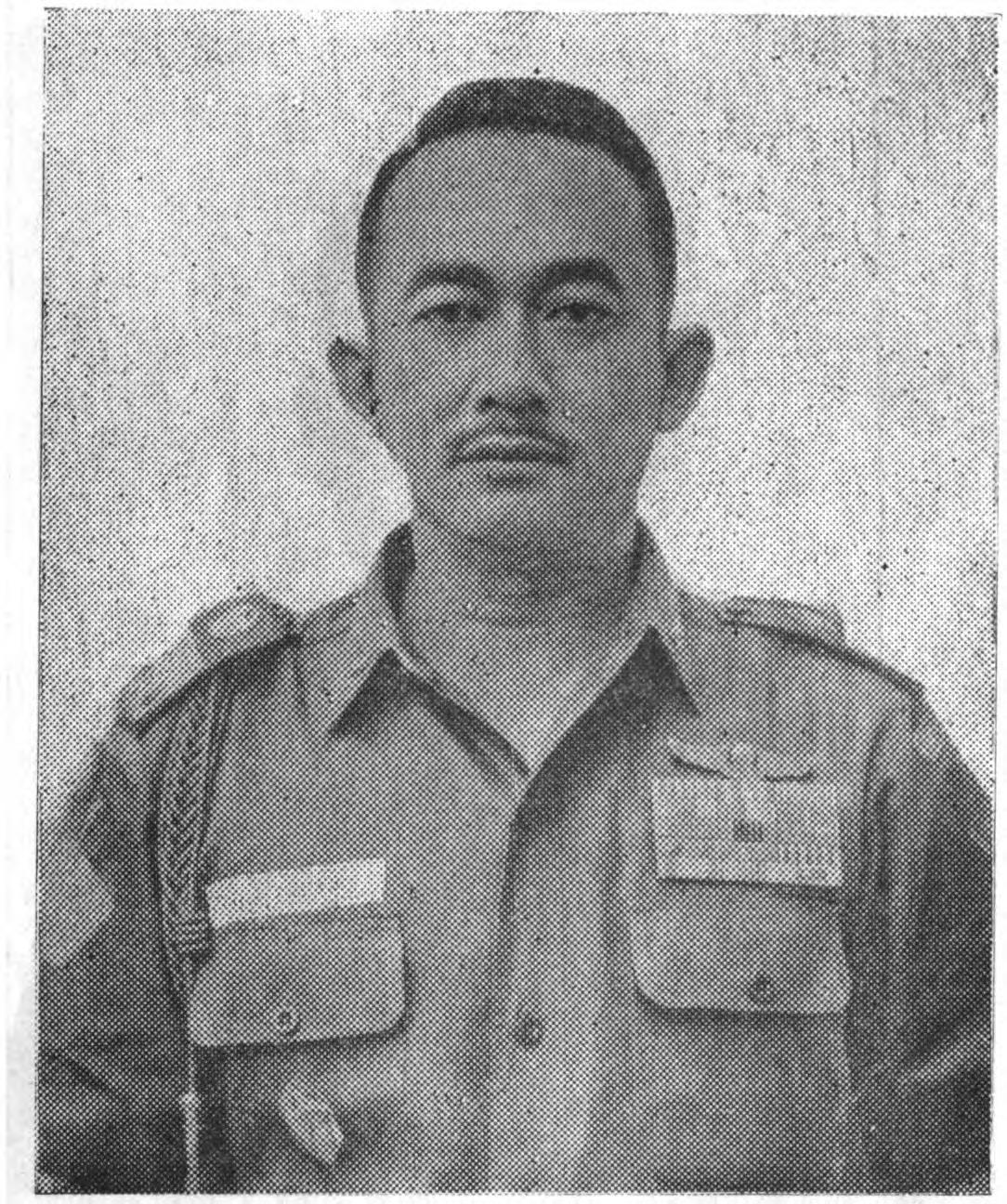
Solihin as Governor of the Armed Forces Army Academy (AKABRI Bagian Umum dan Darat), 1968

Solihin was sworn in as governor of West Java on 14 February 1970, six days after his tenure as AKABRI governor concluded. His deputy was Ahmad Nasuhi who used to be his direct superior in the armed forces during the revolution – Nasuhi was a battalion commander and Solihin was a company commander in the battalion. By Solihin's account, he was shortly thereafter invited to Jakarta by the capital's governor Ali Sadikin. During Solihin's visit there, Ali noted how the regions of West Java bordering Jakarta were underdeveloped, and remarked that the province should cede the border regions to Jakarta so that they could be better developed. Solihin noted that he took offense to this, and thus focused his attention on said regions – particularly Tangerang, Bekasi and Puncak being developed for the textile, cement, and tourist industries, respectively.

During a time of poor rice harvests in Indramayu Regency, Solihin led an effort to introduce a new planting method which reduced water requirements by farmers. He also organized a special task force to crack down on illegal gambling activities.

Unlike standard government practice in Indonesia at the time to directly select lower-ranked executive officials, Solihin permitted significant local leeway in the selection of regents during his tenure, in addition to allowing local governments more control over tax revenues. He also privatized loss-making public companies and assets, such as fallow agricultural land. Due to disagreements on these policies with Minister of Home Affairs Amir Machmud, Solihin did not continue for a second term in office, and his governorship expired on 14 February 1975.

== Later career ==
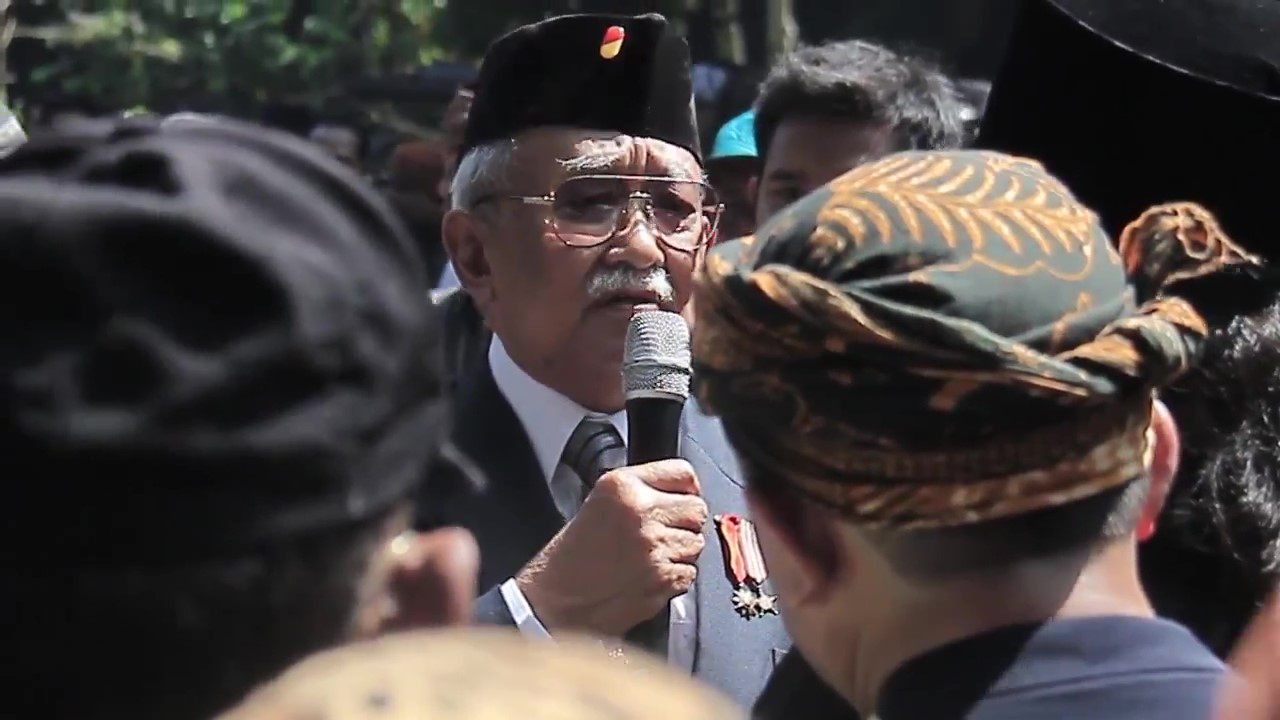
Solihin speaking in a protest against the Mayor of Bandung, 2013

After his gubernatorial career, Solihin briefly retired into a rural agricultural estate, until he was appointed Presidential Secretary for Development Operations Control in 1977. He served in this capacity until 1993, and then joined the Supreme Advisory Council and became a president commissioner at a joint venture firm between two state-owned companies. He joined PDI-P shortly after the fall of Suharto, and became a member of the People's Consultative Assembly (MPR) as a regional delegate, but left PDI-P due to disagreements regarding amendments to the Constitution of Indonesia. As a MPR member, he also opposed the formation of a special commission to audit the personal wealth of government officials, claiming that the body would be ineffective and a waste of funds. The commission itself reported Solihin to the police due to his refusal to submit an assessment of his personal assets. Between 2000 and 2004, Solihin also campaigned against a normalization project of the Ci Tanduy river bank, along with later minister Susi Pudjiastuti.

Solihin continued to receive visits from high-profile politicians after his retirement, including Susilo Bambang Yudhoyono and Joko Widodo prior to their presidential campaigns in 2004 and 2014. Solihin openly endorsed Widodo's successful runs as president in both the 2014 and 2019 elections, and was an advisor to Widodo's campaign team in 2019. For the 2024 presidential election, he was part of Ganjar Pranowo's campaign team. Solihin suffered from a light stroke in 2017 and was hospitalized, with Widodo visiting him. Widodo paid him another visit in 2018. Solihin was further infected with COVID-19 in 2021, and a hoax spread on social media reporting his death.

== Death ==
Solihin died on 5 March 2024 while receiving treatment at the Advent Hospital in Bandung due to lung and kidney diseases. He was 97. Solihin had been under care in the hospital for 15 days at the time of his death. He was buried in a military ceremony on the same day at the Cikutra Heroes' Cemetery in Bandung, after being laid in state at the headquarters of Kodam III/Siliwangi in Bandung. Solihin was survived by his wife Maryam Harmaen and four children.
