= Tentara Pelajar =

Indonesian Self-organized Student Militias

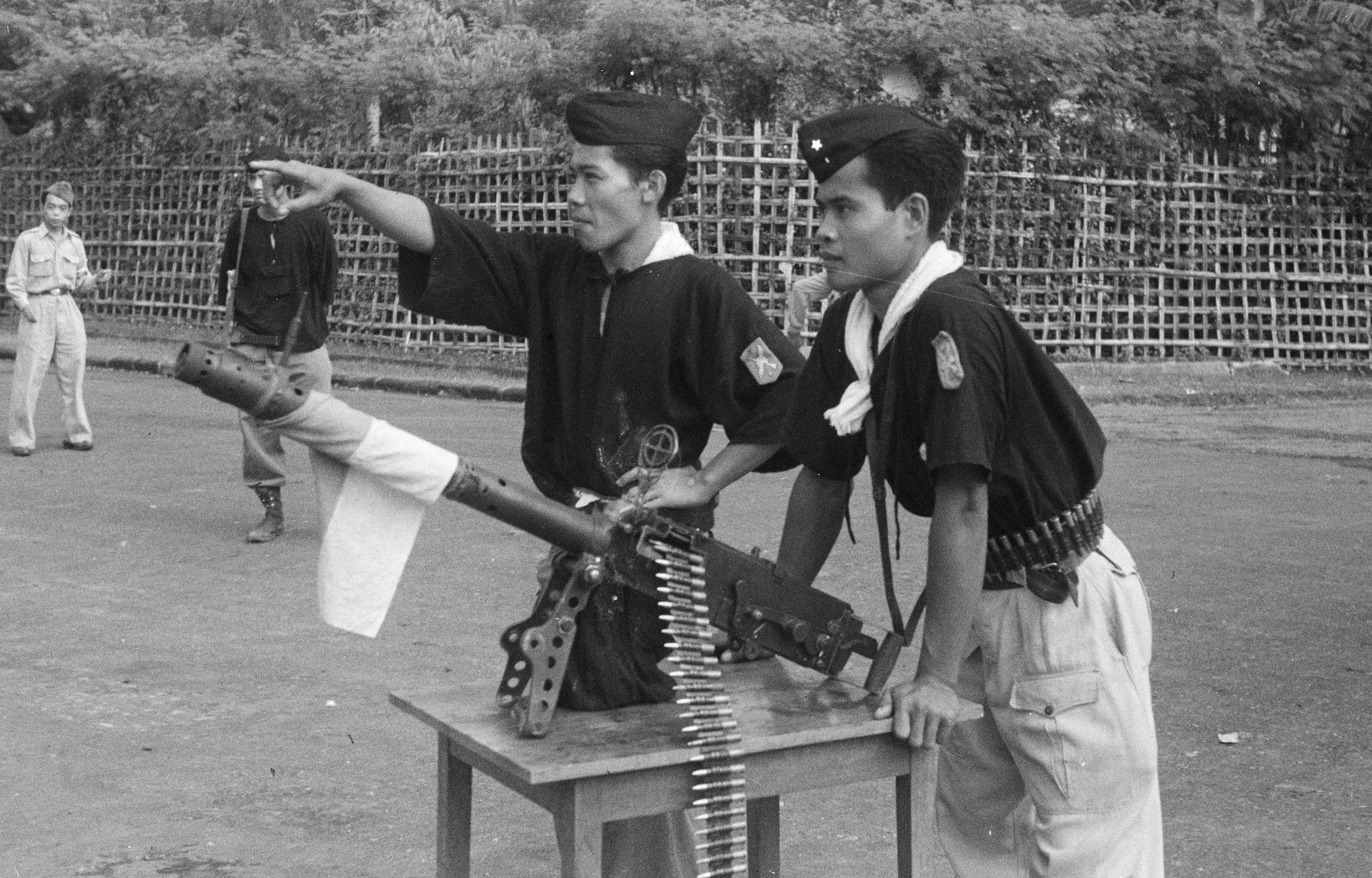
Members of Tentara Republik Indonesia Pelajar (TRIP) with a machine gun in Surakarta on 12 November 1949

Tentara Pelajar or Student's Armies, sometimes referred to as Student's Brigades is a collective name used for many small self-organized independent military units formed by students across Indonesia during Indonesian National Revolution. Consisted mostly of very young pemuda (youth) from middle to high schools between the age of 14–18, they were famous for being uncontrollable and very radical compared to other more disciplined Republican units and militia. While some units of Tentara Pelajar had centralized command and some degree of control by Indonesian military commanders, many more were simply decentralized militia or units that are formed by students themselves and act independently from the rest of Indonesian armed forces.
