= Tenny Wishramwan =

Indonesian bureaucrat (1950–2023)

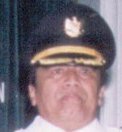

Regent of Bekasi (acting)
- In office 27 April 2006 – 19 April 2007
- Governor: Danny Setiawan
- Preceded by: Herry Koesaeri
- Succeeded by: Herry Koesaeri

Personal details
- Born: 27 March 1950 Majalengka, State of Pasundan
- Died: 6 November 2023 (aged 73) Bandung, Indonesia

Tenny Wishramwan Akim (27 March 1950 – 6 November 2023) was an Indonesian bureaucrat. He was Bekasi's acting regent for about a year from 2006 to 2007.

Tenny was born on 27 March 1950 in Majalengka, a regency in the State of Pasundan. Tenny joined the civil service of West Java upon receiving his diploma in law. He was assigned to the tourism bureau of West Java and held strategic positions in the bureau, such as the chief of program developmentand chief of marketing.

Sometime in the 2000s, Tenny became the chief of the Purwakarta Regional Coordinating Board. Following the dismissal of Saleh Manaf as Bekasi regent, he was nominated as the acting officeholder alongside incumbent regional secretary Herry Koesaeri and former regional secretary Memet Rochamat. Tenny was approved by the governor, and he became Bekasi's acting regent from 27 April 2006 until 19 April 2007.

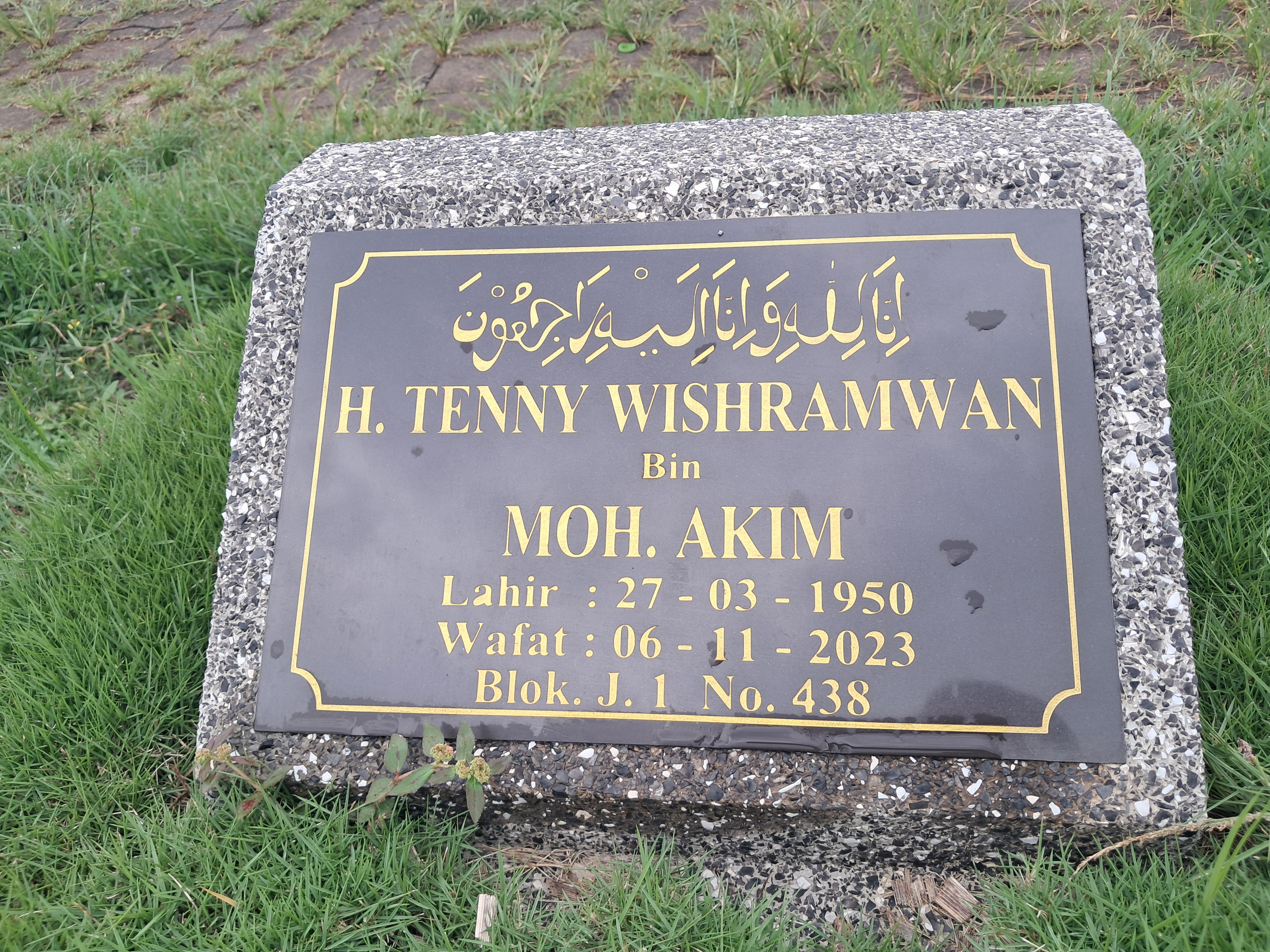
Tenny Wishramwan's gravestone.

Tenny died on 6 November 2023 in Bandung.
