= Aang Kunaefi =

Indonesian military officer (1922–1999)

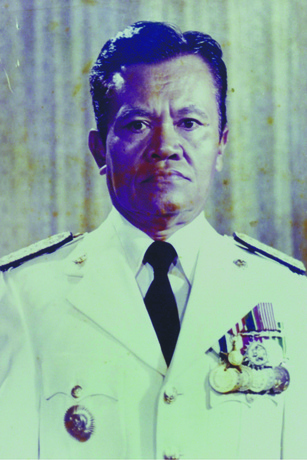

Ambassador of Indonesia to Saudi Arabia
- In office 1985–1989

Governor of West Java
- In office 16 January 1975 – 1985
- Preceded by: Solihin G. P.
- Succeeded by: Yogie Suardi Memet

Personal details
- Born: 5 December 1922 Bandung, Dutch East Indies
- Died: 12 November 1999 (aged 76)

Military service
- Allegiance: Indonesia
- Branch/service: Indonesian Army
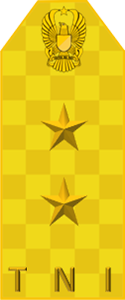
- Rank: Major general

Aang Kunaefi (5 December 1922 – 12 November 1999) was an Indonesian military officer and diplomat who served as Governor of West Java between 1975 and 1985 and as Indonesian Ambassador to Saudi Arabia. He had previously commanded the Siliwangi Military Region during his time in the Indonesian Army.

== Biography ==
Kunaefi was born in Bandung on 5 December 1922. He completed education from the Dutch colonial elementary school (Hollandsch-Inlandsche School) and middle schools (Meer Uitgebreid Lager Onderwijs). Prior to the proclamation of Indonesian independence, he for a time worked at the colonial railway department. Kunaefi joined the Indonesian Armed Forces during the Indonesian National Revolution, initially active in West Java as a supply officer before moving to Central Java and taking part in the crackdowns against the Indonesian Communist Party following the Madiun Affair. After the revolution, he served within the Siliwangi Military Region and throughout the 1950s was active at combatting the Darul Islam rebellion in West Java. He studied at the Indonesian Army Command and General Staff College (Seskoad) between 1955 and 1957. In 1958, he was part of the Indonesian military mission to Lebanon under UNOGIL. He continued to serve within Siliwangi until the 1960s, when he studied at the Frunze Military Academy between 1964 and 1966 and then lectured at Seskoad between 1966 and 1970. He was then appointed as chief of staff of Kodam Iskandar Muda in Aceh, and then further promoted to become commander of Siliwangi in 1974.

On 16 January 1975, Kunaefi was appointed as the governor of West Java. In May 1976, Kunaefi and Governor of Jakarta Ali Sadikin established a committee which coordinated both provinces in the development of the Jakarta Metropolitan Area. In response to the controversy surrounding the then-newly invented Jaipongan dance, seen by segments of Sundanese society as too erotic, Kunaefi banned the dance from being performed at official events held by his office or at the gubernatorial building. He was sworn in for his second term on 17 May 1980.

In 1985, after his gubernatorial tenure, Kunaefi was appointed as Indonesian Ambassador to Saudi Arabia, Oman, and Yemen. During his ambassadorship, Kunaefi proposed a reduction in the number of unskilled Indonesian workers being sent to Saudi Arabia. He was also part of the boards of commissioners of Indocement and Indofood.

He died on 12 November 1999.
