= Mashudi =

Indonesian politician (1919–2005)

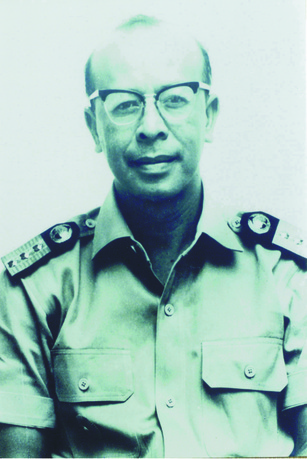
- Mashudi as Governor of West Java

3rd Chief Scout of the Pramuka Movement
- In office 18 December 1978 – 8 May 1993
- President: Suharto
- Preceded by: M. Sarbini
- Succeeded by: Himawan Sutanto

Governor of West Java
- In office 1960–1970
- Preceded by: Ipik Gandamana
- Succeeded by: Solihin G. P.

Personal details
- Born: September 11, 1919 Cibatu, Garut Regency, West Java, Dutch East Indies
- Died: June 22, 2005 (aged 85) Jakarta, Indonesia

Military service
- Allegiance: Indonesia
- Branch/service: Indonesian Army
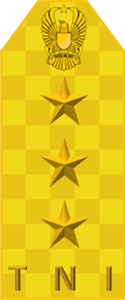
- Rank: Lieutenant General
- Unit: Infantry

Lieutenant General Mashudi (September 11, 1919 – June 22, 2005) was an Indonesian politician who was Governor of West Java. He also served as Vice Chairman of the People's Consultative Assembly (1967–1972).

In 1974, he became Chairman of the West Java Scout Council, and was elected Vice-Chairman of the national headquarters (Kwarnas) of the Gerakan Pramuka. At the National Scout Conference in Bukittinggi, West Sumatra in 1978, he was elected by acclamation as Chairman, in which position he served until 1993.

In 1985, Mashudi was awarded the 181st Bronze Wolf, the only distinction of the World Organization of the Scout Movement, awarded by the World Scout Committee for exceptional services to world Scouting.
