= Nana Nuriana =

Indonesian politician (1938–2024)

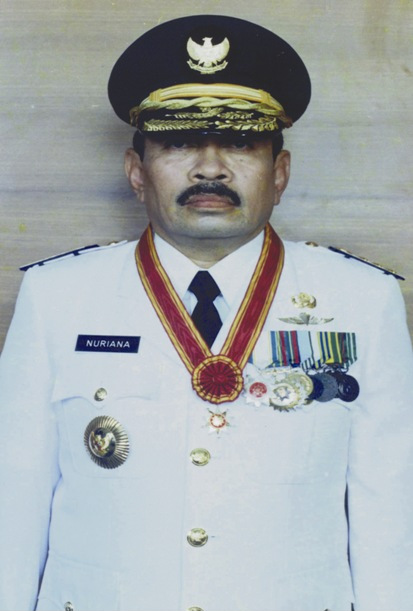
- Nuriana as governor

Governor of West Java
- In office 22 May 1993 – 13 June 2003
- Preceded by: Yogie Suardi Memet
- Succeeded by: Danny Setiawan

Personal details
- Born: 17 April 1938 Sumedang, Dutch East Indies
- Died: 11 July 2024 (aged 86) Bandung, West Java, Indonesia
- Party: Golkar (1967–2005)

Military service
- Allegiance: Indonesia
- Branch/service: Indonesian Army
- Rank: Major general

Nana Nuriana (17 April 1938 – 11 July 2024) was an Indonesian military officer who also served as the Governor of West Java for two terms between 1993 and 2003. His tenure as governor saw the initial development of Jonggol, as a potential new national capital prior to the idea being scrapped due to the Asian financial crisis, and the secession of Banten as its own province in his second term.

== Early life and military career ==
Nuriana was born in Sumedang on 17 April 1938. After graduating from high school, he studied geology at the Bandung Institute of Technology, but did not complete his studies there. Instead, he enrolled at the Indonesian Military Academy, graduating in 1962.

Out from the academy, he became a second lieutenant in the Indonesian Army and was posted at a battalion in Cimahi as a military district (rayon) commander. After gradually rising up the military ranks, Nuriana became chief of staff of Kodam VII/Wirabuana, headquartered in Makassar, then became the commander of the West Java-based Kodam III/Siliwangi in 1991.

== As governor ==
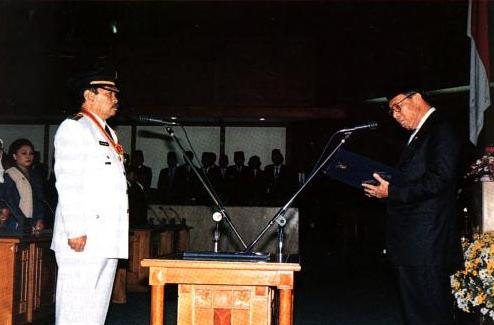
Nuriana being sworn in for his second term, 8 August 1998.

On 22 May 1993, Nuriana was sworn in as the governor of West Java after his election by the provincial council with 68 of 99 votes. At that time, he held the rank of major general. He succeeded his former superior in Siliwangi, Yogie Suardi Memet.

During this term, he was appointed head of the development control agency for Jonggol, which was then planned as the new capital of Indonesia. According to Nuriana in 1996, the new city would cover 15 thousand hectares with another 15 thousand set aside for nature preserves and agriculture.

Jonggol was also slated to host West Java's provincial government. However, the plans were scrapped due to the Asian financial crisis, which struck Indonesia in 1997.

When he ran for reelection in 1998, the Reformasi movement was in full swing, and his candidacy was challenged with sixteen potential gubernatorial candidates (Nuriana included) running for the office. Despite this, Nuriana still managed to win reelection with 70 out of 96 votes. He was sworn in for his second term on 8 August 1998.

During his second term, Nuriana faced a secessionist movement from Banten, with Banten's local politicians and figures wanting to form a separate province. Nuriana opposed this movement, as he feared that Banten's secession would reduce the revenue base of West Java. He also argued against the secessionists, claiming that the West Java government had made substantial investments in developing regions in Banten such as the cities of Serang and Tangerang in addition to rural regions. However, Nuriana was politically weakened at that point, with several ongoing corruption investigations against him. Banten eventually seceded as a separate province in 2000.

== Later life and death ==
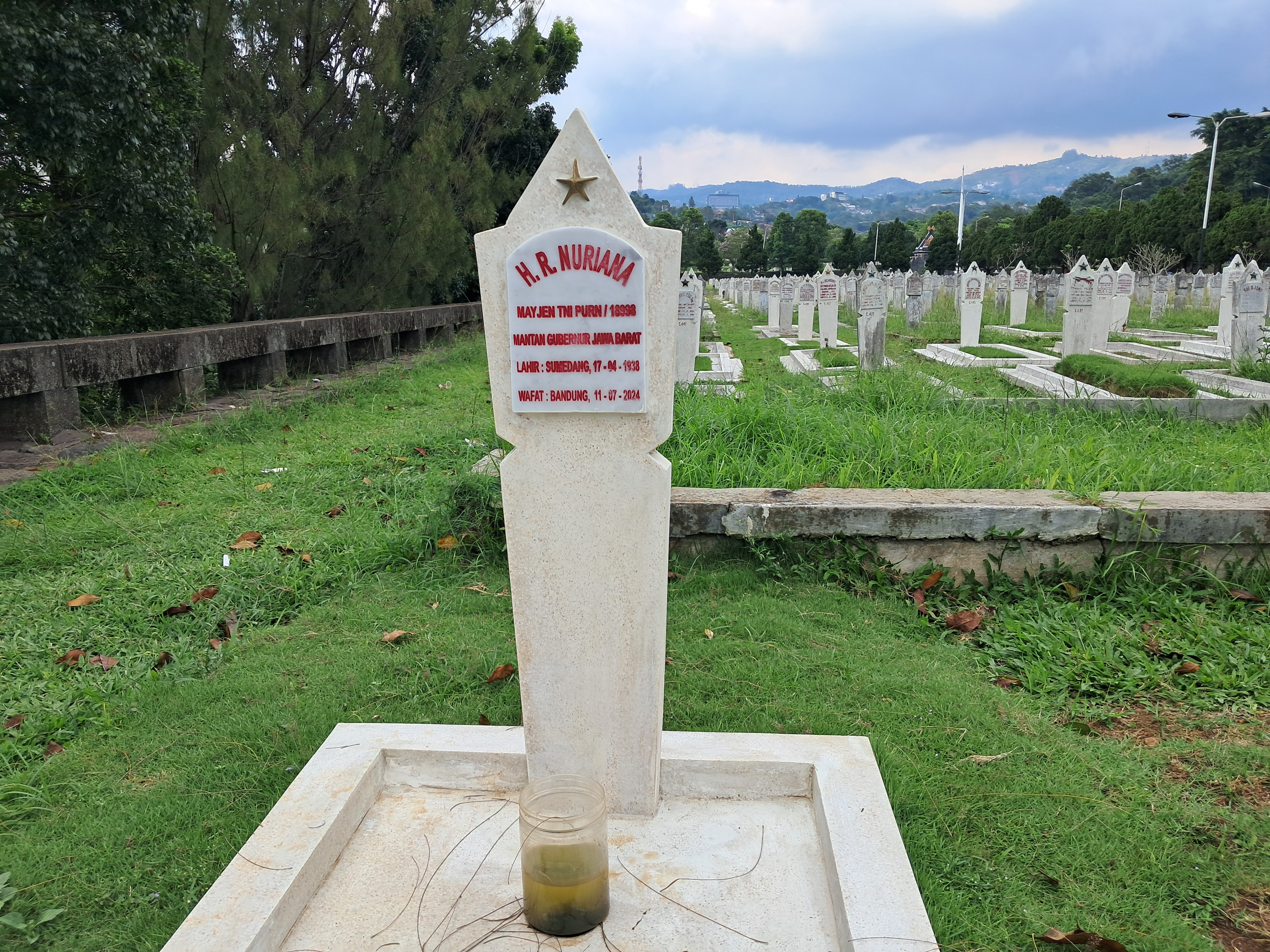
Nana Nuriana's grave at Cikutra.

After the end of his tenure as governor, he was investigated for corruption charges by the Provincial Prosecution Service in 2001, and later by the Corruption Eradication Commission in 2006 and 2009.

Nuriana died in Bandung on 11 July 2024, at the age of 86. He was buried on the same day at the Cikutra Heroes' Cemetery in the city.
