= Danny Setiawan =

Indonesian politician and civil servant (1945–2026)

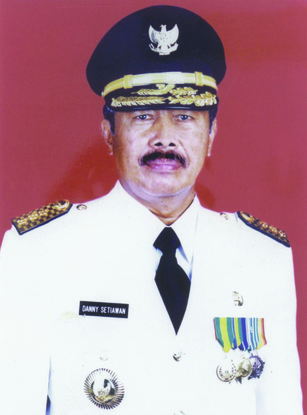
- Setiawan as governor

Governor of West Java
- In office 13 June 2003 – 13 June 2008
- Preceded by: Nana Nuriana
- Succeeded by: Ahmad Heryawan

Personal details
- Born: 28 August 1945 Purwakarta, West Java, Indonesia
- Died: 19 September 2026 (aged 81) Bandung, West Java, Indonesia
- Party: Golkar

Danny Setiawan (28 August 1945 – 19 September 2026) was an Indonesian politician and civil servant who served as the governor of West Java between 2003 and 2008. Prior to this position, he had served in various positions as a civil servant for 35 years. After the end of his tenure in 2008, he was arrested and later sentenced to four years in prison for a corruption case, and he was released in 2011.

== Early life ==
Setiawan was born in Purwakarta on 28 August 1945. As his father was a soldier, Setiawan frequently moved in his childhood following his father's postings, and he completed elementary school in Cirebon, middle school in Bogor, and high school in Purwakarta. He then enrolled at the Interior Government Academy (APDN) in Bandung, graduating in 1968.

== Career ==
After his graduation, he was recruited to become an adjutant to the regent in Lebak Regency. After a year, he was reassigned to the local government in Manokwari before returning to Lebak, where he worked for over 10 years until his move into the provincial government in Bandung by 1984. He headed a variety of provincial departments, until he was appointed the provincial secretary in 1998. He held this post until 2003.

=== Governor ===
In May 2003, with gubernatorial elections incoming, Setiawan secured the support of Golkar to run. Against him was PDI-P-backed retired major general Tayo Tarmadi, formerly commander of West Java-based Kodam Siliwangi. Despite Tarmadi's military background, however, the 10 of 100 members of the West Java Regional People's Representative Council hailing from the military refused to support him. With implicit military backing, Setiawan was eventually elected as governor of West Java after winning 49 of 88 available votes, the military representatives abstaining in the vote. His term began on 13 June 2003, and was the first governor of the province to not hail from a military background.

He ran for reelection in the direct elections of 2008, but placed last of three candidates, behind winner Ahmad Heryawan and runner-up Agum Gumelar.

== Arrest and imprisonment ==
On 21 July 2008, the Corruption Eradication Commission named Setiawan as a suspect of corruption in the procurement of firetrucks during his tenure. After investigation, he was taken into custody on 10 November 2008. He was sentenced to four years' imprisonment on 30 June 2009, and was additionally fined Rp 100 million. He was released on parole on 18 February 2011, although his full sentence was supposed to expire on 3 November 2012.

== Death ==
Setiawan died at his house in Bandung on 19 September 2026, aged 81. He was buried at his family cemetery in Purwakarta Regency.
