= 2003 Yalengga raid =

2003 Military Raid

Yalengga Raid
- Part of the Papua conflict
Date	6 November 2003
Location	Yalengga, Jayawijaya Regency, Highland Papua
Result	Indonesian victory; Most of the OPM weaponry and documents were captured by Indonesian forces; Indonesian forces halted the OPM attacks on Wamena

Belligerents
Indonesia	(Free Papua Movement) West Papua National Liberation Army

Commanders and leaders
(Indonesia) Col. Gustav Agus Irianto	(Free Papua Movement) Yustinus Murib †

Units involved
Kopassus	Unknown

Strength
60 soldiers	40 Rebels

Casualties and losses
Light casualties	10 killed
- 1 civilian killed

The Yalengga Raid was a military raid conducted by Kopassus against the OPM on Jayawijaya Regency, Highland Papua and also halted the OPM attacks on Wamena. The raid resulted in killing the most-wanted OPM commander Yustinus Murib and seizure of most of the OPM's weapons and documents.

== Raid ==
On 6 November 2003 at 5 AM Indonesian forces led by Colonel Gustav Agus Irianto blockaded and attacked Yalengga district, Jayawijaya Regency. The Indonesian forces forced the OPM companies to retreat. However the Indonesian force was supposed to suppress OPM attacks to Wamena. An estimated 50-60 Indonesian personnel stormed OPM headquarters at Kwiyage. The Indonesians killed OPM leaderYustinus Murib and captured OPM weaponry and OPM documents about the plan of assaults on Wamena.

== Aftermath ==
After the raid, the body of Yustinus Murib was beheaded and his head displayed as a trophy. The Indonesian government claimed the raid was an retaliation for an OPM attack on civilians around Wamena. After the raid, OPM forces continued to retreat.
