= Giay =

Giay is a surname. Notable people with the surname include:

- Agustín Giay (born 2004), Argentine footballer
- Benny Giay (born 1955), Indonesian activist
- Giovanni Antonio Giay (1690–1764), Italian composer
