= Garda Muda Penegak Integrasi =

Indonesian paramilitary group

The Garda Muda Penegak Integrasi (English: Youth Guard for Upholding Integration), sometimes shortened to Gadapaksi was an Indonesian paramilitary group.

It is thought to have had links with the Indonesian Special Forces group Kopassus. There are reports that it participated in joint actions with the Indonesian army in the conflict in East Timor.
