= Cebongan Prison raid =

The Cebongan Prison raid was an action undertaken by members of Indonesian Army special forces (Kopassus) when they attacked Cebongan Penitentiary Institution (Lembaga Pemasyarakatan Cebongan or LP Cebongan) in Sleman Regency, Special Region of Yogyakarta, Indonesia, on 23 March 2013. Four detainees suspected of murdering a former Kopassus sergeant were killed in the attack. The National Commission on Human Rights (Komnas HAM) investigated and concluded that the attack had been a human rights violation, though this was disputed by Defense Minister Purnomo Yusgiantoro.

== Raid ==
"Once I knew that these four detainees were the suspects allegedly involved in the murder of a soldier, I began to worry. I remember how angry soldiers set fire to the Ogan Komering Ulu (OKU) Police headquarters recently."

— Cebongan chief warden Sukamto Harto

Four men—Hendrik Angel Sahetapi, Adrianus Candra Galaga, Yohanes Juan Mambait and Gamaliel Yermiayanto Rohi Riwu—were being held at Cebongan Prison on suspicion of having murdered former Kopassus First Sergeant Heru Santoso in a Yogyakarta café with a broken bottle. Yohanes was reported to be an officer with the Yogyakarta police. Santoso's murder took place on 19 March 2013, and the suspects were transferred to Cebongan on 22 March. The prison's chief warden, Sukamto Harto, later stated that he had been planning to return to the detainees to the police station after learning of their crime, fearing a military raid in retaliation.

At 12:30 a.m. on 23 March 2013, a group of armed men in masks arrived at the prison gate claiming to be police detectives and demanding to see the four. They then forced their way into the prison at gunpoint, disabling the CCTV cameras, cutting the phone service, and securing the perimeter. The prison officers were ordered to take the gunmen to the four's holding cell; one guard who refused to comply with the instructions was beaten. Other inmates along the route were threatened. When the gunmen reached the cell, they executed the four suspects with shots to the head. Seven prison officers were injured during the attack.

== Investigation ==
Law and Human Rights Minister Amir Syamsuddin visited the prison the day of the murders and announced an investigation. Deputy Law and Human Rights Minister Denny Indrayana stated that due to the coordination of the attack, it appeared likely that the attackers had military backgrounds.

On 5 April 2013, a group of Kopassus members confessed to the attack, stating that it had been a revenge killing for Santoso's death. The military stated that 11 men had participated, while Komnas HAM put the number at 14.

In its report on the incident, Komnas HAM ruled that the attack had included various human rights violations, including the torture of guards and the intimidation of inmates. Defense Minister Purnomo Yusgiantoro disputed the findings, stating, "This is not human rights violation, I want to be firm on this ... It is not a genocide incident ... It was a spontaneous action from military members. There was no systemic order from their superiors on this crime." Human rights groups criticized Purnomo's statement; Commission for Missing Persons and Victims of Violence member Yati Andriyani stated that the authority to make this determination rested solely with Komnas HAM, not with the defense minister.

== Trial ==
Eleven members of the Kopassus were charged for their roles in the attack. Despite calls for the trial to be held in a civilian court, Purnomo ruled that the case would be tried in military prison but open to the public.
