= Operation Merapi =

1965 military operation in Indonesia

- Part of Indonesian mass killings of 1965–66
- Map of Central Java in Indonesia
Date	December 1, 1965
Location	Central Java, Indonesia
Result	Indonesian government victory

Belligerents
Indonesia; TNI	PKI

Commanders and leaders
(Indonesia) Sukarno (Indonesia) Suharto (Indonesia) Sarwo Edhie Wibowo	Usman †; Samadi †; R.W. Sukirno †; Sukirno †; Maryono †; Sahirman †

Operation Merapi was an operation conducted by the RPKAD on December 1, 1965, under the leadership of Colonel Sarwo Edhie Wibowo to assist the IV Military Regional Command/Diponegoro against the Communist Party of Indonesia in Central Java following the aftermath of the 30 September Movement and the early phases of the Anti Communist purges against the party. The operation marked a pivotal effort to restore stability in the region.

== Background ==
After the failure of the 30 September Movement, Suharto and his associates immediately blamed the Communist Party of Indonesia as masterminds of the coup attempt. Anti-PKI demonstrations and then violence soon broke out. On October 3, 1965, President Sukarno appointed Major General Soeharto to lead operations aimed at restoring security and order following the coup attempt. On October 10, 1965, Suharto established the Kopkamtib to conduct various operations including operation merapi against the Communist Party of Indonesia.

On 1 December 1965 to cleaned the rest of PKI powers in Central Java Col, Sarwo Edhie Wibowo form the composite commando of the operations before executed the operations. The composite commandos of Operation Merapi;

1. Colonel Sarwo Edhie Wibowo (Commander)
2. Major Taher (Section 1)
3. Major Sutjipto (Section 2)
4. Major C.I Santoso and Captain Darjono (Executor)

== Operation ==
Although the VII/Diponegoro Military Region Commander had reclaimed Central Java from G30S members by October 5, 1965, the RPKAD also played a crucial role in assisting to maintain stability in the region.

Meanwhile the PKI committed mass murders and attacks on Surakarta, Boyolali, and Klaten. The RPKAD forces responded to the PKI actions by training hundreds youth to use weapons and secured their villages and families from PKI attacks. They were also trained by RPKAD forces to gathered information to help the RPKAD forces during the operations. This strategy was successful crackdown on PKI members.

On the 8 December 1965 the RPKAD forces received news that Colonel Sahirman and his forces were hidden on Mount Merbabu, to carry out the chasing operations. The RPKAD made contact with Battalion E in Boyolali Regency. On 9 December 1965 one platoon from Yonif E led by Lieutenant Tarwan moved to Cemorosewu on the slopes of Mount Merbabu on the east side, the forces were accompanied by the trained youths from Ampel. At 5 A.M the forces ambushed the wanted companies and killed most of them, they also captured the Gerwani called Lestari and seized the pistols of Lieutenant Colonel Usman Sastrodibroto. At 11 A.M the RPKAD checked the dead people after the actions at Cemorosewu and found the bodies of Sastrodibroto, Major Sumadi ,Captain Sukirno, Darmin, and Edi Bagiyo. At the same time the trained youth also captured Lieutenant Soekarno. On 10 December the RPKAD forces captured Pawirodono and seized the sten and on 13 December 1965 the RPKAD forces continued their operations.

By the pressures of RPKAD forces and Battalion E who also joined this operations with the help of trained youths, Sahirman and his men was not able to escape from RPKAD pressure. On 14 December 1965 Colonel Sahirman, Colonel Maryono, and Major R.W Sakirno decided to leave Mount Merbabu, and at the same time were ambushed and executed.

Operation Merapi not only served as an effort to assist the VII/Diponegoro Military Region Commander but also as a direct response to threats posed by PKI elements in the area. During its execution, the RPKAD took decisive action, eliminating several key figures, including Colonel Usman, Major Samadi, Major R.W. Sukirno and Captain Sukarno
