= I Gusti Putu Danny Nugraha Karya =

Indonesian Major General (1969-2021

Major General I Gusti Putu Danny Nugraha Karya
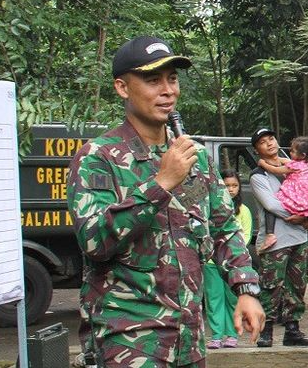
- Major General I Gusti Putu Danny Nugraha Karya while serving in Kopassus.

Head of Papua Regional State Intelligence Agency (Kabinda Papua)
- In office 18 June 2020 – 19 April 2021
- President: Joko Widodo
- Preceded by: Brigjen Abdul Haris Napoleon
- Succeeded by: Brigjen Abdul Haris Napoleon

Personal details
- Born: I Gusti Putu Danny Nugraha Karya; 7 December 1969 Bandung, West Java, Indonesia
- Died: 25 April 2021 (aged 51) Beoga Valley, Puncak Regency, Central Papua, Indonesia

Military service
- Allegiance: Indonesia
- Branch/service: Indonesian Army; Indonesian State Intelligence Agency
- Years of service: 1993–2021
- Rank: Major General (Posthumously Promoted); Brigadier General
- Unit: Kopassus
- Commands: Head of Papua Regional State Intelligence Agency (Kabinda Papua); Senior Officer of the Detachment Headquarters of the Indonesian National Armed Forces (Pamen Denma Mabesad); Intelligence Assistant (Asintel) of Kodam Jaya; Head of Expert Staff Group (Kapok Sahli)
- Battles/wars: Papua Conflict †

Major General I Gusti Putu Danny Nugraha Karya (7 December 1969 - 25 April 2021) was an Indonesian major general who previously served as the Head of Regional State Intelligence Agency (Kepala BIN Daerah (Kabinda)) until his death in combat. He replaced the late Brigjen Abdul Haris Napoleon who at the time, was appointed Expert Staff for Ideology and Politics at BIN. Following Danny's death, Napoleon was subsequently reappointed as Kabinda and served until he died due to a heart attack in 2022.

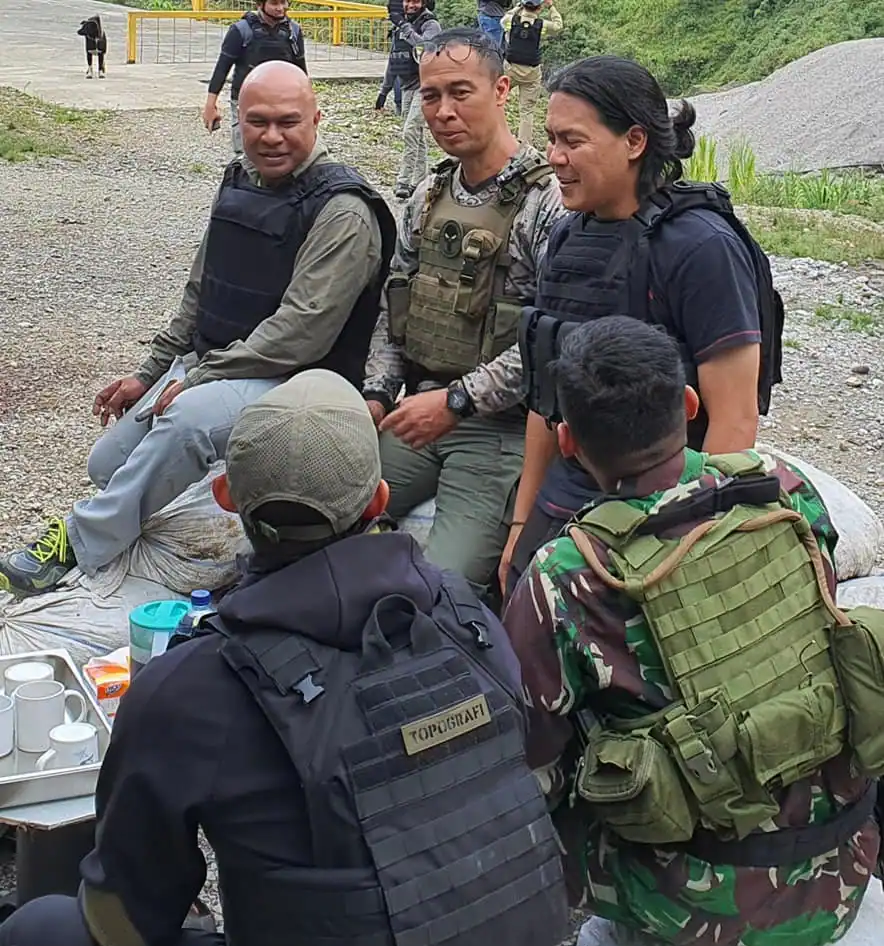
Danny (2nd from Top-left) with subordinates.

== Death ==
Being a Kopassus officer for most of his career, Danny was known for his hands on approach towards his deployments. He often led and mingled with his subordinates in the field directly instead of a command center. Due to his unorthodox method of leading, he was exposed to more danger when compared with other high-ranking officers. This danger culminated during an operation in the Puncak Regency when a BIN Task Force together with a TNI-POLRI Task Force traveled to Dambet Village, Beoga District, Puncak Regency for field observations, a joint pursuit of separtists elements, and to restore security around an elementary school SDN Dambet and Honai which were burned on 17 April 2021 by separtists. This operation acted as a direct response to cut off the movement of the separatists' groups to the nearby Illaga.

According to a BIN spokesperson, his attendance on the field also "functioned as an effort to increase the morale and enthusiasm of the people who have been troubled by the cruelty and savagery of the KST (Separatist & Terrorist Group) Papua." At around 15.30 PM Eastern Indonesian Time (WIT), the joint convoy of BIN, TNI, and POLRI task force which was enroute towards the Dambet Village church was intercepted and ambushed by an unknown number of separatists. As the BIN spokesperson, Wawan Purwanto, stated, "During the intense firefight, Danny was hit by a bullet at the back of his head and it penetrated into the front of his head which resulted in his subsequent death."

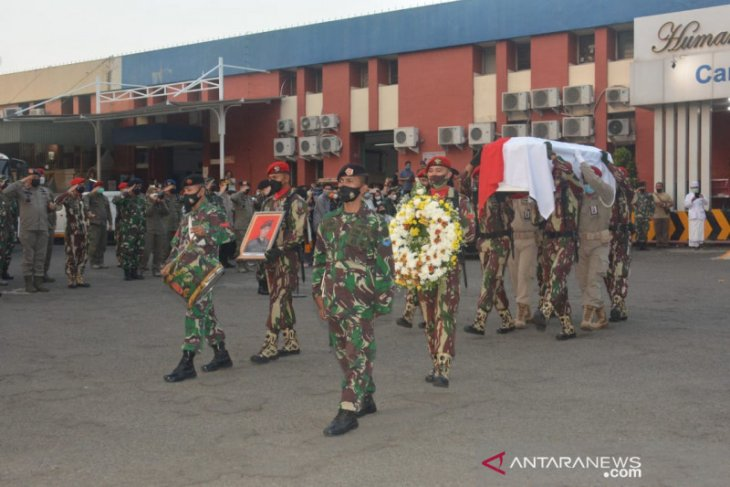
The casket of the late I Gusti Putu Danny Nugraha Karya being escorted by members of Kopassus after its arrival in Halim Airport, Jakarta.

After the incident, Danny was taken to the Beoga Health Center where he was pronounced dead. The security forces could not immediately bring the body to Timika due to the deteriorating weather and poor communication network. The Beoga Police Chief, Ipda Ali Akbar, stated that "It's too late, the planes don't dare to enter. The plan is to evacuate tomorrow at 6 am using the Caracal helicopter belonging to the TNI." Danny's evacuation took place on Monday morning, 26 April where Danny's body was taken from Puncak Regency to Timika and upon arrival in Timika, Danny was flown to Jakarta to be buried at the Kalibata Heroes' Cemetery (TMP).

He was posthumously promoted to major general for his services by President Joko Widodo.

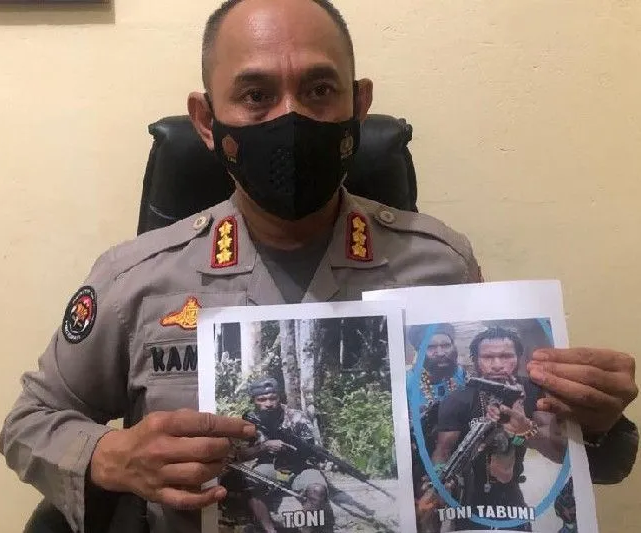
Police Chief Commissioner Ahmad Mustofa Kamal Holds Pictures of Separatists

== Perpetrators ==
On 28 March 2022, a joint TNI-POLRI task force under Operation Cartenzs' Peace, arrested two separatists, one of whom was accused of being the perpetrator of the shooting that killed the late Danny Nugraha Karya. Commander of the task force, Ahmad Kamal, stated that "The arrest of the two OPM members, namely Toni Tabuni (age 24) and Kais Tabuni (age 25) was carried out, Tuesday 28th of March in Nabire." The arrest took place in the Siriwini area, Nabire. During the arrest, Toni Tabuni resisted which resulted in his death. Meanwhile, Kais Tabuni was held at the Nabire Police Station, Kamal added that Toni Tabuni is the leader of the Ndeotadi OPM (Free Papua Organization) cell.

The duo has been involved in 9 separate crimes such as the following:

1. The shooting that resulted in I Gusti Putu Danny Nugraha Karya's death.
2. The shooting between OPM Ilaga cell and Paskhas at Aminggaru Airport on February 19, 2020, which injured Head Private, Firman Hermansyah.
3. Involved in the shooting of Yonif 408/Sbh Koramil Dambet Task Force personnel, injuring Private First Class Heriyanto on March 3, 2020.
4. The theft with violence against Police Station 99 Ndeotadi personnel on 15 May 2020 which resulted in First Brigadier Cristian Palling being stabbed in the head and body along with the seizure of weapons (2 pieces of SS1 rifles and 1 AK-type rifle).
5. The shooting of a COVID Task Force officer in Intan Jaya Regency on May 22, 2020, causing the death of two COVID task force members.
6. The shooting that killed a Yunus Sani at the Intan Jaya-Paniai border on 29 May 2020.
7. The shooting in the people's mining area of dulang 45 on 29 May 2020.
8. Arson at Bilorai Intan Jaya Airport on October 29, 2021.
9. Involvement in a shootout with a joint TNI-Polri team at Sugapa Intan Jaya on November 5, 2021, which killed an OPM member Oce Belau.
