= Kopassus =

Special forces unit of the Indonesian Army

Special Forces Command
- Komando Pasukan Khusus (Kopassus)
- Insignia of the Kopassus
- Active: 16 April 1952; 74 years ago)
- Country: Indonesia
- Branch: Indonesian Army
- Type: Army Special Forces
- Role: Group 1 & 2 – Para Commandos specializing in Special operations, Jungle warfare, Unconventional warfare, Counter-insurgency, Special reconnaissance, and Direct action tasks; Group 4 – Combat Intelligence and Clandestine; Group 5, Also known as SAT-81 Gultor – Counter Terrorism
- Size: Division
- Part of: Indonesian National Armed Forces
- Garrison/HQ: Cijantung, Jakarta
- Nicknames: Hantu Rimba (Ghost of the Jungle), Baret Merah (Red Berets), Komando
- Mottos: Berani, Benar, Berhasil ("Brave, Rightful, Successful")
- Anniversaries: 16 April
- Engagements: Regional rebellions 1950s; Darul Islam rebellion; PRRI rebellion; Permesta rebellion; South Maluku Rebellion; Invasion of Ambon; Operation Trikora; Papua conflict (1962–present); Mapenduma hostage crisis (1996); Operation Cartenz's Peace; Indonesia–Malaysia Confrontation (1963–1966); Indonesian killings of 1965-66; 30 September Movement; Operation Merapi; Operation Security and Order; Communist insurgency in West Kalimantan (1967–1974); East Timor military campaign (Operation Seroja) 1975; Insurgency in Aceh (1976–2004); The Hijacking of Garuda Flight GA 206 (Woyla Operation) 1981; 1998 Jakarta riots (alleged); Poso riots (1998–2001); 1999 East Timorese crisis; Maluku sectarian conflict (1999–2002); Maluku Sovereignty Front Rebellion (2000–present); Capture of Omar al-Faruq (2002) part of war on terror; MV Sinar Kudus Hijacking (2011); Operation Madago Raya (2016–2022); Garuda Contingent (UN peacekeeping)
- Website: kopassus.mil.id

Commanders
- Commander: Lieutenant General Djon Afriandi
- Deputy Commander: Major General Ferdial Lubis
- Notable commanders: Major Idjon Djanbi; Colonel Sarwo Edhie Wibowo; Maj.Gen. Prabowo Subianto

The Kopassus (Indonesian: Komando Pasukan Khusus, lit. 'Special Forces Command') is an Indonesian Army (TNI-AD) special forces group that conducts special operations missions for the Indonesian government, such as direct action, unconventional warfare, sabotage, counter-insurgency, counter-terrorism, intelligence gathering and special reconnaissance (SR). Kopassus was founded by Alexander Evert Kawilarang and Mochammad Idjon Djanbi on 16 April 1952. It gained worldwide attention after several operations such as the Indonesian invasion of East Timor and the release of hostages from Garuda Indonesia Flight 206.

The special forces spearheaded some of the government's military campaigns: putting down regional rebellions in the late 1950s, Operation Trikora (Western New Guinea campaign) in 1961–1962, the Indonesia-Malaysia Confrontation from 1962 to 1966, the massacres of alleged communists in 1965, the East Timor invasion in 1975, and subsequent campaigns against separatists in various provinces.

Kopassus has been reported by national and international media, human rights-affiliated NGOs and researchers to have committed violations of human rights in East Timor, Aceh, Papua and Java. In 2019, the United States announced that it would conduct a combined exercise training with Kopassus in 2020. The US had ended links with Kopassus in 1999 as the Leahy Law banned assistance to foreign military units with a history of human rights violations until those responsible are prosecuted. Kopassus has introduced internal reforms and undertaken human rights courses with the International Committee of the Red Cross. In 2018, US Secretary of Defense Jim Mattis said he wanted to lift the ban as Kopassus had reformed and removed human rights abusive soldiers. In response, Senator Patrick Leahy said Mattis needs to establish whether Kopassus has punished officers and is today "accountable to the rule of law". Human Rights Watch criticised plans to lift the ban as Kopassus officers had not been prosecuted.

== History ==
On 15 April 1952, Colonel Alexander Evert Kawilarang began to form Kesatuan Komando Tentara Territorium III/Siliwangi (Kesko TT), the early name of Kopassus and the basis for this historic special forces unit.

Not long after, Colonel Kawilarang with the use of military intelligence located and met with Idjon Djanbi—a former member of the Dutch Special Forces who had remained in newly independent Indonesia, settled in West Java, married an Indonesian woman, and was known locally as Mochammad Idjon Djanbi. He was the first recruit for the Indonesian special forces, as well as its first commander. Due to him, the unit which later became Kopassus wear red berets (color traditionally favored by airborne troops in Europe) instead of the distinctive green beret.

At that time, Indonesia's special force name was Kesatuan Komando Tentara Territorium / Kesko TT) (3rd Territorial Army Command Commando Unit). Kopassus was the final result of five name changes: Kesko TT, KKAD (Kesatuan Komando Angkatan Darat, Army Commando Forces Unit), RPKAD (Resimen Para Komando Angkatan Darat, Army Para-Commando Regiment), Puspassus (Army Special Forces Department) and Kopassandha. (Note: Komando Pasukan Sandi Yudha; Sandhi Yudha roughly translated as "secret or covert warrior", translated as Special Forces Corps.) The first generation of this force was only around a hundred soldiers or one company, headquartered in Bandung. Among its pioneer instructors was a young veteran of the Indonesian National Revolution, future Minister of Defense Leonardus Benjamin Moerdani, who later became a battalion commander and later led his paratroopers to crush the two twin rebellions in 1957–58 by the Revolutionary Government of the Republic of Indonesia and Permesta.

As the RPKAD, a name used in the 1960s, and expanded into a three-battalion special forces airborne regiment, the force was involved in the widespread killings during General Suharto's rise to power. An estimated half-a million people were killed in the anti-communist purge with strong communal overtones.

The RPKAD was involved in wiping out entire villages such as Kesiman (east of Denpasar) in Bali, many of them in beach areas which later becomes major tourist resorts.

The unit also saw action during the Indonesia-Malaysia Confrontation when in 1965, Indonesia launched a war for control of North Borneo (Sabah/Sarawak) during Malaysian independence, particularly in the Battle of Sungei Koemba..

One of the unit's most notable operations was Operation Woyla in March 1981, when a Garuda Indonesia aircraft was hijacked by five members of Komando Jihad. After a four-day standoff in Thailand, a Kopassandha team led by Lt. Col. Sintong Panjaitan stormed the plane and freed the hostages in about three minutes. The pilot Herman Rante and Kopassus officer Lt. Ahmad Kirang were killed in the rescue.

Another notable operation was Mapenduma hostage crisis in January 1996, when 26 members of the Lorentz 95 Expedition were taken hostage by OPM. As commandant general of Kopassus, Prabowo Subianto led the mission. Most hostages were freed, although three died during the rescue.

In later decades, Kopassus continued to participate in military and security operations. In 2017, the unit deployed personnel to protect the Indonesian embassy in Kabul, Afghanistan.

Kopassus marked its golden jubilee in 2002, commemorating fifty years since the establishment of its earliest predecessor.

== Organization ==
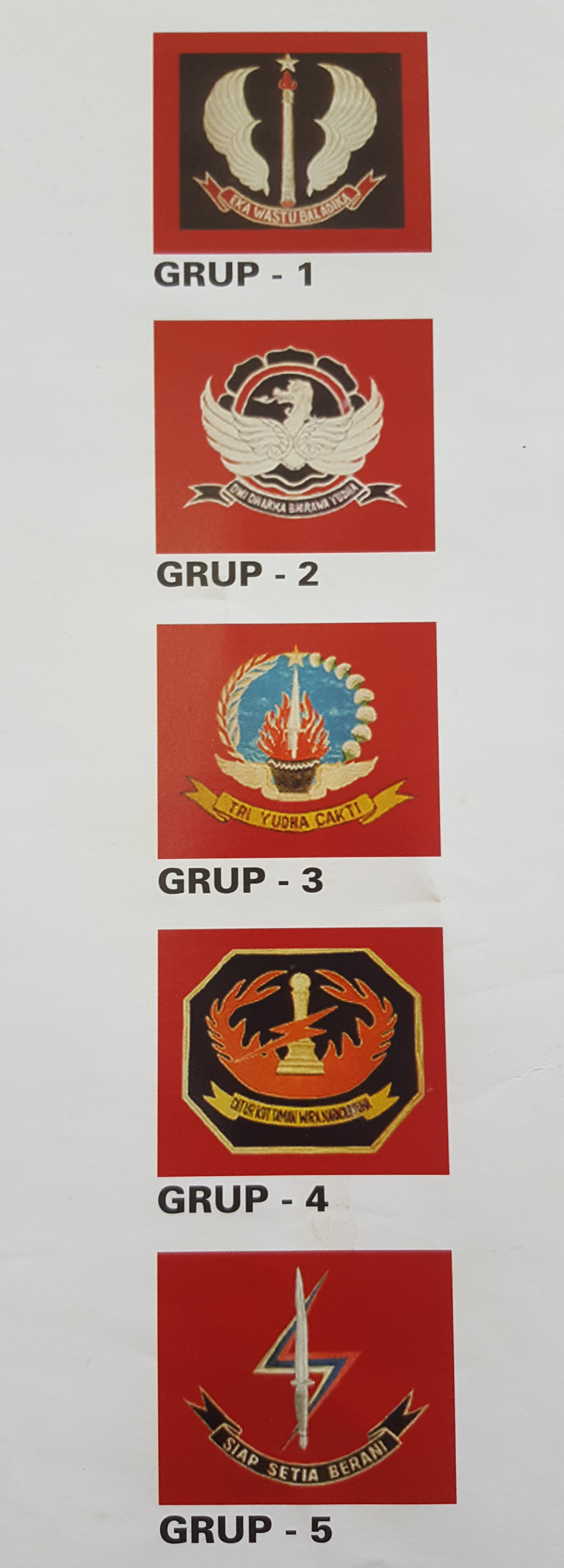
Kopassus' Groups

Kopassus organizational structure is different from the infantry units of the wider Army in general, inclusive of the Kostrad. Although Kopassus members generally are selected from the general Army Infantry, Kopassus maintains a different organizational structure from the rest.

Kopassus units intentionally do not use the nomenclature of standard infantry units. This is apparent in their units called Groups. With this unit, Kopassus can deploy a brigade plus size (about 5,000 personnel), or fewer.

Until 2025, five brigade level groups under Kopassus existed which are:

- Special Forces Training and Education Center (Pusdikpassus) – located in Batujajar, West Java.
- Group 1 Para Commandos. Headquarters at Kartasura, Central Java.
- Group 2 Para Commandos. Headquarters at Serang, Banten, to be relocated to Surakarta, Central Java.
- Group 4 Para Commandos/Sandi Yudha (Clandestine). Headquarters originally at Cijantung, Jakarta, HQ and part of the brigade being relocated to Penajam, East Kalimantan.
- SAT-81 Gultor Counter-terrorism Group. Headquarters at Cijantung, Jakarta.

3 more para commando Groups were activated in 2025, and current Group 4 is already in the process of removing its intelligence role with the ongoing raising of the Sandi Yudha Combat Intelligence Unit (71st Combat Intel Unit), making a total of 8 brigades and two regiments under its order of battle. The new groups are:

- Group 3 Para Commandos, HQ in Dumai, Riau
- Group 5 Para Commandos, HQ in Kendari, Southeast Sulawesi
- Group 6 Para Commandos, HQ in Timika, Central Papua

Except for Pusdikpassus, which serves as the training and education component of Kopassus, other Groups have combat oriented operational functions. Each Group (except Pusdikpassus) is organized into an HQ and a set number of special operations battalions.

=== Group 1 Para Commandos ===
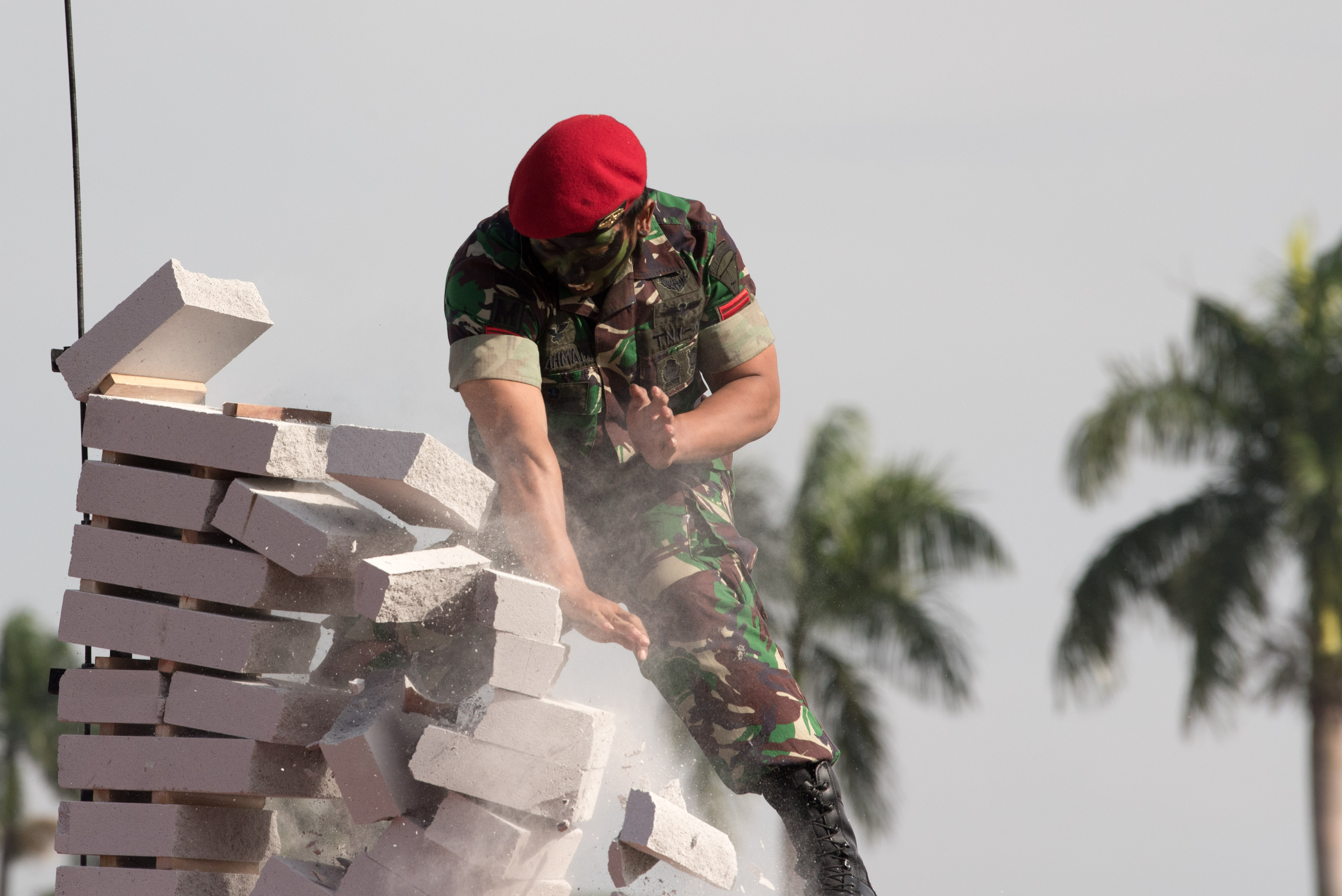
Kopassus commando

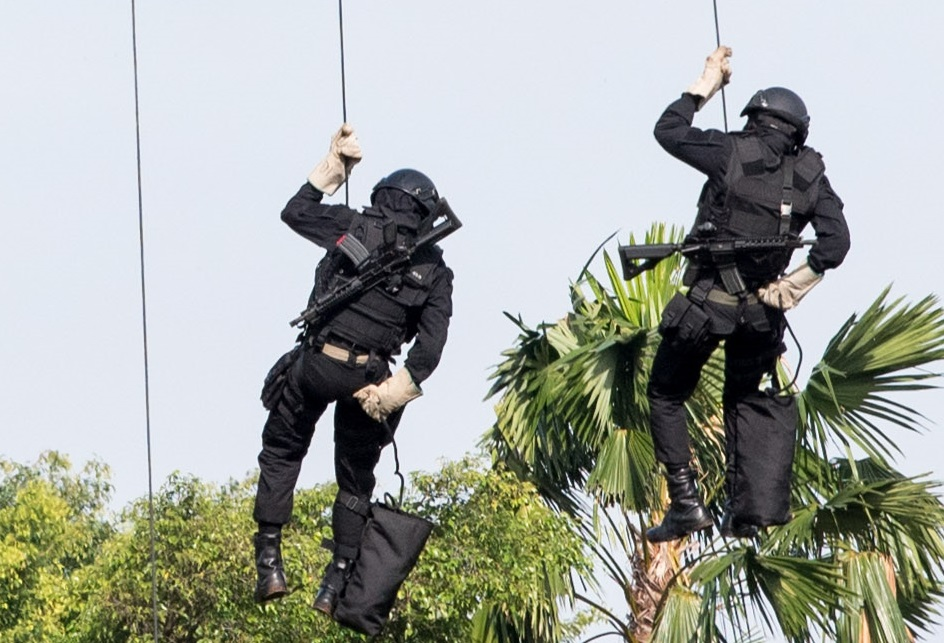
Kopassus commandos in fast roping demonstration

Group 1 Para Commandos (Grup 1 Para Komando) is a unit of Brigade level which is part of the Army Special Forces Command and was established on 23 March 1963. The group was first commanded by the Major L.B. Moerdani. The unit's motto known as Dhuaja is Eka Wastu Baladhika, then created by Corporal Suyanto. The unit's internal organization consists of the group headquarters and six line battalions which are the following:

1. 11th Battalion / "Atulo Sena Bhaladhika"
2. 12th Battalion / "Asabha Sena Baladhika"
3. 13th Battalion / "Thikkaviro Sena Bhaladhika"
4. 14th Battalion / "Bhadrika Sena Bhaladhika"
5. 15th Battalion / Brahmastra Sena Baladika
6. 16th Battalion / "Sahasa Sena Baladika"

Each battalion consists of 3 companies. Each company is broken into 3 platoons, each of which consisted of 39 people. And each platoon consists of 3 small units called a squad of 10 men. The 1st Group, with its current 6 battalions, was for many years the largest brigade of the Kopassus.

=== Group 2 Para Commandos ===
Group 2 Para Commando (Grup 2 Para Komando) is a unit of Brigade level, which is part of the Army Special Forces Command and was established in 1962. The group was first commanded by Major Soegiarto. The unit's motto is Dwi Dharma Bhirawa Yudha. The unit's internal organization are as follows:

1. Group HQ
2. 21st Battalion / "Buhpala Yudha"
3. 22nd Battalion / "Manggala Yudha"
4. 23rd Battalion / "Dhanuja Yudha" – originally located in Parung, Bogor
5. 24th Battalion / "Chala Yudha"
6. 25th Battalion / "Mahabala Yudha"
7. 26th Battalion / "Sahasa Yudha"

Like "Group 1", "Group 2" has the main tasks and responsibilities for missions such as Airborne assault, Jungle warfare, Unconventional Warfare, Counter-insurgency, Special Reconnaissance, and Direct Action in support of the main goals assigned to Kopassus and the wider Army. It and Group 1 are also the oldest brigades of this storied formation. Until the 2025 reorganization, Group 2 was organized into 3 battalions instead of the current 6.

=== Special Forces Training and Education Center ===
The Special Forces Training and Education Center (Pusat Pendidikan dan Latihan Pasukan Khusus) abbreviated "Pusdiklatpassus" is the training and education center for recruits and personnel associated with and qualifying to become full-fledged Commandos in the Army Special Forces Command (Kopassus). As an educational institution, "Pusdiklatpassus" is divided based on its training functions. It was established in 1962 to formalize the training regimen of this storied formation from its inception and to give a professional look towards the training and education studies of future operators and commandos. Its current structure as an educational and training formation is organized into six schools:

- Parachute School
- Commando School
- Sandhi Yudha (Combat Intelligence) School
- School of Specialized Warfare Operations
- Specialization Training School
- Raider Infantry School

The SFTEC provides other specialist courses, which are also open to serving members of the Army outside of the Kopassus such as: Hunting Company, SCUBA diving, Rock-climbing, demolition, Path-Finder and Sniper.

==== Commando Training ====
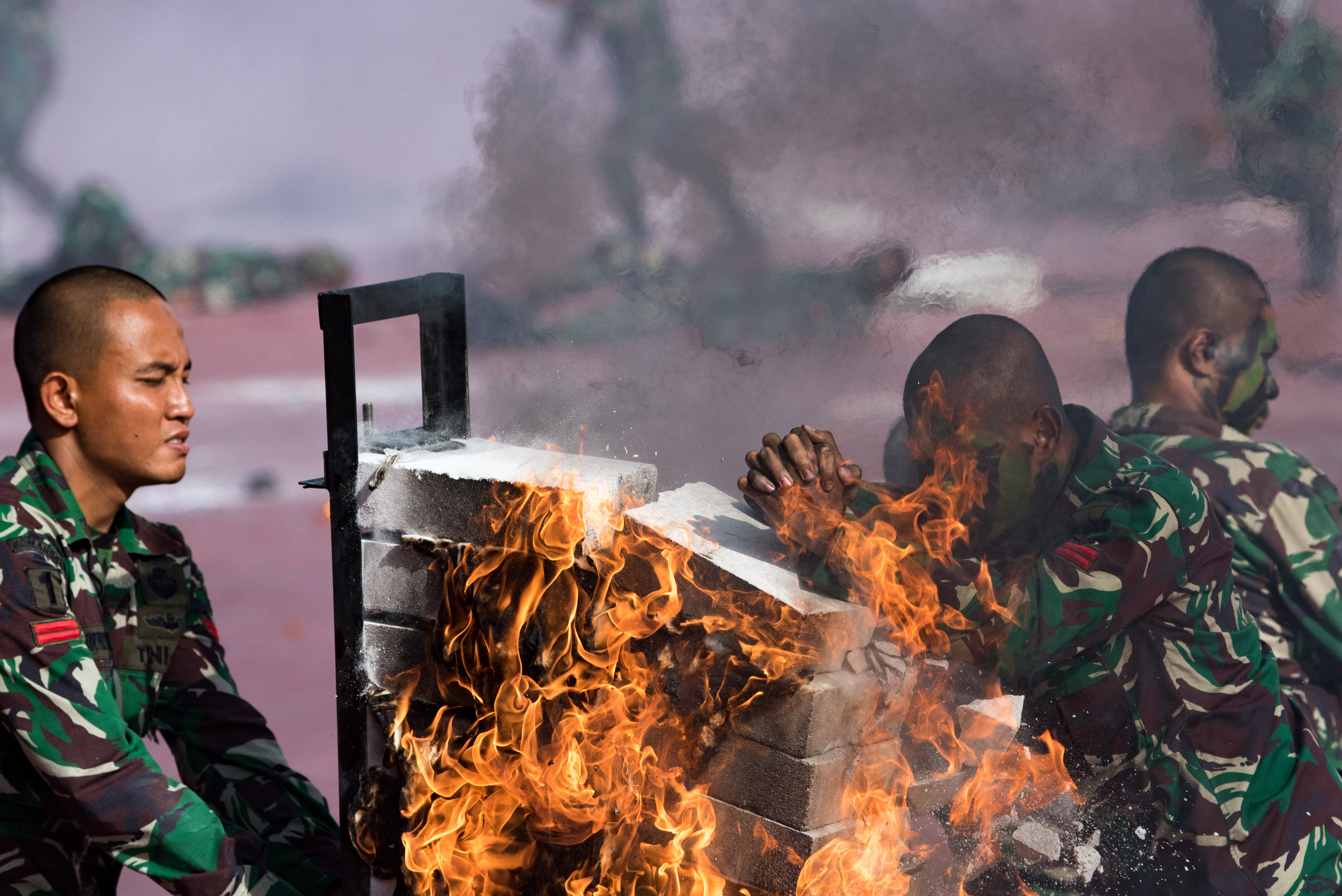
Kopassus commandos are trained in multiple martial arts and self defense knowledge. Shown here are Kopassus commandos demonstrating Merpati Putih

The Kopassus Commando education and training course lasts for approximately seven months (28 weeks) which is divided into three stages. The first phase of the implementation of the education is conducted on the base for 18 weeks, the second stage all participants will be released in the forest and the mountains twice each for 6 weeks, and the next stage of the third stage ends with a 4-week sea-swamp stage. The 97th batch of the Commando training course had first initial participants as many as 251 personnel, 214 of which successfully passed through said course and inaugurated as a special forces commando. Phases are as shown below:

- Phase I (Base training)

10 Weeks with individual ability points in Batujajar. Establish attitudes & personality, fill in technical skills, Command Operation tactics, Individual & basic capabilities of urban battle, Support knowledge, Field managerial, and individual ability test.

- Phase II (Forest and Mountain)

6 Weeks with Counter Insurgency emphasis, Jungle warfare and Raid warfare in Situ Lembang. Stabilization of forest observations, individual abilities in the forest / Basic battle techniques, forest capabilities in group relations, forest HTF, and durability of long march application (LRRP).

- Phase III (Swamp and Sea)

4 Weeks with heavy Commando operation tactics, sea battle tactics in Cilacap and Nusakambangan. Conservation observation of Sea-swamp, patrol ability, swamp terrain knowledge and Resistance to Interrogation test.

Since its formation in 1967, the SFTEC has graduated more than a hundred batches of commando trainees. In the year 2016 alone, that year's batch had 153 commando students, which consisted of 41 Officers, 101 NCOs, and 11 Enlisted personnel, all whom had finished the course. The command officers who successfully complete the 7-month Command Course well are entitled to wear the qualified commando brevet issued to their clothing/uniform.

Aside from Kopassus commandos, the Pusdiklatpassus also trains SF-ready combat personnel of the Army Raider Infantry battalions within the structure of the territorial region commands or KODAMs Army-wide and within Kostrad component units.

=== 71st Regiment Para Commando/Combat Intelligence ===
The Satuan 71/Unit 71 Sandhi Yudha (ex-Group 4 Combat Intel) is a Kopassus unit that has the specification of "Clandestine operation" 'secret warfare', including combat intelligence gathering, counter-intel and counter-insurgency. 71 Regiment was raised on 24 July 1967, with its barracks co-located with the Kopassus Headquarters, in Cijantung, East Jakarta. Prospective personnel in this Group are strictly selected internally ranging from prospective soldiers who are still educated to personnel who have active duty in unity but have skills in intelligence operations that will then be trained again. The motto of this unit is Chatur Kottaman Wira Naraca Byuha. This regiment is organized as follows:

1. Regimental HQ
2. 1st-71 Battalion/Eka Sandhi Yudha Utama
3. 2nd-71 Battalion/Apta Sandhi Prayudha Utama
4. 3rd-71 Battalion/Wira Sandhi Yudha Sakti

==== Conducted Training ====
The basic training is the same as other Kopassus operators (2.5 months), Command School (7 months) plus other courses such as Jungle Warfare, Close Combat, Special combat school and mountain climbing, but after that the candidates of combat-intelligence is educated more specifically for the education of "Sandhi Yudha" in the "Pusdiklatassus" located in Batujajar whose education materials are tailored towards intelligence operations and supporting knowledge for intelligence functions in the field of operations such as disguise, navigation, martial arts, self-defense, Special tools of intelligence and others. Even some selected personnel from this Group are sent abroad to schools of Military Intelligence Education such as those based in the United States, Germany, Britain and even Israel. Among all types of soldiers in "Kopassus", the most specific form of education and training is for those assigned to the 71st Sandhi Yudha combat intelligence unit.

=== SAT-81 Gultor Counter-terrorism regiment ===
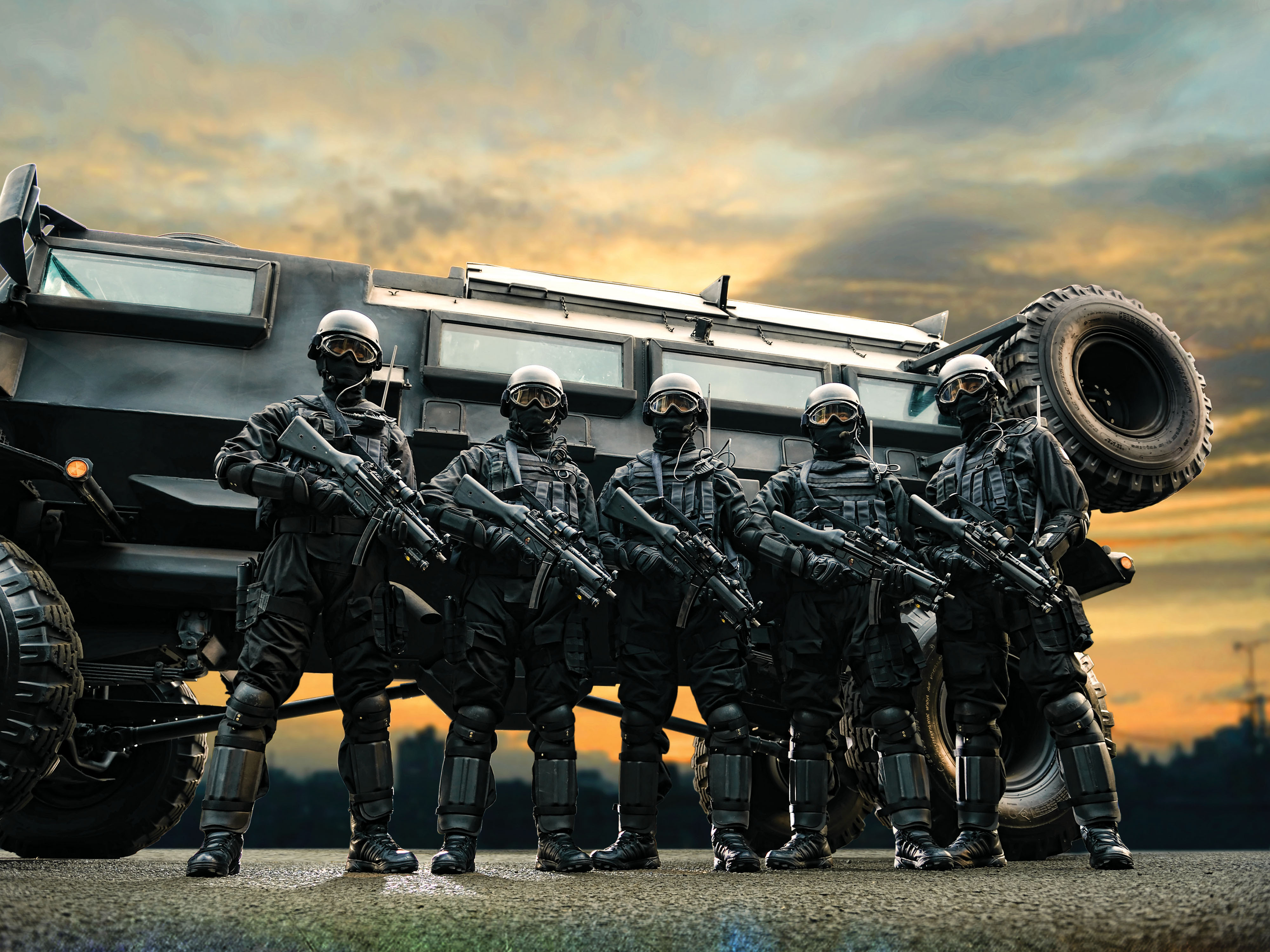
Sat-81 Kopassus counter terrorism group

81st Regiment/ Counter Terror or abbreviated as Sat-81 / Gultor is a unit under the Kopassus which is equivalent to a group level formation and is composed of the best chosen personnel within the whole of the Indonesian Army special forces. The strength of this unit is not publicly publicized on the number of personnel or types of weapons. The Sat 81 Gultor is incorporated in the BNPT Crisis Control Center ("Pusdalsis") which consists of a combination of special units, such as the Denjaka from the Indonesian Navy, the Bravo Detachment 90 of the Indonesian Air Force, and the Gegana Regiment of the Brimob Corps, Indonesian National Police. "Pusdalsis" is organized of a combination of elite units within the Indonesian National Armed Forces and National Police which is assigned as a counter-terrorist formation to be sent when the activities of terrorism may be conducted such as aircraft hijacking. The regiment is organized into a group HQ and three Special Forces Battalions:

1. 811th Special Action Battalion / Wega Yogya Gabhira
2. 812th Support Battalion / Wira Drdha Ghabira
3. 813th Combat and Service Support Detachment

Recruitment is done by choosing from members which at least have 2 years of active service in the groups of the Kopassus organization, and must complete 6 months of Counter Terrorism Selection and Reinforcement Training before being assigned.

=== Command structure ===
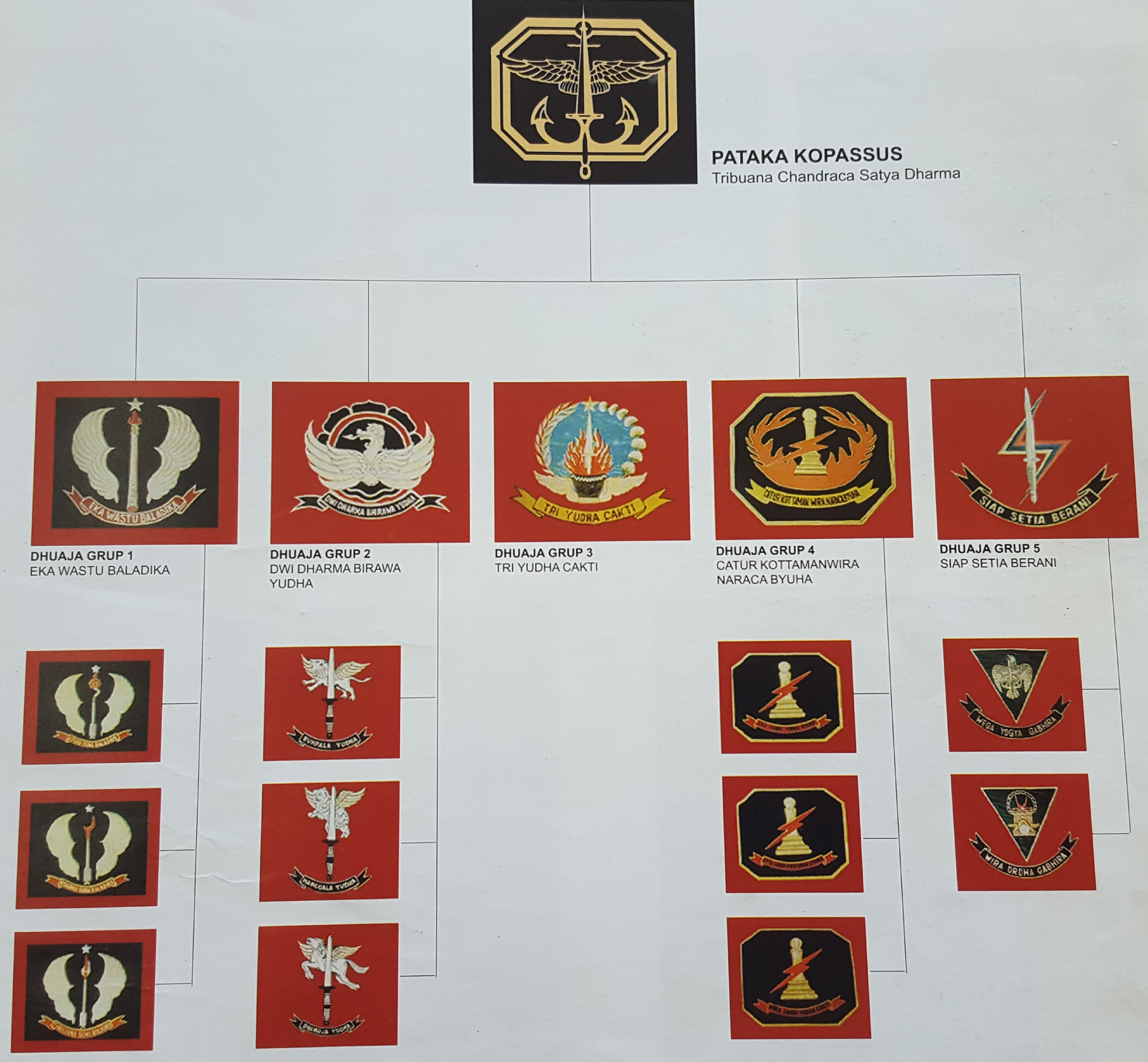
Kopassus organization during the new order

== Training ==
The unit actively conduct training and joint operation with United States Army Special Forces, SFOD-D, Special Air Service Regiment, CIA, MOSSAD, GSG9.

Kopassus participates in bilateral training exercises with international partners. After resuming military ties in 2003, Australia's special operations unit, the Special Air Service Regiment, conducts an annual counter terrorism exercise, with Australia and Indonesia taking turns to host the event.

In July 2011, Kopassus and Chinese special forces held a joint counter terrorism exercise called Exercise Sharp Knife, held in Bandung, Java. In July 2012, Exercise Sharp Knife II was held in Jinan, China.

In 2015, Kopassus and South Korea 707th Special Mission Battalion held a joint counter terrorism exercise in South Korea.

On 19 February 2018, Kopassus and 9 Para SF held a joint exercise called Garuda Sakti in Cipatat, Bandung.

On 7 February 2019, Kopassus and Special Service Group held a joint counter terrorism exercise called Elang Strike in Pabbi, Pakistan.

In May 2019, former Secretary of Defense Ryamizard Ryacudu and United States Acting Secretary of Defense Patrick M. Shanahan announced a joint combined exercise training in 2020. The exercise to be held in Indonesia would focus on combat medic training.

In February 2020, the Asia Times reported that Kopassus recently took part in a full–on combat training exercise with the United States 1st Special Forces Command (Airborne) at Fort Bragg, United States, and that it was the first combat training exercise with the US since a 15-year military embargo was lifted in 2005.

In November 2021, the 1st Scout Ranger Regiment have conducted joint training with Kopassus operators.

== Uniform and Attributes ==
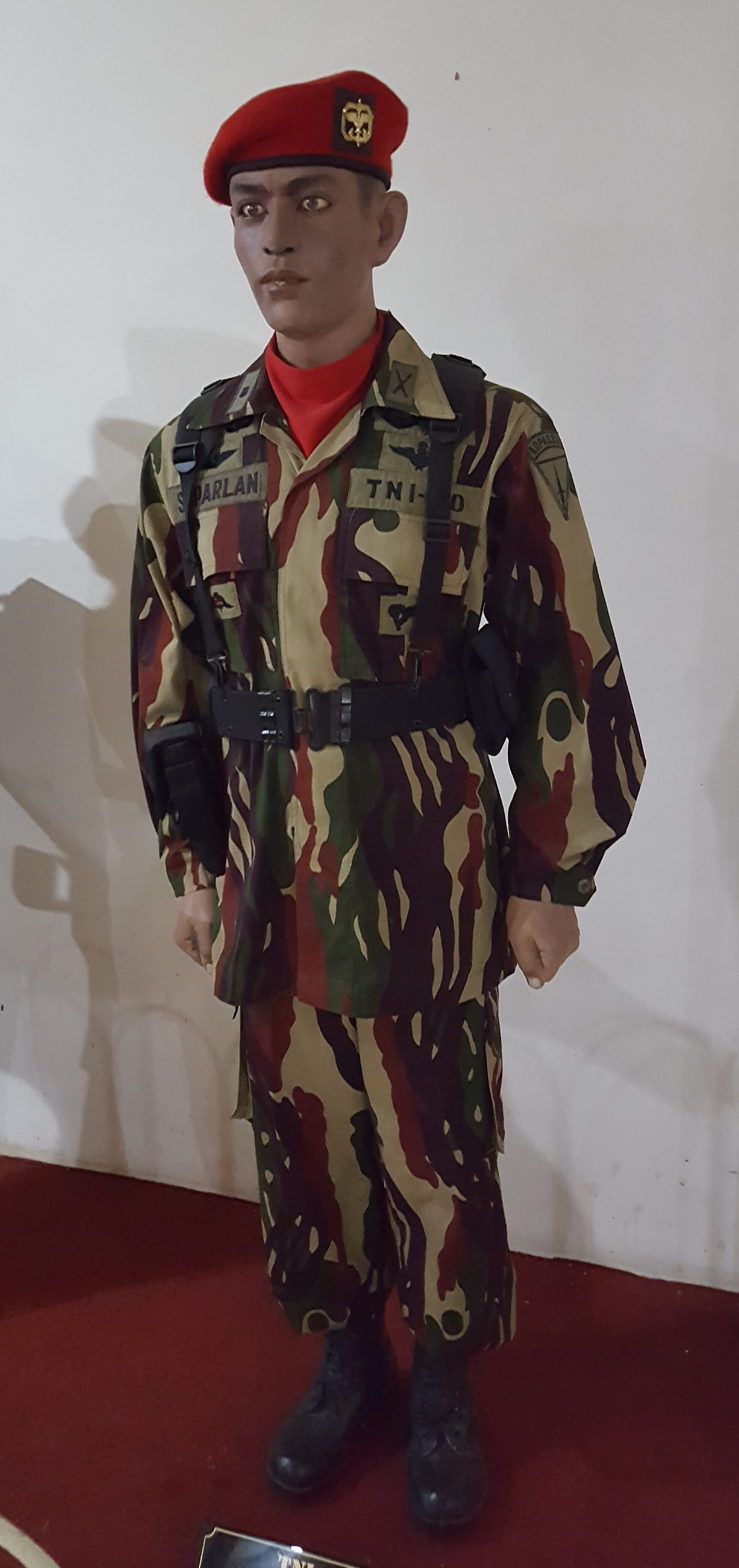
Uniform of Kopassus with the Ceremonial "Streaming Blood" Camouflage Pattern (Loreng Darah Mengalir)

=== Brief History of Kopassus Attributes ===
The Kopassus (then RPKAD) red beret was first used in 1954–1968 and was designed by Lieutenant Dodo Sukamto. It was first used during a ceremony on 5 October 1954. This emblem consists of a bayonet, anchors representing abilities in the sea and wings as high mobility. The beret emblem used in 1968 until now with slight changes from the initial design, the bayonet is more slender than the Commando knife and the wingspan is more wing coat like the Wing of the Army designs. The iconic Kopassus Camouflage pattern called Loreng Darah Mengalir (Flowing Blood pattern), introduced in 1964 pattern was originally intended to be a copy of the WW2 era British Denison brushstroke camouflage for issue to the RPKAD. However, an error at the original manufacturing plant resulted in the vertical, vine-like stripes that characterize this unique pattern. The original version illustrated, with some variation in color and type of fabric, saw service between 1964 and 1986 (at which time the entire Armed Forces were outfitted in a copy of British DPM). The second pattern shown was revived for issue to Kopassus in 1995 but in a slightly varied design, worn for ceremonial & training purposes only. For other purpose the regular TNI pattern (DPM, Loreng SAMAR or Spectrum Random Eye Adaptation Engineering, Black MultiCam and today the Loreng Kostrad-based digital camouflage) was used instead.

=== Commando Brevet ===
The Commando qualification brevet used since 1966 until now was designed by Major Djajadiningrat. This brevet is used by all graduates of Commando training and Education from Batujajar. Colonel Sarwo Edhie Wibowo used the new Commando Brevet qualification to show the public of the Corps' new appearance on 4 January 1966 during an Army-organized open house event at the grounds of the Gelora Bung Karno Sports Complex, which, among others, featured a mass jump of Kopassus parachute commandos and operators in front of watching crowds.

=== Paratrooper Badges ===
==== Jump Master Wings ====
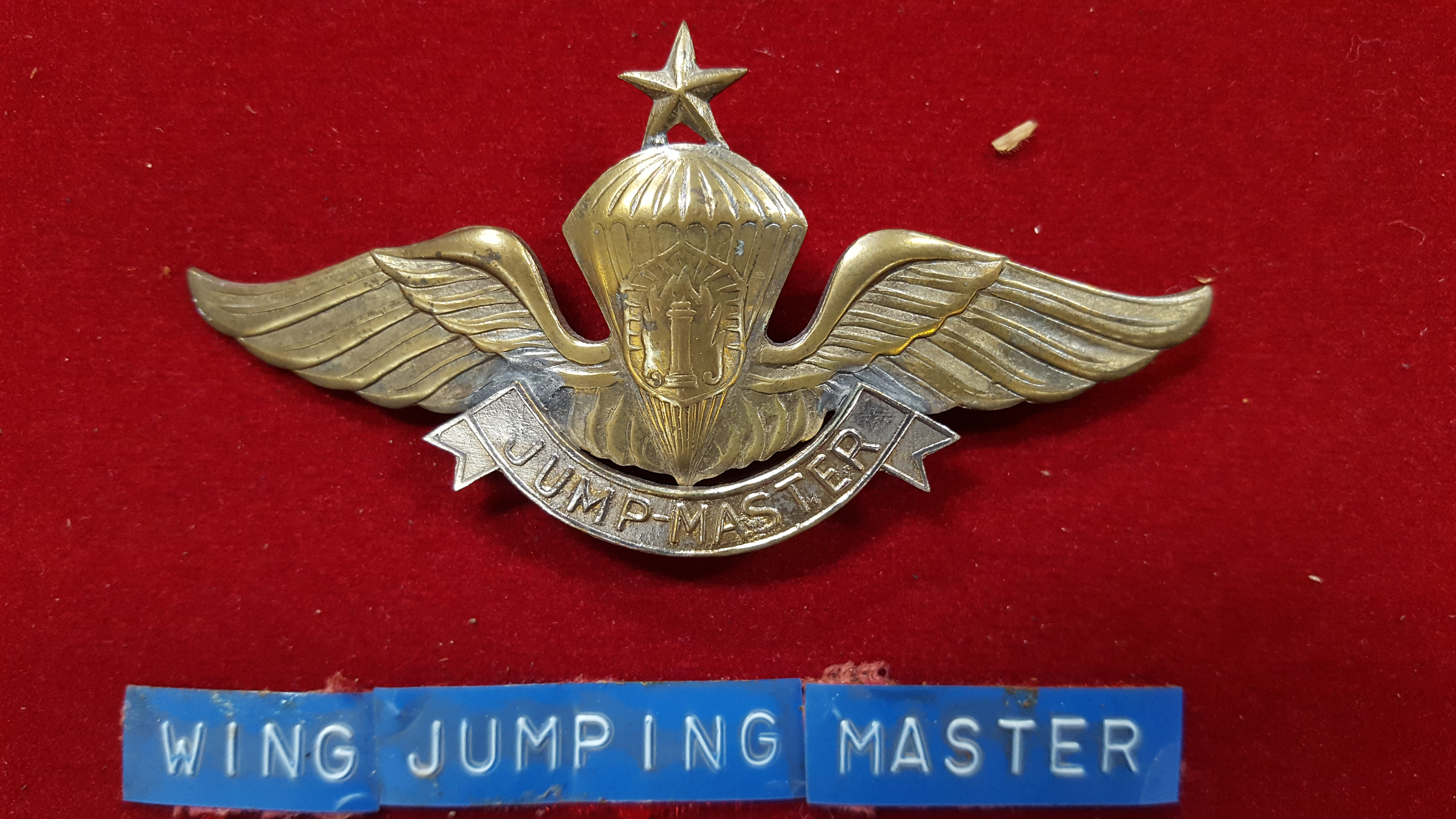
Jump Master Wing badge

Jump Master Wings are issued to commandos of the Kopassus who have graduated from the advanced paratrooper jump master courses conducted by the Commando training and educational center.

==== Free Fall Wing ====
The Kopassus (RPKAD) military freefall wing insignia, designed by HH.Djajadiningrat and first issued in 1962 depicts a free fall paratrooper hanging under a circle consisting of small parachutes. The iconic wing was first worn by the first free fall instructors Mladen Milicetic, Stoyan Jovic and Dobel Stanej, all from the Yugoslav Ground Forces, in Bandung during the first free fall graduation ceremony of Kopassus (RPKAD) held there on 26 October 1962.

== Controversies ==
=== Accusations of human rights violations ===
Kopassus has been accused by NGOs, Western politicians, and researchers of human rights violations. Amnesty International and Indonesian human rights groups including the official National Commission on Human Rights (Komnas HAM) have cited abuses by members of Kopassus.

Kopassus has also been associated with illegal economic activities, like involvement in the trade of Agarwood and illegal gold mining in West Papua and other areas, and the trade in drugs.

In 1975, five Australian journalists, known as the Balibo Five, were killed by members of Kopassus in the town of Balibo during the Indonesian invasion of East Timor. The Indonesian military has always maintained that the men were killed in a cross-fire during the battle for the town.

in December 1975, Australian freelance journalist Roger East was captured and killed by members of the Indonesian armed forces, including units associated with Kopassus. East had travelled to Portuguese Timor to investigate the fate of the Balibo Five and continued reporting as Indonesian forces advanced. On 8 December 1975, East was detained in Dili and brought to the waterfront, where eyewitnesses reported that he and a number of others were executed by firing squad; his body fell into the sea and was never recovered. Various accounts describe East being shot despite identifying himself as a journalist, leading to allegations that his killing was a summary execution rather than combat-related, No Indonesian personnel have been prosecuted for East’s death, and calls for formal inquiries have persisted in Australia and among human rights advocates.

Arnold Ap was a West Papuan cultural leader, anthropologist and musician. Arnold was the leader of the group Mambesak, and Curator of the Cenderawasih University Museum. In November 1983, he was arrested by Kopassus and imprisoned and tortured for suspected sympathies with the Free Papua Movement, although no charges were laid. In April 1984, he was killed by a gunshot to his back. Official accounts claim he was trying to escape. Many supporters believe Ap was executed by Kopassus. Another musician, Eddie Mofu, was also killed.

Between 1997 and 1998, Kopassus members from Tim Mawar (Rose Team) were responsible for pro-democracy activists kidnappings of at least 22 people mainly in Jakarta. Nine activists were released and 13 remain missing. In 1999, 11 members of Tim Mawar were found guilty by a military court. However, they appealed the verdict to the Supreme Court, which was not made public and only revealed in 2007, and were never jailed and all but one remained in the military. In September 2020, Defence Minister Prabowo Subianto appointed two of the Team Mawar officers, two serving Brigadier generals, to senior positions in the Ministry of Defense following approval by President Joko Widodo. Amnesty International criticised the appointments as the President and the DPR had promised to investigate missing activist cases and instead placed suspects in positions of power. and shortly after Prabowo was inaugurated as president two more former members of the Team Mawar became heads of the National Cyber and Crypto Agency and the Main Secretariat of the State Intelligence Agency

The United Nations Report of the International Commission of Inquiry on East Timor found there was evidence that Kopassus in 1999 engaged militias to conduct intimidation and terror tasks to influence the outcome of the independence referendum.

In 2001, four Kopassus members were convicted of the strangulation of Theys Eluay, the former chairman of the Papua Presidium Council. They were part of a group which had killed Theys after ambushing him and his driver. The group's leader, Lt-Col Hatono, and another soldier received prison sentences of three and a half years while two others received three years. A further two officers had their charges dismissed. The men were all Kopassus members from Group V (Jakarta) and were not based in Jayapura or West Papua. They faced a court-martial, which found them not guilty on the more serious charges of premeditated murder, because the Kopassus are legally exempt from the jurisdiction of civil law. Indonesian Army Chief, General Ryamizard Ryacudu (2002–05), accepted the men had to be prosecuted "because Indonesia is a State based on law" but he affirmed their defence's view that they were heroes who had killed a rebel leader.

In 2002, Kopassus is accused of killing three teachers (two of whom were American and one Indonesian) and wounding 12 others in an ambush in August near the Freeport mine. For this, the US Congress extended its existing ban on contact with the Indonesian military. There is also suspicion that the attack was aimed at blackmailing mine owners into paying protection money. From 2000 to 2002, Freeport-McMoRan paid the TNI $10.7 million in protection money, but the company shut down the payments shortly before the ambush.

In July 2002, Private Leonard Manning, was a New Zealand Army soldier serving with the United Nations Transitional Administration in East Timor (UNTAET) when he was killed during a patrol near Suai in East Timor. His patrol came under attack on 24 July 2000 by an armed group of pro-Indonesian militia near Foho Debalulik, close to the border with West Timor, and Manning was shot and killed in the engagement. While the official account describes Manning death as the result of an ambush by militia elements, some contemporary reports alleged involvement of members of Kopassus or Indonesia-linked forces rather than unaffiliated civilian militia. After the incident, UN investigators reportedly found military-style equipment and uniforms bearing Kopassus insignia near the scene, and the condition of Manning body, including mutilation after death was cited by some observers as suggestive of involvement by trained combatants rather than irregular militias. However, the United Nations did not officially conclude Kopassus involvement, and Indonesian authorities prosecuted one militia member, Yacobus Bere, for the Manning murder, resulting in a six-year sentence in Indonesian court. The incident contributed to ongoing controversy over Indonesian military and special forces conduct in and around East Timor during and after the 1999 independence referendum period, with critics arguing that Indonesian security forces and affiliated militias operated with insufficient oversight and accountability.

In 2003, Laskar Jihad fighters have been trained by Kopassus in a training camp near Bogor in West Java. Laskar Jihad members even received military escorts while travelling from West Java to Surabaya. The behaviour of the military in Maluku was similarly biased. Although at first a newly created military unit, the Joint Battalion, took action against Laskar Jihad in Maluku, it was replaced in mid-2001 by Kopassus, which was more sympathetic towards the militia.

in November 2003, Yustinus Murib was a West Papuan rebel who was the leader of the Free Papua Movement, Shortly before being killed Murib sent letters to a few different world leaders and the United Nations, calling for an independent nation to be a mediator between Megawati Sukarnoputri and the Papuan independence movement. He and other leaders of the separatist movement had called for peace talks with the central government, but Kopassus troops killed him and nine of his men and displayed his corpse as a trophy.

Some international partners have severed military ties with Kopassus in response to allegations of human rights abuses. For example, Australia ceased training with Kopassus in September 1999 in relation to Kopassus' role in violence in East Timor. In early 2006, Australia resumed training exercises with Unit 81 focused on "skills required to conduct counter-hijack and hostage recovery operations" having earlier re-newed links in 2003 with the last similar exercise held in 1997. The United States re-newed links with Kopassus in 2010 after President Susilo Bambang Yudhoyono advised the Obama administration it was the "litmus test of the bilateral relationship" after intense lobbying over four years to lift the 1999 ban. Secretary of Defense Robert Gates said it would be a limited program of cooperation "within the limits of U.S. law" that could be expanded dependent upon continued implementation of human-rights reform including suspending members of the military accused of human-rights abuses, discharging members convicted of abuses and prosecuting members who have violated human-rights. In response, thirteen US Congress members wrote to the Secretary of State and the Defense Secretary that they had serious concerns.

=== Criminal conducts ===
In 1996 a member of Kopassus known as Sanurip suffering from depression went on a rampage and killed 16 (11 military and 5 civilians) and injured 11 others. He was later sentenced to death.

In March 2013, twelve Kopassus members wearing ski masks and armed with AK-47 rifles raided the Cebongan Prison near Yogyakarta which housed four prisoners charged with murdering their superior officer three days earlier in a nightclub brawl. The members threatened and beaten 12 prisons guards and a member fatally shot the four prisoners. The shooter was found guilty of homicide in a military court and sentenced to eleven years and two other members who supplied the weapons and stood next to him as he shot received six and eight years sentences. Three of the twelve members tried and sentenced in the military court were dishonorably discharged.

In September 2015, the Army Chief of Staff General Mulyono at a ceremony at the Kopassus headquarters, stated that "There are still soldiers from the Indonesian Army who taint the name of their force and the Army with their arrogant and selfish attitudes … by engaging in misdeeds or even acting against the law". Kopassus members had months earlier been involved in two incidents:

- June 2015: Kopassus members were involved in a brawl with Indonesian Air Force members at a karaoke parlour in Sukoharjo, resulting in the death of an Air Force member. Five Kopassus members were tried for violence resulting in death in November 2015.
- July 2015: A Kopassus member was arrested for his suspected involvement in the kidnapping of a Malaysian businessman.
- August 2025: a kidnapping and murder of a bank branch manager in Jakarta carried out by 17 people, 3 of whom were members of Kopassus. The main motive for the kidnapping was related to a plan to transfer money from a dormant account that required access and approval from a bank branch manager. According to the authorities The motive was because the person concerned received a sum of money. 15 people were tried including all Kopassus members involved, on 18 December 2025.

== Equipment ==
=== Small arms ===
- Accuracy International AW
- AK-47
- Benelli M3T
- Beretta 92SB / Beretta 92F
- Browning Hi-Power
- Carl Gustaf 8.4cm recoilless rifle
- Colt 1911
- Colt M16A2
- Colt M4
- FN Herstal Five-Seven
- FN Herstal MAG
- FN Herstal Minimi
- FN Herstal P90
- Franchi SPAS-12
- Glock 19
- Heckler & Koch G3
- Heckler & Koch G36
- Heckler & Koch HK53
- Heckler & Koch Mk23
- Heckler & Koch MP5
- Heckler & Koch HK 416
- Pindad SS1
- Pindad SS2
- Pindad SS2-V5C
- QBZ-95
- Remington 700
- SIG Sauer P226/P228
- SIG Sauer SG 552
- SIG Sauer SG 550 Sniper
- Steyr AUG
- Uzi
- Škorpion vz. 61
- Walther PPK
- Kriss S.V
- Custom made Fairbairn–Sykes fighting knife
- Ultimax 100

=== Fighting vehicles ===
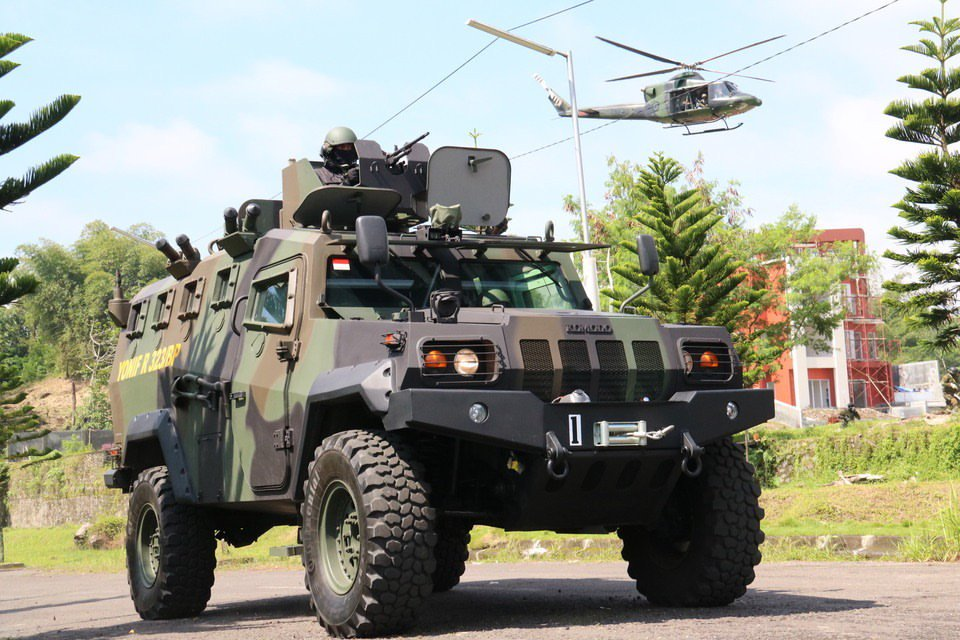
Pindad Komodo

- Casspir MK3
- Pindad Komodo
- Bushmaster
- Land Rover Defender
- Jankel Al-Thalab
- P6 ATAV
- Mamba APC
- First Win
- OKA 4wd
- Light Strike Vehicle (Singapore)
- Bandvagn 206
- SSE P1 PAKCI

== List of Commanders ==
The Commander of Kopassus is a position that is filled by a three star general officer.

== Notable members ==
Throughout its history, many Kopassus members are notable (remarkable, significant, distinguish, or unusual enough to deserve attention or to be remembered) during their military career and/or become Indonesian government officials who not only take care of government affairs, but also help create many important decisions in Indonesia.

- Abdullah Mahmud Hendropriyono – a general, politician, and the first Head of State Intelligence Agency (2001–2004).
- Agum Gumelar – Politician, Head of Football Association of Indonesia (1999 – 2003, and 2011), Minister of Defense (2001), Minister of Transportation (2001–2004).
- Feisal Tanjung – Commander of the Indonesian National Armed Forces (1993–1998), Coordinating Minister for Political, Legal, and Security Affairs (1998–1999).
- Hinsa Siburian – served as Chief of National Cyber and Crypto Agency (2019–2024).
- I Gusti Putu Danny Nugraha Karya – served as the Head of Papua Regional State Intelligence Agency until his death in combat during a military operation in April 2021.
- LB Moerdani – Commander of the Indonesian National Armed Forces (1983–1988), Minister of Defense (1988–1993).
- Luhut Binsar Pandjaitan – Founder and First Commander of Detachment 81 (now Sat-81/Gultor); Politician, Indonesian Ambassador to Singapore (1999–2000), Minister of Industry and Trade (2000–2001), Presidential Chief of Staff (2014–2015), Coordinating Minister of Political and Security Affairs (2015–2016), Acting Minister of Energy and Mineral Resources (2016), Coordinating Minister of Maritime and Investment Affairs (2016–2024), Chairman of the National Economic Council (2024–present).
- Mochammad Idjon Djanbi – first recruit and first commander.
- Prabowo Subianto – Politician, Minister of Defense (2019–2024), The eighth President of Indonesia (2024–present).
- Sarwo Edhie Wibowo – fifth Kopassus Commander, Ambassador of Indonesia to South Korea (1974–1978), and national hero.
- Sjafrie Sjamsoeddin – Minister of Defense (2024–present).
- Sugiono – personal secretary to Prabowo Subianto (2008–2018), member of the House of Representatives (2019–2024), 18th Minister of Foreign Affairs (2024–present), Secretary-General of the Gerindra Party (2025–present).
- Sutiyoso – Politician, Governor of Jakarta (1997–2007), Head of the Indonesian State Intelligence Agency (2015–2016).
- Yogie SM – Governor of West Java (1985–1993), Minister of Home Affairs (1993–1998).
- Yunus Yosfiah – 25th Minister of Information.

== In popular culture ==
- Pengkhianatan G30S/PKI, A 1984 Indonesian docudrama written and directed by Arifin C. Noer, produced by G. Dwipayana, and starring Amoroso Katamsi, Umar Kayam, and Syubah Asa. The film was based on an official history of the 30 September Movement (Gerakan 30 September, or G30S) coup in 1965 written by Nugroho Notosusanto and Ismail Saleh, which depicted the coup as being orchestrated by the Communist Party of Indonesia (Partai Komunis Indonesia, or PKI).
- Merah Putih Memanggil, A 2017 Indonesian movie directed by Mirwan Suwarso and starring Maruli Tumpubolon. The film depicted hostage rescue situation.
- Patriot, mini-series in Net TV in 2016 starring Rizky Hanggono about a group commando liberation village.
- Balibo, an Australian film dedicated to Roger East and Balibo Five shows this unit as the ones murdering the Five and executing Roger East.

== See also ==
- Kopaska
- Kopasgat
- Garda Muda Penegak Integrasi, an Indonesian paramilitary group
