= Theys Eluay =

Indonesian murdered politician (1937–2001)

Theys Hiyo Eluay
- Born: Dortheys Hiyo Eluay; 3 November 1937; Sereh, Sentani, Dutch East Indies
- Died: 10 November 2001 (aged 64); Muara Tami, Jayapura, Papua, Indonesia
- Cause of death: Assassinated by the army special forces
- Known for: Local legislature member, chairman of Papua Presidium Council
- Political party: Parkindo; Golkar (1977–1992)

Dortheys Hiyo Eluay (known as Theys Hiyo Eluay; 3 November 1937 – 10 November 2001) was an Indonesian local politician from Irian Jaya (currently Papua) turned West Papuan independence activist. Known as the former leader of Papua Presidium Council, he was known as the community leader in West Papua region. He was murdered by members of the Indonesian Army special forces command.

== Early life and political career ==
Theys was born in Sereh village in Sentani, in what was then Dutch East Indies part of New Guinea. He went to the Jongensvervolgschool (post-primary education) in Yoka, a boarding school, led by the Dutch missionary Izaak Samuel Kijne. After the JVS he followed a course in meteorology and worked then as a meteorological assistant. He also became an "ondoafi", a traditional leader of a village.

In 1962 Indonesia took over New Guinea from the Dutch. Theys helped the Indonesian army and police to find Papuans who were anti-Indonesian. This led to a great number of casualties in the Sentani area. In 1969 Theys was one of those few Papuans selected to take part in the UN-supervised Penentuan Pendapat Rakyat or PEPERA (dubbed Act of Free Choice by its detractors), which unanimously voted for integration with Indonesia. He campaigned in favour for integration with Indonesia.

In 1971 he became a member of the local legislature, Regional People's Representative Council of Irian Jaya Province, from Indonesian Christian Party (Parkindo); in 1977 he moved to Golkar. In 1980 he joined the Papua Customary Deliberative Council (Lembaga Musyawarah Adat Papua) as a representative for the Sentani area, and later for the whole of Papua Province. In 1990 he became its chairman. From 1996 onwards the council became more political, while, with the increased political freedom after the downfall of President Suharto in 1998, the council really began to speak out openly about the political status of Papua and about the right of the Papuans to self-determination.

== Activism ==
In 1999 Theys was elected at the Great Consultation in Sentani (Mubes or Musyawarah Besar) as the chairman of the Papua Presidium Council (Presidium Dewan Papua PDP). In setting up this organisation, he used funds provided by Wahid government, as well as from Indonesian military. In 2000, on the President Abdurrahman Wahid-supported Second Papua Congress in Jayapura, he was confirmed as leader of the PDP. Tom Beanal, the Amungme leader was elected as his deputy. He began calling himself Pimpinan Besar Bangsa Papua (PBBP), the Great Leader of the Papuan People, and he appeared almost daily in the papers. He organized young Papuans in the Satgas Papua (Papua Task Force) and had them trained. The Satgas Papua managed to establish, with success, order at large mass demonstrations and at the Mubes and the Papua Congress. The Satgas were led by his son Boy Eluay. Theys also initiated the Posko Papua (Papua Commanding Post), established at the entrance of many villages to control who would go in or out of the village, to prevent provocators, to create a situation of violent conflict as in neighbouring Ambon. From his home in Sentani the Morning Star flag of independent Papua was being raised. For these projects they have received generous financial support from Yorrys Raweyai, a papuan of Chinese descent from Serui, deputy chairman of the Pemuda Pancasila, a pro-Suharto youth organisation, consisting of gangsters. Although the apparent unchecked growth of Satgas Papua and sometimes funding for its activities was a part of counter-insurgency strategy of Indonesian security forces, in order to infiltrate and compromise and “turn” existing separatist groups, in addition to identify other covert independence networks and personalities.

== Death ==
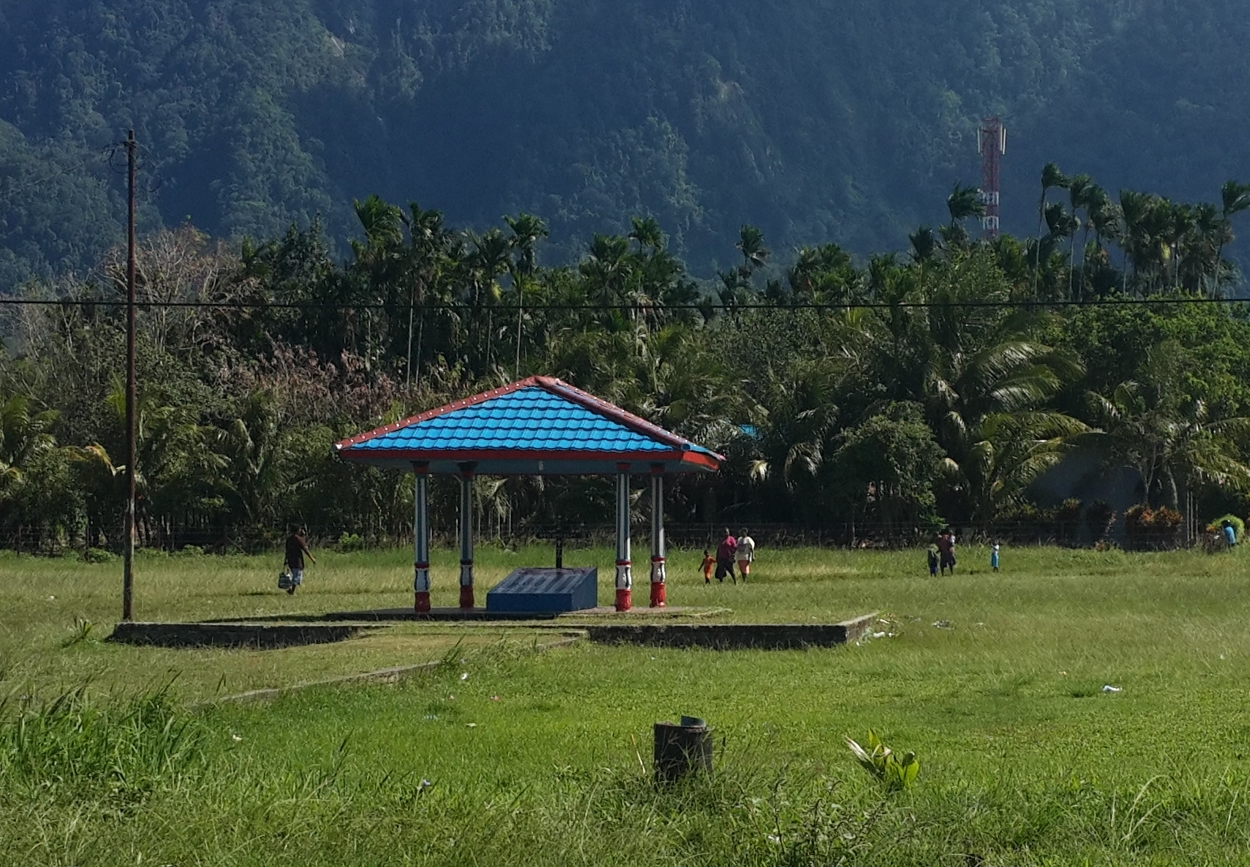
The tomb of Theys Eluay in Jayapura

On 26 September 2001 Theys Eluay approached officially the consultation of leaders (including the army and police chiefs) of Papua Province to ask for the reasons for the killing of Willem Onde, a Papuan community leader, on 14 September in Merauke. Willem Onde was, apparently, killed by the army or by Kopassus. On 10 November 2001 Heroes Day was celebrated at the headquarters of Kopassus. The people who were invited had some link with the integration of Irian into Indonesia in 1963. According to people present at the party, the commander of the Kopassus got his microphone and said loudly goodbye to Theys when he left at around 10 o'clock in the night. "Goodbye to the Great Leader of the Papuans. Have a safe journey home!"

On that night he was killed by Kopassus officers, whom he had given a lift in his car on his way home. A few days after the abduction and murder Kopassus soldiers were seen cleaning the place of the abduction in Skyline very thoroughly. Theys was given a heroes funeral. He was buried without his heart, as the police told the public it had sent it in a box to Jakarta to a forensic laboratory to look for evidence that Theys had died from a stroke. The heart was never returned and no laboratory in Jakarta or Makassar knew anything of this request. It was quite clear that Theys had died because of suffocation. He was buried on a soccer field his family owns in Sentani, close to Sentani International Airport. This was supposed to become a new "Acre of Heroes", who had died in the struggle of Papuan activists, like Arnold Ap and Thomas Wanggai.

Though it was from the beginning clear that only a very well organized group could have killed Theys, it took some time to have the investigation on its way. Elsham, the Jayapura-based human rights organization, published a report, which suggested that the murder was organized at the instigation of elements in the central government, which want to maintain national unity, at all cost. A special national investigation commission was set up by President Megawati to investigate not only the brains behind the murder, but also to look for possibilities of involvement of government departments or sections of the army. In the end four Kopassus soldiers were convicted and sentenced to 3 - 3.5 years in jail. The Commander in Chief of the Indonesian army, General Endriartono Sutarto, however, publicly said that he disagreed with the sentence, as these soldiers should be considered "heroes" as they had killed in order to maintain the national unity of the Republic. Nobody was charged with the murder of Ari, the driver of Theys, who "disappeared". There are, however, five witnesses who have seen Ari enter the Kopassus headquarters in Hamadi, which, by the way, is at the same location as a logging company owned by the Soeharto family. People, and also his parents, fear that Ari was killed by the Kopassus in Hamadi.

A period of increased repression of all forms of protests against Indonesian rule began. Theys was succeeded as chairman of the PDP by Thom Beanal, his deputy. The PDP, however, never regained the authority and worldwide publicity it had had under the short leadership of Theys Eluay. The PDP, nevertheless still devoted in peaceful movement to solve Papua's conflict. This culminated in its support for the creation and passing of Special Autonomy Law for Papuans in 2001.

On 10 November 2018, Yanto Eluay, son of Theys Eluay, along with relatives of Eluay, during the 17-year anniversary of the Theys Eluay killing, declared forgiveness for the perpetrators. He also asked Theys’ killing to not be called a “human rights violation” or used for political reasons, following Boy Eluay's visit to Kopassus 63rd birthday in Cijantung, East Jakarta, in 2015, who praised the changes in the special forces conduct and forgiveness for killing his father.

== Legacy ==
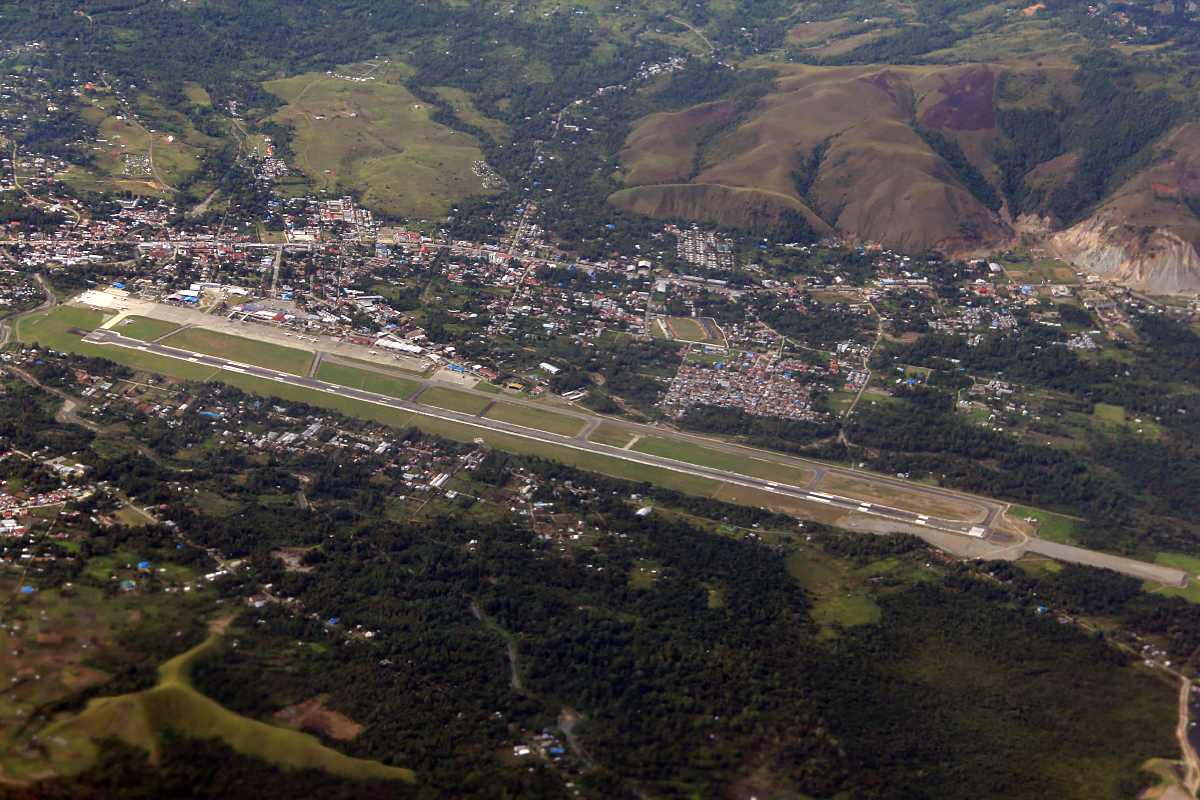
The newly renamed Dortheys Hiyo Eluay International Airport in Sentani.

On 20 October 2020, the Governor of Papua Lukas Enembe, with the approval of the Ministry of Transportation and the Papua Regional People's Representative Council, renamed Sentani International Airport, the largest airport in Papua, into Dortheys Hiyo Eluay International Airport after him. According to his son, Yanto Eluay, this naming was in honour of his efforts of fighting for the rights of the Papuans, and also as one of the participants in the 1969 PEPERA that help to integrate West Irian with Indonesia. The airport was constructed on customary land of the Eluay family that was released to the Dutch by Nero Nihiwe Eluay.
