= Papua Presidium Council =

The Papua Presidium Council (Indonesian: Presidium Dewan Papua, PDP; pronounced [presiˌdiʊm ˌdewan paˈpua]) was a 31-member umbrella group that was established to represent Papuan people fighting for an independent West Papuan state. It is not only representing indigenous Papuans but also migrants from Indonesia. Papuan Presidium Council was established during the second congress from May 29 to June 23, 2000, in Hollandia (now Jayapura). It is commonly referred to as PDP among the Papuans.

The Presidium presides the Papua Council, which is as a re-emerged form of the New Guinea Council, established in 1961, which was approved and gazetted by the Kingdom of the Netherlands.

The Presidium members are chosen from members of the Panel of Papua. Papua Panel itself consists of pillar groups. The Papua Council has four pillar groups: political detainees and prisoners (Tapol/Napol), women, the TPN/OPM, and West Papuan Youth and Customary Council of West Papua. Theys Eluay was the chairperson of the PDP until his killing by the Indonesian death squad affiliated to Kopassus on November 10, 2001, in Muara Tami Sub-District of Jayapura, West Papua.

Thom Beanal was the Vice Chaiman and the General Secretary was Thaha Alhamid.

The result of these efforts lead to formation of 100 members team of papuan who met President Habibie as well as his successors president Wahid. The result of which is the special autonomy law which is the result of papuan national congress in 2000.
