= Mambesak =

West Papuan music group

Mambesak ('Shining Bird') was a West Papuan folk-based musical group, formed in 1978 at Cenderawasih University. Mambesak articulated Papuan political concerns (for example, opposition to environmental problems connected by the mining industry), and in 1984 the lead figure of the group Arnold Ap was killed by the Indonesian military in 1984. Mambesak inspired the formation of similar Papuan musical groups.
