= Yustinus Murib =

Yustinus Murib (died November 5, 2003) was a West Papuan rebel who was the leader of the Free Papua Movement, a separatist group that since the 1960s has been fighting for independence from Indonesia. Shortly before being killed Murib sent letters to a few different world leaders and the United Nations, calling for an independent nation to be a mediator between Megawati Sukarnoputri and the Papuan independence movement. He and other leaders of the separatist movement had called for peace talks with the central government, however on November 6, 2003 Kopassus troops killed him and nine of his men. The Indonesian Army displayed his corpse as a trophy.
