= Arnold Ap =

Indonesian anthropologist and musician

- Born: 1 July 1946; Numfor Island, Netherlands New Guinea
- Died: April 26, 1984 (aged 37); Irian Jaya, Indonesia)
- Education: Cenderawasih University
- Occupation(s): Anthropologist and musician

Arnold Clemens Ap (born July 1, 1946, in Numfor Island, Netherlands New Guinea – died April 26, 1984, in Jayapura, Irian Jaya, Indonesia) was a West Papuan cultural leader, anthropologist and musician. Arnold was the leader of the group Mambesak, and curator of the Cenderawasih University Museum. He also broadcast Papuan culture on his weekly radio show.

He was educated at mission schools on Biak Island, where his father was a school teacher. He studied geography at the Teacher Training School of Cenderawasih University in Abepura from 1967 to 1973.

As a student, he organized a demonstration against the Act of Free Choice of 1969. He was sent to prison at Ifar Gunung. After his release, he began collecting traditional Papuan songs. After graduating, he became curator at the university's museum. In 1974, he was married to Corry Bukorpioper, a nurse.

In 1978, he formed the music group Mambesak. He performed in 1980 in Jakarta at the Cultural Festival with the Asmat Totem Pole Dance. He had a popular radio program Pelangi Budaya Irian Jaya (The Rainbow of Irian Jaya Culture) on RRI Jayapura, with Papuan songs, stories, poems and interviews. His prominent study and performance of Papuan culture and music was seen by many as a challenge to the efforts of the Indonesian government against Papuan nationalism and identity. At the time of Ap's death, strong attempts by the New Order government were being made to unify Indonesian peoples under a more Javanese culture.

In November 1983, he was arrested by the Indonesian military special forces Kopassus and imprisoned and tortured for suspected sympathies with the Free Papua Movement, although no charges were laid. In April 1984, he was killed by a gunshot to his back. Official accounts claim he was trying to escape. Many supporters believe Ap was executed by Kopassus. Another musician, Eddie Mofu, was also killed.

Arnold Ap and Mambesak are still popular in West Papua region, and their works are seen as symbols of Papuan identity. Since the 1990s, however, the Indonesian government has cautiously allowed safe expressions of indigenous cultural forms. According to Danilyn Rutherford, Associate Professor of Anthropology, University of Chicago, as of 2002 access to limited cultural expressivity facilitates images of tolerance and "unity in diversity," the official national motto.

== Sources ==
- Vlasblom, Dirk. 2004. 'Papoea. een Geschiedenis.' Amsterdam: pp 569–574, 623
- Hubatka, Frank (ed.). 2012. 'Arnold Ap's Vision.' (self published)
