= North Sumatra =

Province in Sumatra, Indonesia

North Sumatra Sumatera Utara
- Province
- Province of North Sumatra; Provinsi Sumatera Utara
- Coat of arms
- Motto: Tekun Berkarya, Hidup Sejahtera, Mulia Berbudaya "Work Diligently, Live Prosperously, Noble in Culture"
- North Sumatra in Indonesia
- Interactive map of North Sumatra
- Coordinates: 2°00′N 99°00′E
- Country: Indonesia
- Region: Sumatra (Western Indonesia)
- Established: 15 April 1948
- Capital and largest city: Medan

Government
  - Body: North Sumatra Provincial Government
  - Governor: Bobby Nasution (Gerindra)
  - Vice Governor: Surya
  - Legislature: North Sumatra Regional House of Representatives (DPRD)

Area
  - Total: 72,437.755 km^{2} (27,968.374 sq mi)
  - Rank: 8th in Indonesia
- Highest elevation (Sinabung): 2,460 m (8,070 ft)

Population (mid 2025 official estimate)
  - Total: 15,785,839
  - Density: 217.92281/km^{2} (564.41748/sq mi)

Demographics
  - Ethnic groups (2010): 44.75% Batak; 32.41% Javanese; 7.05% Nias; 5.97% Malays; 3.63% Chinese; 9.82% other
  - Religion (2023): 66.85% Islam; 30.77% Christianity; 26.50% Protestantism; 4.27% Catholicism; 2.25% Buddhism; 0.01% Hinduism; 0.01% Confucianism
  - Languages: Indonesian (official); Batak, Nias, Malay (native, regional); Other languages: Javanese, Hokkien, Minangkabau, Acehnese, Banjarese
- Time zone: UTC+7 (Indonesia Western Time)
- ISO 3166 code: ID-SU
- Vehicle registration: BB (West Coast); BK (East Coast)
- GDP (nominal): 2022
- Total: Rp 955.2 trillion (6th); US$64.3 billion; Int$200.7 billion (PPP)
- Per capita: Rp 68.3 million (14th); US$ 4,481; Int$13,280 (PPP)
- Growth: ▲4.73%
- HDI (2024): ▲0.758 (8th) high
- Website: sumutprov.go.id

North Sumatra (Indonesian: Sumatera Utara, Batak: ᯘᯮᯔᯖᯩᯒ ᯥᯖᯒ) is a province of Indonesia located in the northern part of the island of Sumatra. Its capital and largest city is Medan on the east coast of the island. It borders Aceh to the northwest, Riau to the southeast, West Sumatra to the south, the Indian Ocean to the west, and the Strait of Malacca (with a maritime border with Malaysia) to the east.

With a population of around 14.8 million in 2020 and a mid-2025 estimate of 15.8 million (and adding about 200,000 people each year), North Sumatra is Indonesia's fourth most populous province and the most populous province outside of Java Island. At 72,437.755 square kilometres (27,968.374 mi^{2}), North Sumatra is the third-largest province in area on the island of Sumatra behind South Sumatra and Riau. Major ethnic groups include the Malay, native to the east coast; several Batak groups, indigenous to the west coast and central highlands; the Nias people of Nias Island and its surrounding islets; and Chinese, Javanese, and Indian peoples, who first migrated to Sumatra during Dutch rule.

North Sumatra is home to the Toba supervolcano, located in what is now Lake Toba, which erupted 74,000–75,000 years ago, wiping out nearly all of humanity. The super-eruption resulted in the creation of Lake Toba and was rated a VEI-8 eruption.

During Dutch rule, North Sumatra was administered under the Gouvernement van Sumatra, which governed the entire island of Sumatra out of Medan. In 1948, after Indonesia's independence was proclaimed, Sumatra Province was divided into three sub-provinces, each of which had the right to regulate and manage its own affairs. The 15th of April was later designated as the anniversary of the founding of the province of North Sumatra.

== History ==
=== Prehistoric era ===
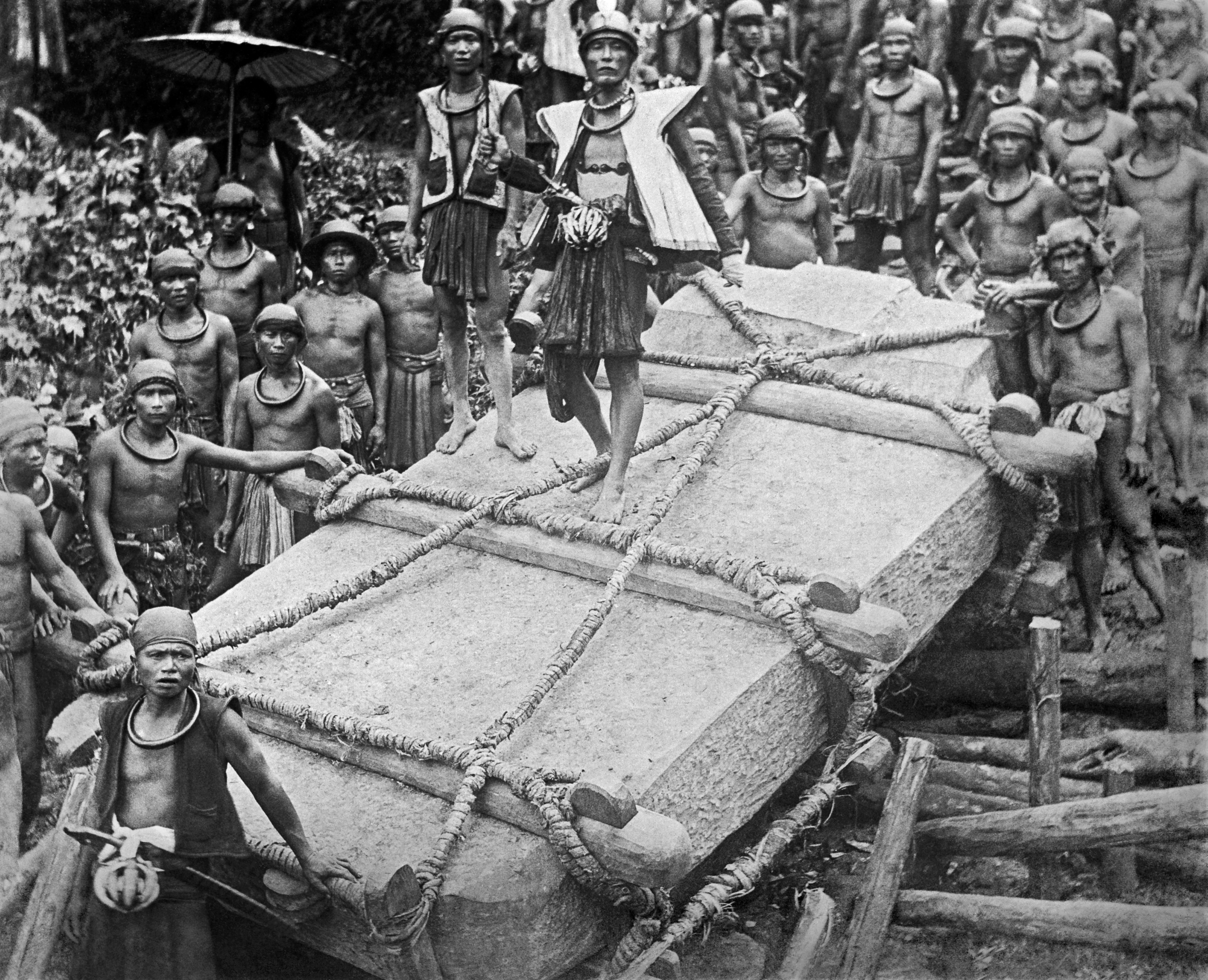
Darodaro, big stones used as memorials by the Nias people, being hauled in Bawomataluo village in a thousand-year-old practice

Archaeological understanding of early North Sumatran peoples is limited compared to that of other nearby regions. Prehistoric relics in North Sumatra show that the oldest population may have been Austronesian or Melanesian. Archaeological evidence indicates that their dispersal took place in the Mesolithic era (Middle Stone Age). They spread to the eastern part of Indonesia, to the island of Papua, and to the west, to North Sumatra and the Malay Peninsula. Early people in North Sumatra consumed mostly snails and clams, leaving large shell deposits sometimes referred to as kjokkenmoddinger (kitchen waste), some of which are still found as hills in Saentis, Hinai, Tanjung Beringin, along the Deli-Langkat shore, and on riverbanks.

In the second wave of migration from mainland Southeast Asia c. 1000 BC, the Young Malays or Deutero Malays settled on the coast. They mainly lived by fishing and by cultivating the marshy land for agriculture. Their villages were scattered along the big rivers that flow to the east coast of North Sumatra such as Besitang, Wampu, Asahan, and Barumun. Larger villages grew at the mouths of rivers and became centres of government. Relics of the Mesolithic era have been found in North Sumatra, including finely honed stone axes, bone tools, and painting materials.

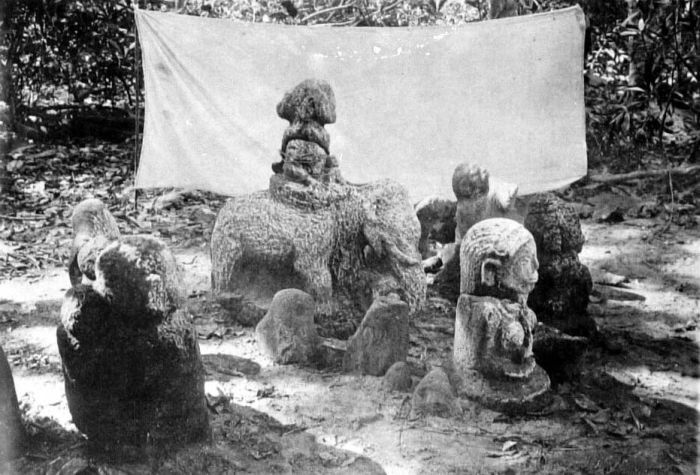
Situs Hopong in Dolok Sanggul, stone statue sites that are possible evidence of prehistoric Batak civilization

Linguistic and archaeological evidence indicate that Austronesian speakers reached Sumatra from Taiwan and the Philippines through Borneo or Java about 2,500 years ago, and the Batak probably descended from these settlers.

New genetic research has found that the Nias people also came from the Austronesian peoples, though their initial ancestors may have arrived earlier: ancestors of the Nias people are thought to have come from Taiwan through the Philippines 4,000 to 5,000 years ago. Ten years of research involving blood samples of 440 Nias people in 11 villages on Nias island show similarities between their Y-chromosome and mitochondrial DNA and that of Taiwanese and Filipino peoples.

=== Early historic era ===
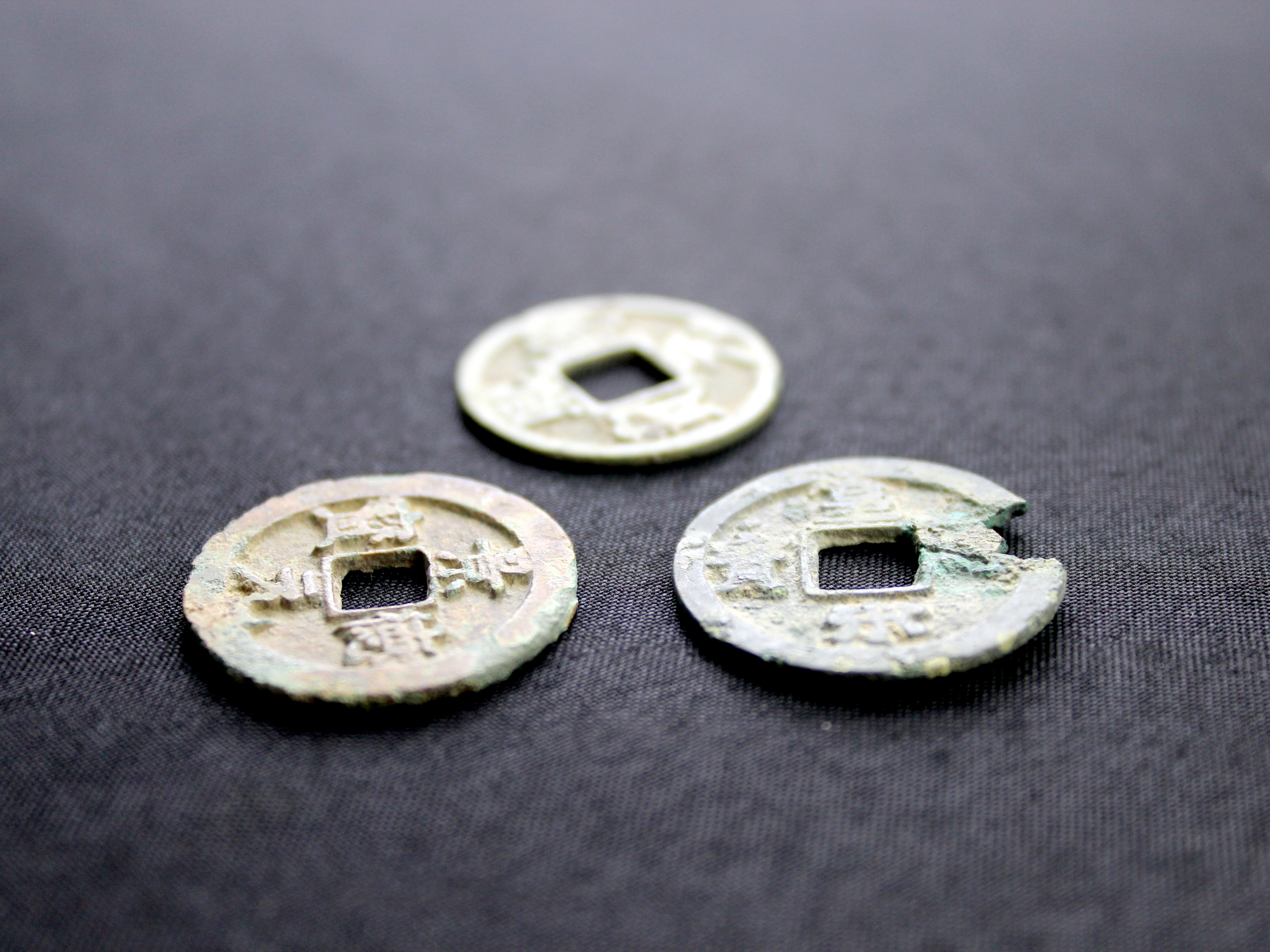
Coins founded in Situs Kota Cina, Labuhan Deli, presumably used for trading during the Yuan dynasty, 12th to 13th century AD

The eastern coast of North Sumatra, bordering the Strait of Malacca, has been widely visited by Hindus and by Chinese traders for centuries since the founding of early Situs Kota Cina or Chinatown sites in Hamparan Perak c. 11th–14th centuries AD. Barus, a trading port on the western coast of Tapanuli, attracted Middle Age era traders in search of camphor, which was popular in Ancient Egypt. In 1030, Rajendra Chola recorded the names of North Sumatran states he defeated in one expedition to conquer Srivijaya. The states that he mentioned included Sriwijaya, Malayur, Kendara, and the Panai Kingdom. Furthermore, the Nagarakretagama epic by Mpu Prapanca from the 14th century lists states found in North Sumatra such as Pane, Haru, Mandailing, Tamiang, Lawas, and Barus, all of which were mainly defeated by the Majapahit.

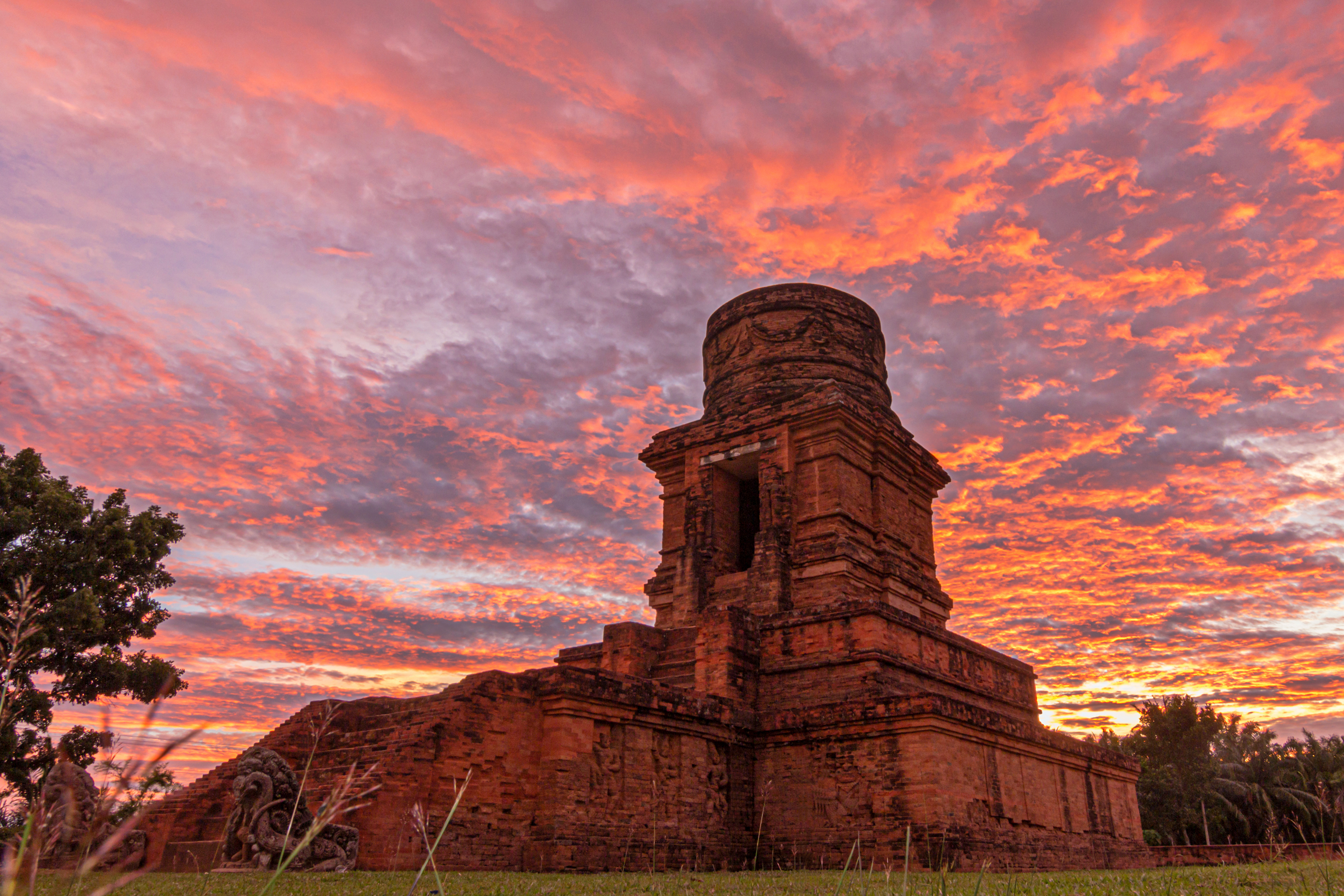
Bahal temple, also known as Portibi, is a Buddhist candi complex in Bahal village, North Sumatra. The temple site is linked to the Pannai Kingdom c. 11th to 13th century AD.

The earliest kingdom that was present on the eastern coast of North Sumatra was the Aru Kingdom, which existed from the 13th to the 16th century AD. In its height, the kingdom was a maritime power and controlled the northern part of the Malacca strait. The kingdom was initially established as a Karo polity. The indigenous population practiced native animism and Hinduism. Starting in the 13th century, some also practiced Islam. Aru's capital was located close to present-day Medan and Deli Serdang. Its people are believed to have been descendants of the Karo people from the hinterland of North Sumatra.

An area near Lake Toba called Batakland (or the Batak Lands) housed kingdoms of Batak people. It was first mentioned in Zhao Rugua's 13th-century Description of the Barbarous Peoples, which refers to a 'Ba-ta' dependency of Srivijaya. The Suma Oriental, written in the 15th century, also refers to the "Kingdom of Bata" between Pasai and the Aru kingdom. The Batak mainly practiced animism and cannibalism and remained isolated from foreign culture and kingdoms like Srivijaya and Majapahit. The Toba people divided the Batak Lands into several independent kingdoms, which often entered into defensive alliances. Of the many kingdoms, Bakkara and their king or Sisingamangaraja held the most leverage due to customs and traditions which consider Bakkara the place of origin of the Batak people.

The Nias people on Nias Island remained isolated during its early era. Its people practiced agriculture and cultivation, made art carvings, and adhered to shamanist and pagan practices.

=== Kingdom, sultanate, and colonial era ===
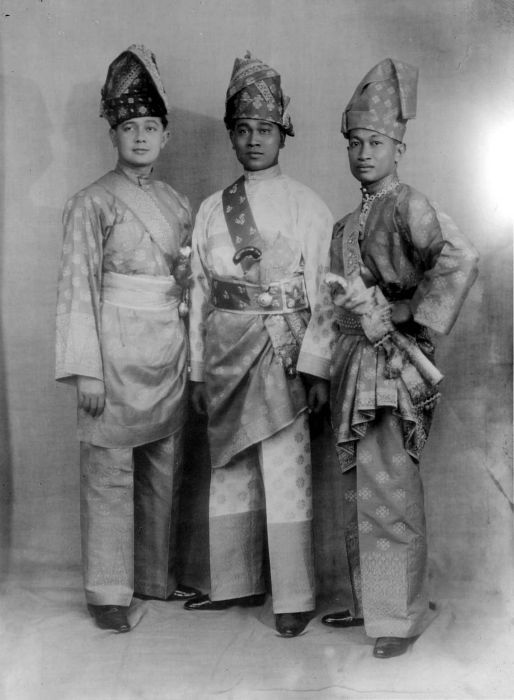
Princes from the Sultanate of Deli, Langkat and Serdang in Sumatra

By c. 1500, there were several kingdoms on the east coast of Sumatra, namely the larger Nagur and Aru kingdoms and the smaller Panai and Batangiou kingdoms. To the west, in the hinterland of Tapanuli, another kingdom emerged: a Batak kingdom founded by descendants of Sisingamangaraja. This kingdom gradually expanded its influence throughout Tapanuli to Angkola, Mandailing, and Dairi. The three largest kingdoms in North Sumatra in the sixteenth century were Nagur, the Batak kingdom under the rule of King Sisingamangaraja, and Aru.

Wars between these three kingdoms made the region vulnerable to outside influences from Aceh, Melaka, the Portuguese, Siak, and Minangkabau. The Sultanate of Aceh worked to spread Islam across the eastern coast, and in the Padri War, succeeded in spreading Islam into the southern Tapanuli kingdom. As a result of this warfare and cultural shifts, the three big kingdoms split into several small kingdoms and sultanates, including Deli, Serdang, Asahan, Langkat Sultanate, Maropat and Lingga.

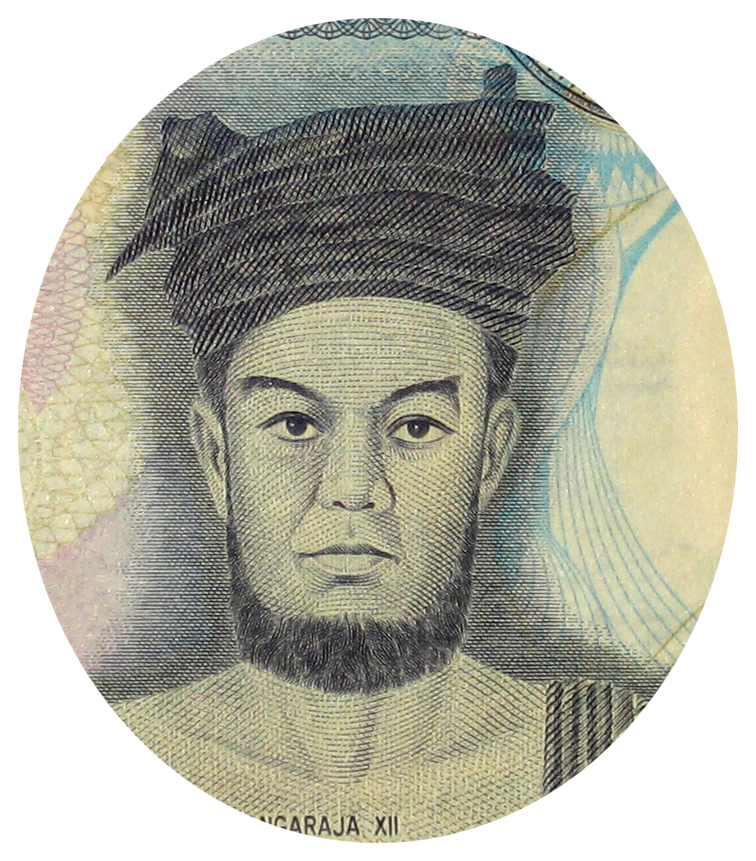
Portrait of Sisingamangaraja XII, painted by Augustin Sibarani, from the obverse of the 1,000 rupiah banknote (1987 series)

Malacca fell to the Dutch East India Company (the VOC) in 1641. Coastal areas of North Sumatra felt economic impacts as the VOC subsequently reduced the presence of trade in Malacca and shifted resources towards Batavia. Nevertheless, North Sumatra also saw an increase in Arab, Chinese and Indian traders.

After Britain gained a position on the nearby island of Penang by establishing a trading post for the British East India Company (Britain's first such post in the Far East) in 1786, the British traded heavily with the east coast of Sumatra. Prior to the nineteenth century, Dutch power was concentrated on the island of Java and parts of the Moluccas, the Dutch East India Company competed with the British East India Company for trade in the area, especially for pepper, with the two nations trying to obstruct the other's trade efforts. In the nineteenth century, the Dutch began to focus more on areas outside Java, including North Sumatra, driving out British influence. Dutch control was formalized with the handover of most of Indonesia in the 1814 Treaty of London, which was renewed in the 1824 Treaty of London. However, the UK maintained a presence in several places that were considered important for trade, including parts of Sumatra and Kalimantan.

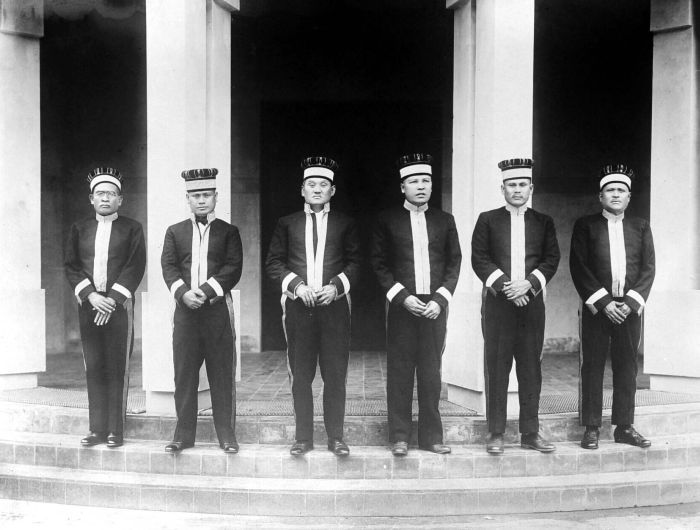
Simalungun headchiefs of East Sumatra residency, Dutch-East Indies

During the Padri War, in the years prior to 1860, Dutch forces arrived in South Tapanuki at the request of a local leader to provide protection. The Siak sultan subsequently signed a treaty with the Dutch East Indies government recognizing Dutch authority over it and the sultanates of Asahan, Serdang, Deli and Langkat. The Dutch proceeded further into Batakland and North Sumatra, invading Toba, Karo Highland, Nias and Silindung with the help of Christian missionaries, such as Ludwig Ingwer Nommensen, who worked to evangelise the area. The Dutch invasion into Batakland met resistance by Sisingamangaraja XII, causing a guerilla war lasting 30 years until and Sisingmangaraja XII's death in battle and a subsequent Dutch victory. Meanwhile, particularly after 1869, Dutch tobacco plantation activities expanded on the east coast, including the establishment of Deli Maatschappij and London Sumatra, using land leased from the Malay sultans. As there was a worker shortage, the Dutch began importing labourers from Java, Southern China and Southern India. This first big wave of migration established substantial Javanese, Chinese, and Indian populations in North Sumatra that remain to this day. By 1874, the sultanates had been formally included within the Dutch East Indies, and in Deli, the sultan of Deli granted the Dutch sole rights over taxation and leases, in exchange for an annual pension. That year, the East Coast Residency was established.

On March 12, 1942, Japanese forces landed in Palubuhan Ruku on the east coast, and advanced on Medan. The advance force reported it had captured the town the next day. The main force followed on bicycles. There was some resistance from the Dutch forces, particularly around Pematangsiantar, but the last major town, Sibolga, fell on 15 March. During the Japanese occupation of North Sumatra, the leader of the Japanese Armed Forces was centred in Bukittinggi, moving the de facto capital out of the Dutch centre of Medan. The occupation lasted 3 years. In 1945 the Japanese occupation officially ended with Japan's surrender in the Pacific and two days later Sukarno declared Indonesian Independence, beginning the four-year Indonesian War of Independence against the Dutch.

=== Independence and contemporary era ===
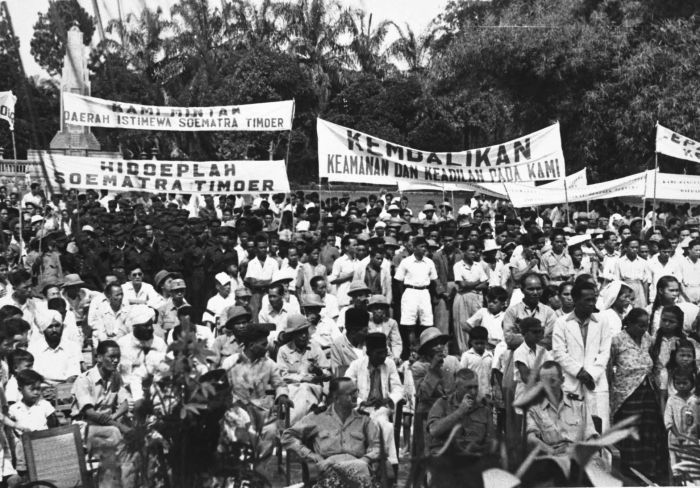
East Sumatra rally in Pematangsiantar, between 1945 and 1950

Beginning on 3 March 1946, there was a social revolution in East Sumatra. Across 25 "native states", many sultanates were overthrown. Armed pergerakan groups (Indonesian nationalists) conducted mass killings of the members of aristocratic families. To opportunistic pergerakan militants (including Communist Party of Indonesia members Xarim MS and Luat Siregar), the revolutionary movement was seen as a means for East Sumatra to be freed from colonial rule and to join the larger Indonesian National Revolution. Participants of the revolution were believed to be provoked by leaders to kill aristocrats and create violence with three prime objectives: to eliminate the sultans and aristocrats (who were seen as Dutch allies), to seize their wealth (to fund the Indonesian independence campaign), and to eliminate the region's feudal social structure.

The Dutch authorities, working with the East Sumatra Union (Persatuan Sumatra Timur), which had been formed in 1938 by westernized Malay elites to reassert Malay and Simalungun ethnic interests, established the State of East Sumatra (Indonesian: Negara Sumatra Timur (NST)) as part of the planned United States of Indonesia. The state lasted from December 1947 to August 1950. In addition to the Dutch, the NST state was supported by Malay aristocrats, most of the Simalungun rajas, some Karo chieftains, and Chinese groups who felt that the revolution threatened their interests. Dr Tengku Mansu, a member of the Asahan royal family, was selected as head of state for the NST. While the Dutch wanted the NST to be seen as an orderly and progressive alternative to the republic, western-educated aristocrats saw it as a bastion for their own ethnic interests. Following the Dutch-Indonesian Round Table Conference in late 1949, the Dutch withdrew military support for the State of East Sumatra and its local authority began to collapse. The short-lived state was viewed with suspicion, and Dr Tengku Mansur entered into negotiations with Mohammad Hatta to reunify East Sumatra with the Republic of Indonesia in May 1950. Mansur surrendered authority to the republic and East Sumatra merged with Tapanuli to become the province of North Sumatra on August 15, 1950.

After Indonesian independence, at the first session of the National Committee of Regions (KND), Sumatra was divided into three sub-provinces: North Sumatra, Central Sumatra and South Sumatra. North Sumatra was an amalgamation of three administrative regions called Residencies: the Residency of Aceh, the East Sumatra Residency, and the Residency of Tapanuli. The publication of the Law of the Republic of Indonesia (R.I.) No. 10, Year 1948 on April 15, 1948, formalized the division of these three provinces. The date of 15 April 1948 has been subsequently celebrated as the anniversary of North Sumatra Province.

Act R.I. No. 24 of 1956, promulgated on 7 December 1956, established a separate Aceh Province, independent of the province of North Sumatra.

== Geography ==
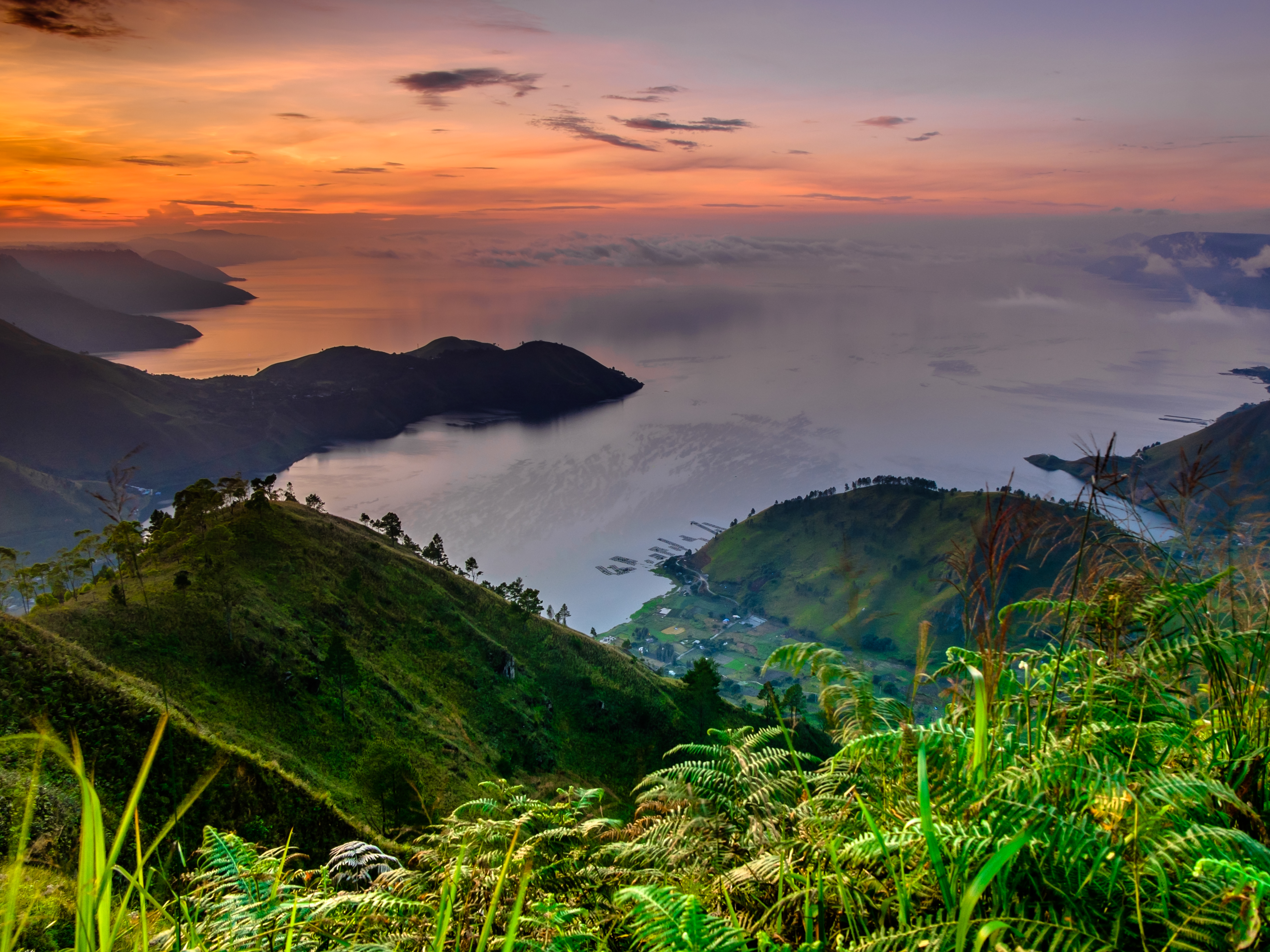
Lake Toba, world's largest volcanic lake

The province of North Sumatra stretches across the island of Sumatra, between the Indian Ocean and the Strait of Malacca, with an area of 72,437.755 km^{2}. It borders the province of Aceh to the northwest and Riau and West Sumatra to the southeast. The province contains a broad, low plain along the Strait of Malacca on which the provincial capital, Medan, is located. In the south and west, the land rises to the Bukit Barisan mountain range that runs the length of Sumatra; the mountains here surround Lake Toba, which was formed from the caldera of an ancient volcano. Several large islands in the Indian Ocean off the west coast of Sumatra are currently part of North Sumatra, most notably Nias Island and the Batu Islands.

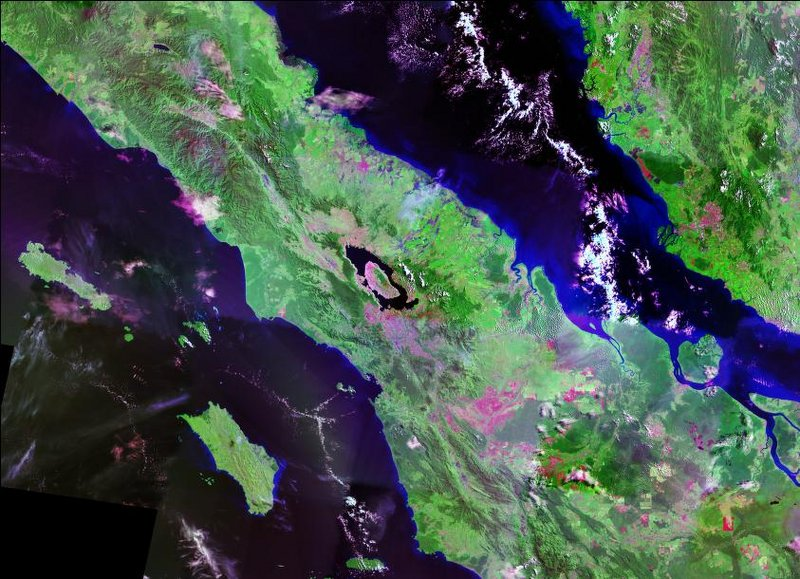
Satellite photo of North Sumatra and Nias Island with Lake Toba in the centre

There are 419 islands in North Sumatra. The outer islands include the island of Simuk (the most westerly of the Batu Islands) and the island of Berhala in the Strait of Malacca. The Nias archipelago, located off the coast of western Sumatra in the Indian Ocean, consists of Nias Island and other much smaller islands in its vicinity. Its administrative centre is located at the city of Gunungsitoli on the northeast coast of Nias. The Batu Islands, just southeast of Nias, consist of 51 islands including three major islands: Pini, Tanahbala and Tanahmasa. Pulau Telo is their administrative centre on the small island of Situasi. Other islands in North Sumatra include Imanna, Pasu, Bawa, Hamutaia, Batu Makelele, Masa, Bau, Simaleh, Makole, Jake, and Wunga.

Half of the province is located on a high plateau that runs along the Bukit Barisan mountains, from central North Sumatra to the western coast. The tallest mountain in the province is Mount Sinabung in Karo Regency, at elevation around 2,460 metres (8,070 ft), the most active volcano in the region. Volcanic activities (cracks where steam, gas, and lava are emitted) were observed at the summit in 1912; recent documented events include an eruption in the early hours of 29 August 2010 and eruptions in September and November 2013, January, February and October 2014. Another volcano nearby is Mount Sibayak, also located in the Karo highland, sitting at an elevation of 2,181 metres (7,156 ft). Crystalline sulfur deposits on Mount Sibayak have historically been mined on a small scale, and seepage of sulfurous gases has caused acidic discolouration of its small crater lake.

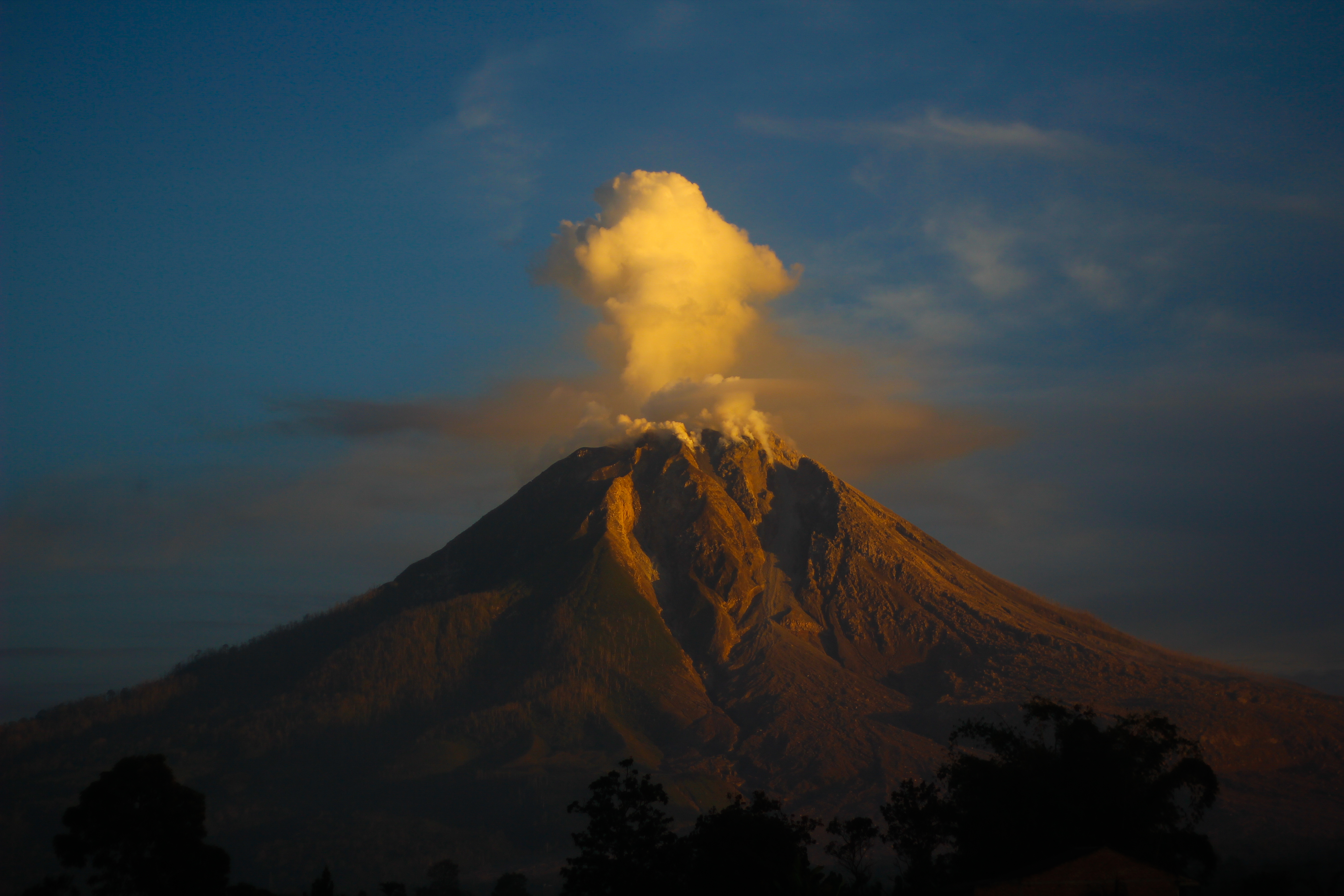
Mount Sinabung emitting vog, as seen from the village of Kandibata, Karo Regency, 2017.

Lake Toba is the site of a supervolcanic eruption that occurred 69,000 to 77,000 years ago, estimated at VEI 8, that formed a climate-changing event. Recent advances in dating methods suggest more precise dating at 74,000 years ago. It is the largest-known explosive eruption on Earth in the last 25 million years. It has been accepted that the eruption of the Toba Caldera led to a volcanic winter with a worldwide decrease in temperatures between 3 and 5 °C (5.4 and 9.0 °F), and up to 15 °C (27 °F) in higher latitudes. Additional studies in Lake Malawi in East Africa show significant amounts of ash deposited by the Toba Caldera eruptions, despite a great distance from the area, but these studies offer little indication of a significant climatic effect in East Africa. According to the Toba catastrophe theory, the eruption killed most humans living at that time and is believed to have created a population bottleneck in central East Africa and India, affecting the human genome to the present day. More recent studies have cast doubt on this theory and found no evidence of substantial changes in population.

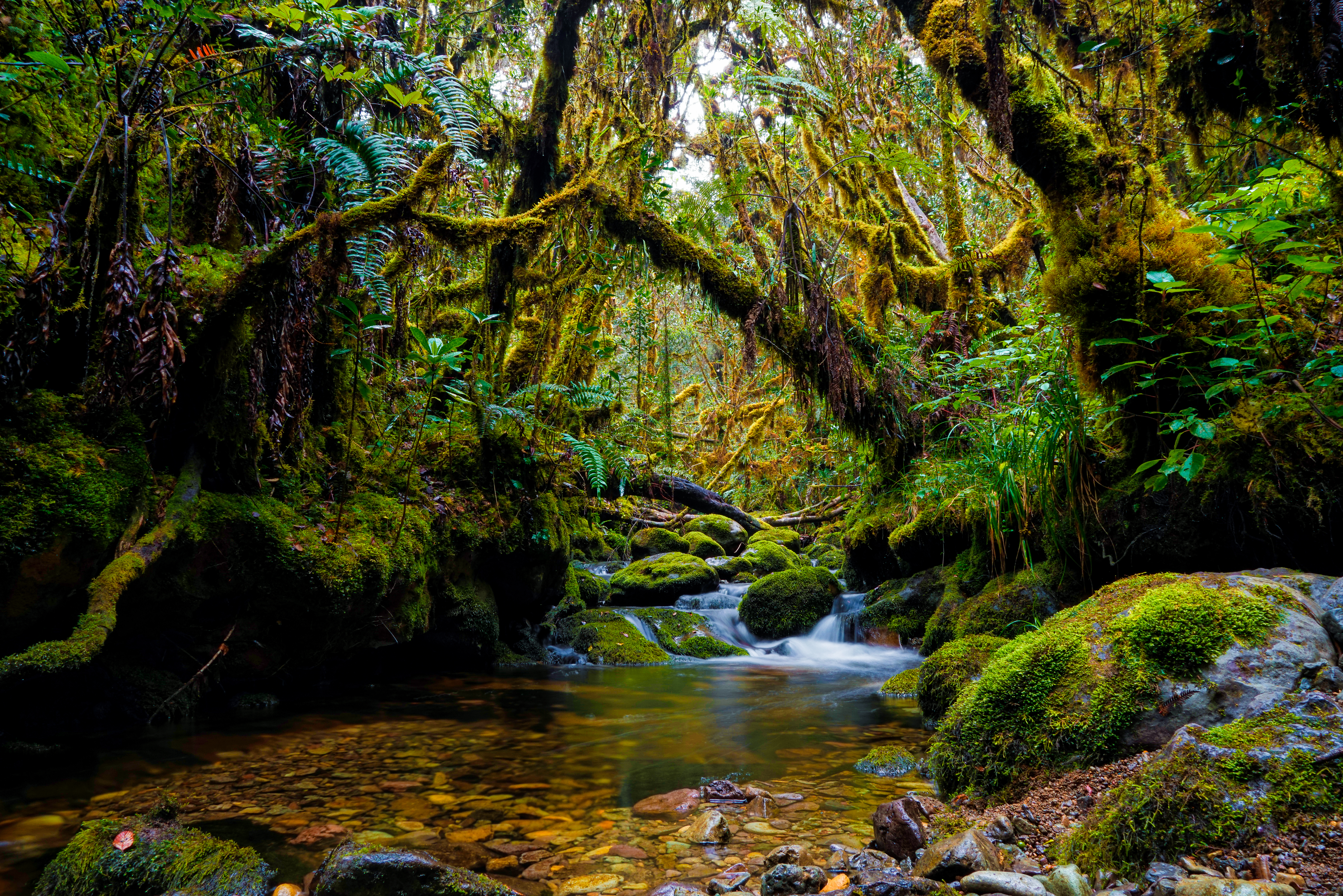
Mount Leuser National Park

In North Sumatra, there are currently two national parks: the Gunung Leuser National Park and Batang Gadis National Park. According to the Ministerial Decree No. 44 of 2005, forest area in North Sumatra today covers 3,742,120 hectares (9,247,000 acres), consisting of a 477,070-hectare (ha) Natural Reserve Area/Natural Conservation Area, 1,297,330 ha of protected forest, 879,270 ha of limited production forest, 1,035,690 ha of permanent production forest, and 52,7600 ha of production forest that can be converted to another status.

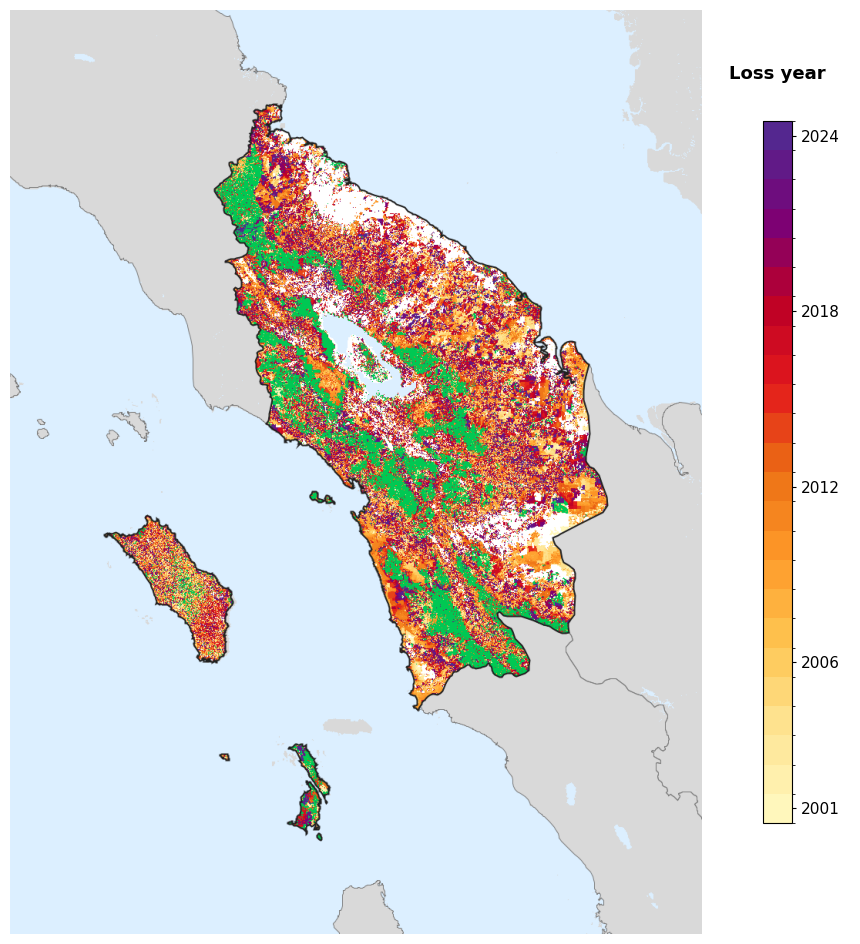
Tree-cover loss year in North Sumatra, 2001-2024, from the Global Forest Change dataset.

However, the above figure is only de jure. In reality, the forests are not as large as the figures suggest. A lot of the forests are damaged, due to encroachment and illegal logging. So far, over 206,000 ha of forests in Sumatra have experienced changes in function. As many as 163,000 ha were converted to plantations and 42,900 ha were transmigration areas.

== Governance ==
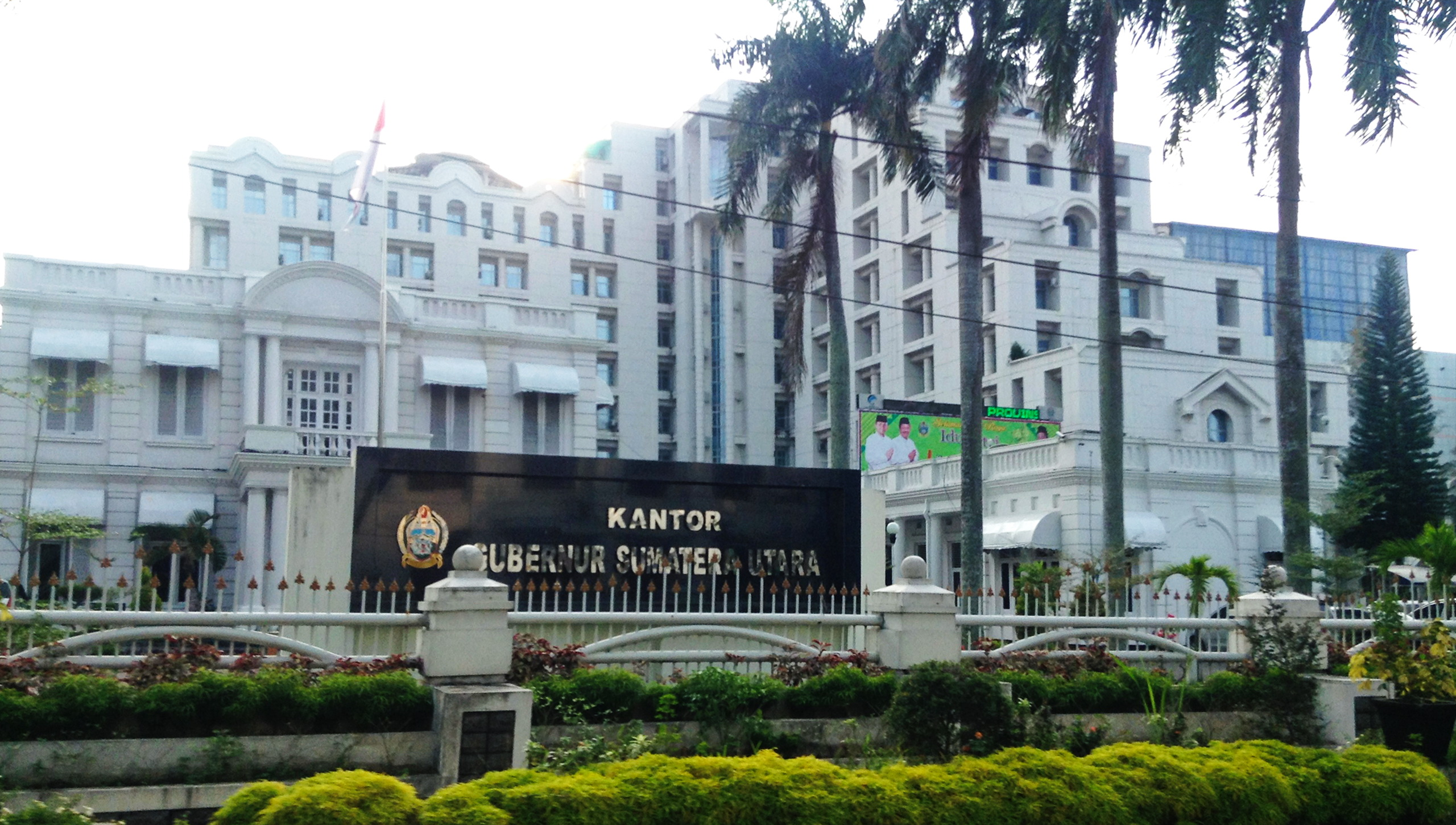
North Sumatra governor main office, Medan

The administrative centre of North Sumatra is located in the city of Medan, governed by a governor. Earlier governments ruled all of Sumatra (1945–1950); and a North Sumatra Province that included Aceh (1950–1956). In 1956, Aceh split off to form a separate Aceh Province.

=== Administrative divisions ===
North Sumatra is currently subdivided into 25 regencies (kabupaten) and 8 autonomous cities (formerly municipalities). When originally created as a province with its current boundaries, it was composed of 10 regencies and 6 cities, but an 11th regency (Dairi Regency) was created on 23 September 1964. Fourteen more new regencies and two new cities were created between 1998 and 2008. All these are listed below with their areas and their populations at the 2010 census and the 2020 census, together with their official estimates for mid-2025. Regencies and cities are sub-divided into 455 districts, which in turn are further sub-divided into 6,110 villages (as of early 2024). Proposals have been under consideration since 2013 by the People's Representative Council (Dewan Perwakilan Rakyat or DPR) to create three new provinces from parts of the present North Sumatra: Nias Islands, Tapanuli, and East Sumatra; however since 2013 the Indonesian Government have maintained a moratorium on the intended creation of new provinces, regencies and cities. The present regencies and cities are grouped for convenience below according to the projected new provinces within which they are situated:

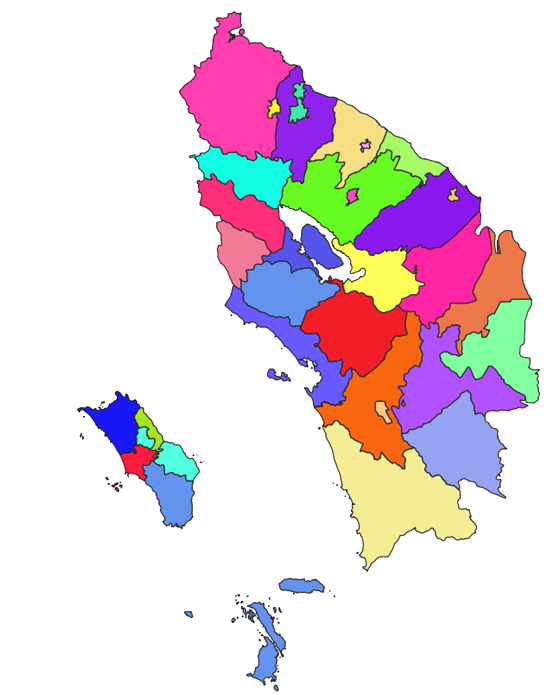

==== Nias Islands Region ====
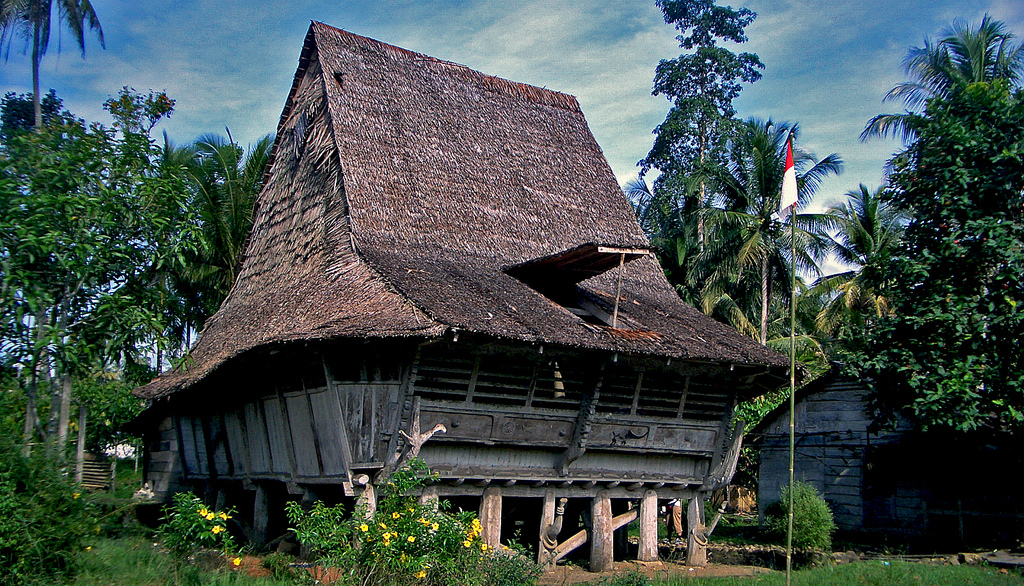
Omo Sebua, means "the big house". It refers to a traditional house from South Nias, in which formerly the king of Tano Niha lived, and is located in Bawomataluo

This region contains the substantial island of Nias and various small offshore islands, including the Batu Islands to the south. Originally it comprised a single Nias Regency (created on 7 November 1956), but on 25 February 2003 the southern part of the island (including the Batu Islands) was split off to form a separate South Nias Regency. On 29 October 2008 two new regencies - North Nias and West Nias - together with the city of Gunungsitoli, were split off from the remainder of Nias Regency, which thus now covers less than 17% of the island.

Kode Wilayah	English name of city or regency	Local name of city or regency	Established by statute ^{(a)}	Area in km^{2}	Pop'n census 2010	Pop'n census 2020	Pop'n estimate mid-2025	Capital	HDI 2022
12.78	Gunungsitoli City	Kota Gunungsutoli	UU 47/2008	208.742	126,202	136,017	147,516	Gunungsitoli	0.702 (High)
12.04	Nias Regency	Kabupaten Nias	UU 7/1956	902.599	131,377	146,672	157,513	Gidö	0.639 (Medium)
12.14	South Nias Regency ^{(b)}	Kabupaten Nias Selatan	UU 9/2003	2,531.590	289,708	360,531	397,224	Teluk Dalam	0.631 (Medium)
12.24	North Nias Regency	Kabupaten Nias Utara	UU 45/2008	1,239.502	127,244	147,274	161,442	Lotu	0.637 (Medium)
12.25	West Nias Regency	Kabupaten Nias Barat	UU 46/2008	464.650	81,807	89,994	99,124	Lahomi	0.629 (Medium)
	Totals			5,346.993	756,338	880,550	962,819		

Notes: (a) UU is an abbreviation from Undang-Undang (the Indonesia statute of law).
(b) South Nias Regency includes the Batu Islands.

The region include 124 smaller offshore islands - 87 in South Nias Regency (primarily the Batu Islands), 11 in West Nias Regency, 19 in North Nias Regency and 7 in Nias Regency.

==== Tapanuli Region ====
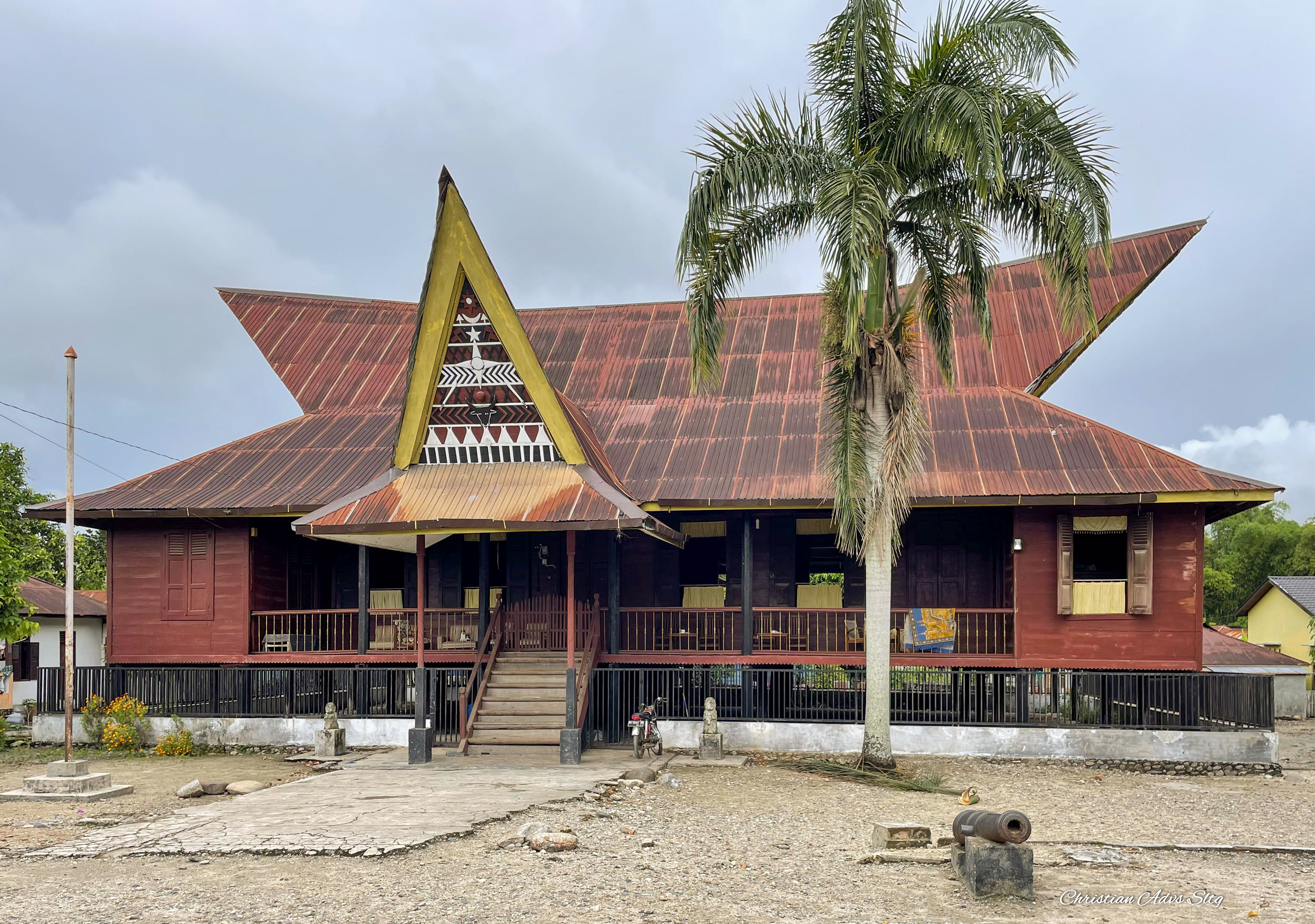
A photo of Bagas Godang in Panyabungan, Mandailing Natal

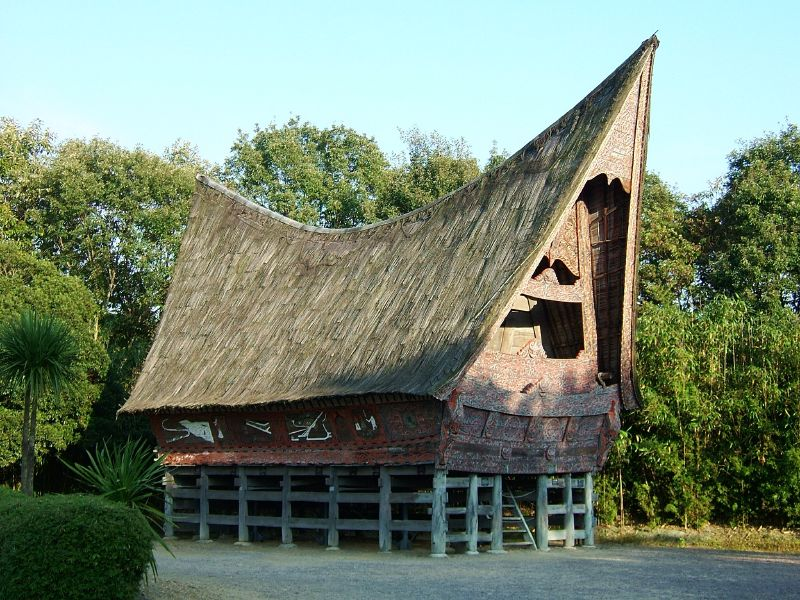
Old Batak Toba Village, or known as Bolon House (Rumah Bolon) in Simanindo

This region comprises the southwestern part of the province on the island of Sumatra, and equates to the former Tapanoeli Residency which existed at the time of independence (except for Nias Island). When the province was created, the region comprised three regencies (North Tapanuli, Central Tapanuli and South Tapanuli) and the city of Sibolga. A fourth regency - Dairi - was created on 23 September 1964 from part of North Tapanuli Regency. Two more new regencies were formed on 23 November 1998 - Mandailing Natal from part of South Tapanuli Regency, and Toba Samosir from another part of North Tapanuli Regency. The city of Padang Sidempuan was split off from South Tapanuli Regency on 21 June 2001. Two further regencies were formed on 25 February 2003 - Humbang Hasundutan from part of North Tapanuli Regency, and Pakpak Bharat from part of Dairi Regency. A new Samosir Regency was created from part of Toba Samosir Regency on 18 December 2003 (more recently, the remaining part of this regency was renamed Toba Regency). Another two regencies were created on 17 July 2007 - Padang Lawas and North Padang Lawas, both from parts of South Tapanuli Regency.

Kode Wilayah	English name of city or regency	Local name of city or regency	Established by statute	Area in km^{2}	Pop'n census 2010	Pop'n census 2020	Pop'n estimate mid-2025	Capital	HDI 2022
12.11	Dairi Regency	Kabupaten Dairi	UU 4/1964	2,083.604	270,053	308,764	336,403	Sidikalang	0.725 (High)
12.15	Pakpak Bharat Regency	Kabupaten Pakpak Bharat	UU 9/2003	1,365.607	40,481	52,351	57,246	Salak	0.688 (Medium)
12.17	Samosir Regency	Kabupaten Samosir	UU 36/2003	1,850.035	119,653	136,441	144,813	Pangururan	0.716 (High)
12.12	Toba Regency	Kabupaten Toba	UU 12/1998	2,291.616	173,129	206,199	219,580	Balige	0.759 (High)
12.02	North Tapanuli Regency	Kabupaten Tapanuli Utara	UU 7/1956	3,895.604	279,257	312,758	330,856	Tarutung	0.741 (High)
12.16	Humbang Hasundutan Regency	Kabupaten Humbang Hasundutan	UU 9/2003	2,351.514	171,650	197,751	209,460	Dolok Sanggul	0.703 (High)
12.01	Central Tapanuli Regency	Kabupaten Tapanuli Tengah	UU 7/1956	2,307.716	311,232	365,177	402,904	Pandan	0.703 (High)
12.73	Sibolga City	Kota Sibolga	UU 7/1956	12.645	84,481	89,584	92,244	Sibolga	0.747 (High)
12.03	South Tapanuli Regency	Kabupaten Tapanuli Selatan	UU 7/1956	4,201.534	263,815	300,911	320,330	Sipirok	0.709 (High)
12.77	Padang Sidempuan City	Kota Padang Sidempuan	UU 32/1982	159.298	191,531	225,105	243,843	Padang Sidempuan	0.760 (High)
12.20	North Padang Lawas Regency	Kabupaten Padang Lawas Utara	UU 37/2007	3,944.413	223,531	260,720	285,659	Gunung Tua	0.709 (High)
12.21	Padang Lawas Regency	Kabupaten Padang Lawas	UU 38/2007	3,914.413	225,259	261,011	285,704	Sibuhuan	0.695 (Medium)
12.13	Mandailing Natal Regency	Kabupaten Mandailing Natal	UU 12/1998	6,546.567	404,945	472,886	513,536	Panyabungan	0.680 (Medium)
	Totals			34,924.386	2,759,017	3,189,658	3,442,578		

The region includes 60 small offshore islands - 24 in Mandailing Natal, 31 in Central Tapanuli (the largest being Mursala Island off Sibolga) and 5 in Sibolga City, plus 7 islands in the landlocked Lake Toba comprising 1 in North Tapanuli Regency (Pulau Sibandang), 5 in Samosir Regency and 1 in Humbang Hasundutan Regency.

==== East Sumatra Region ====
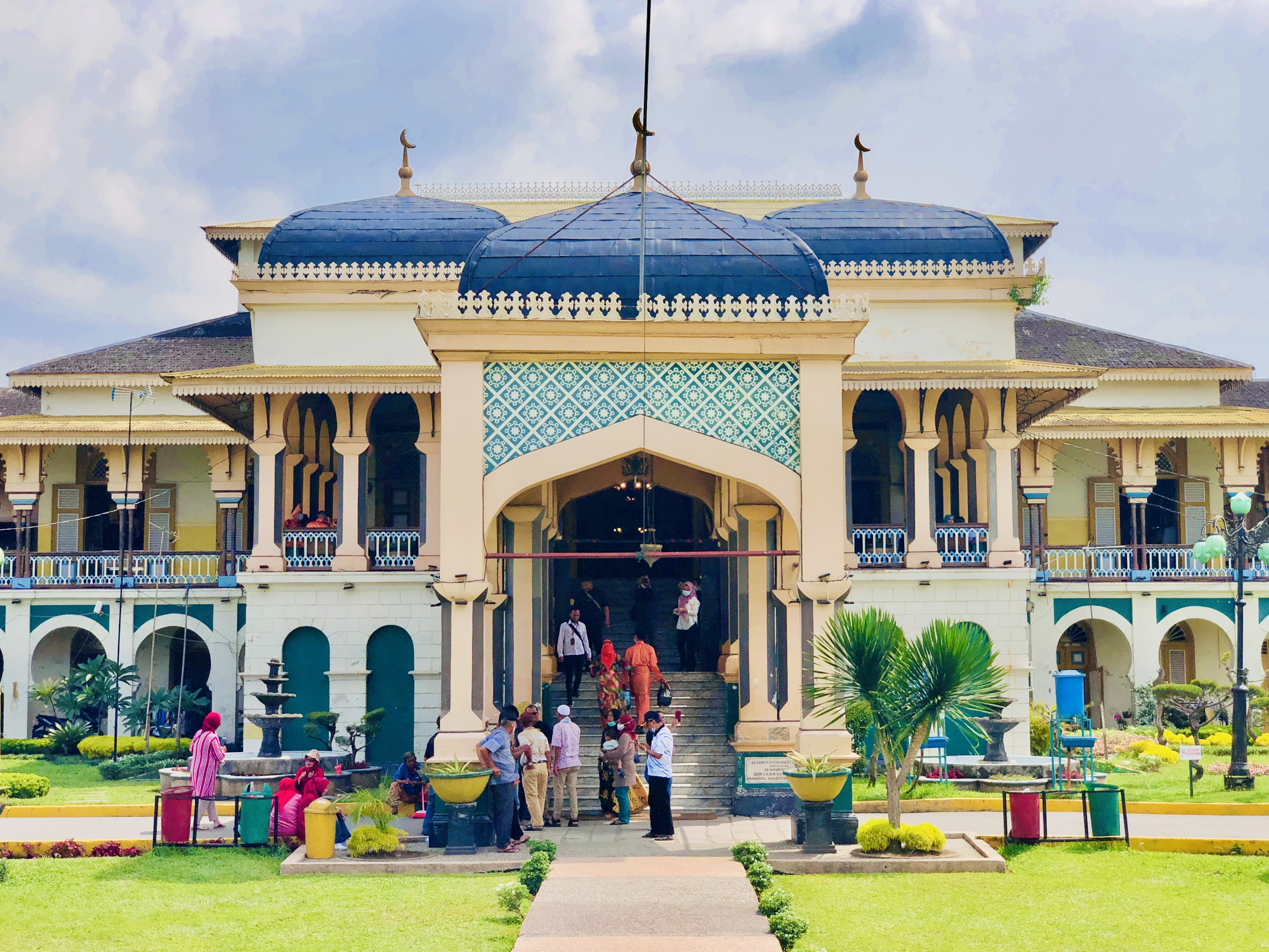
Maimoon Palace, a historical palace in Medan. It was used as the residence for the Sultan of Deli for a long time and is still in active use to this day.

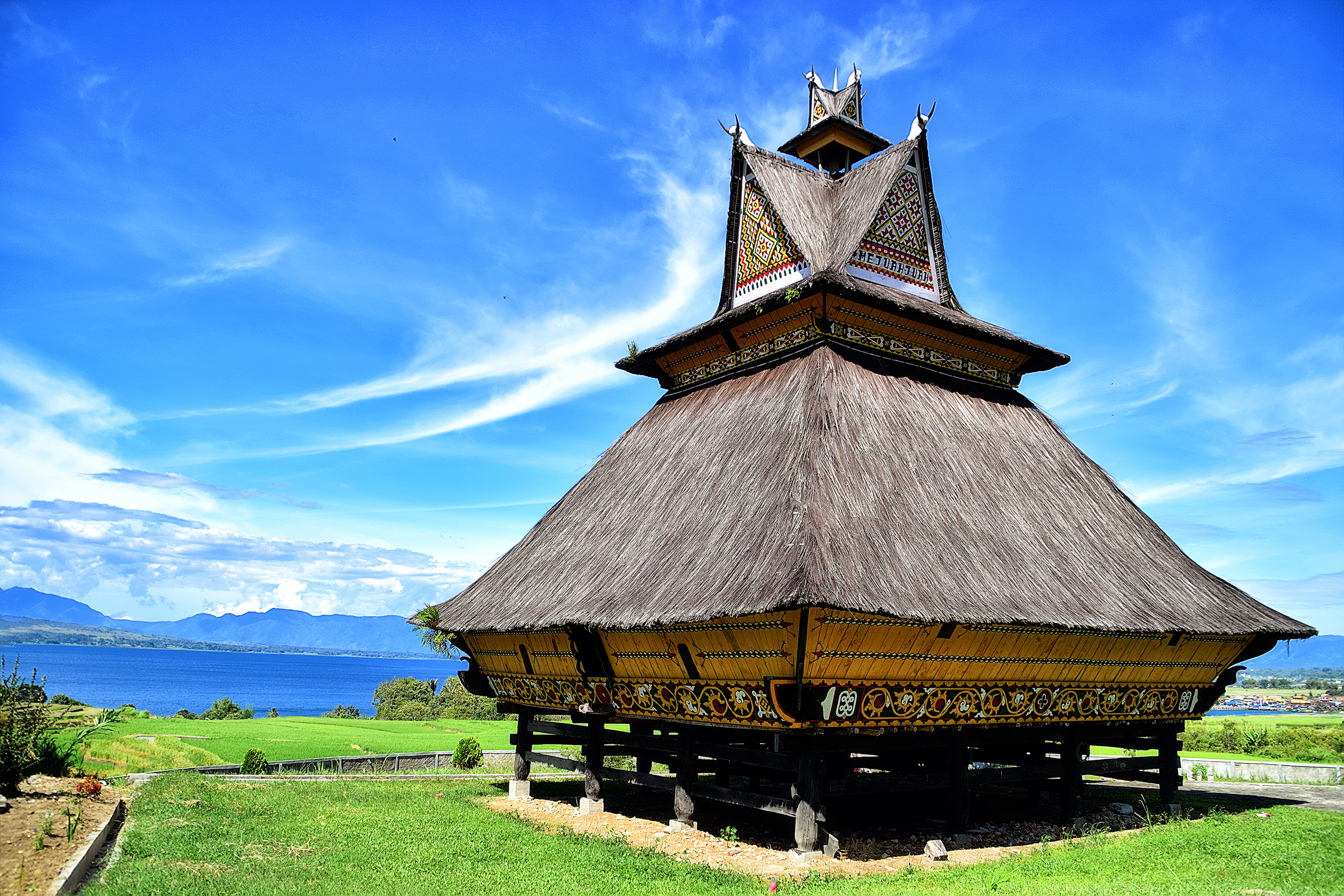
Siwaluh Jabu, Batak Karo traditional house, located in Karo Highlands

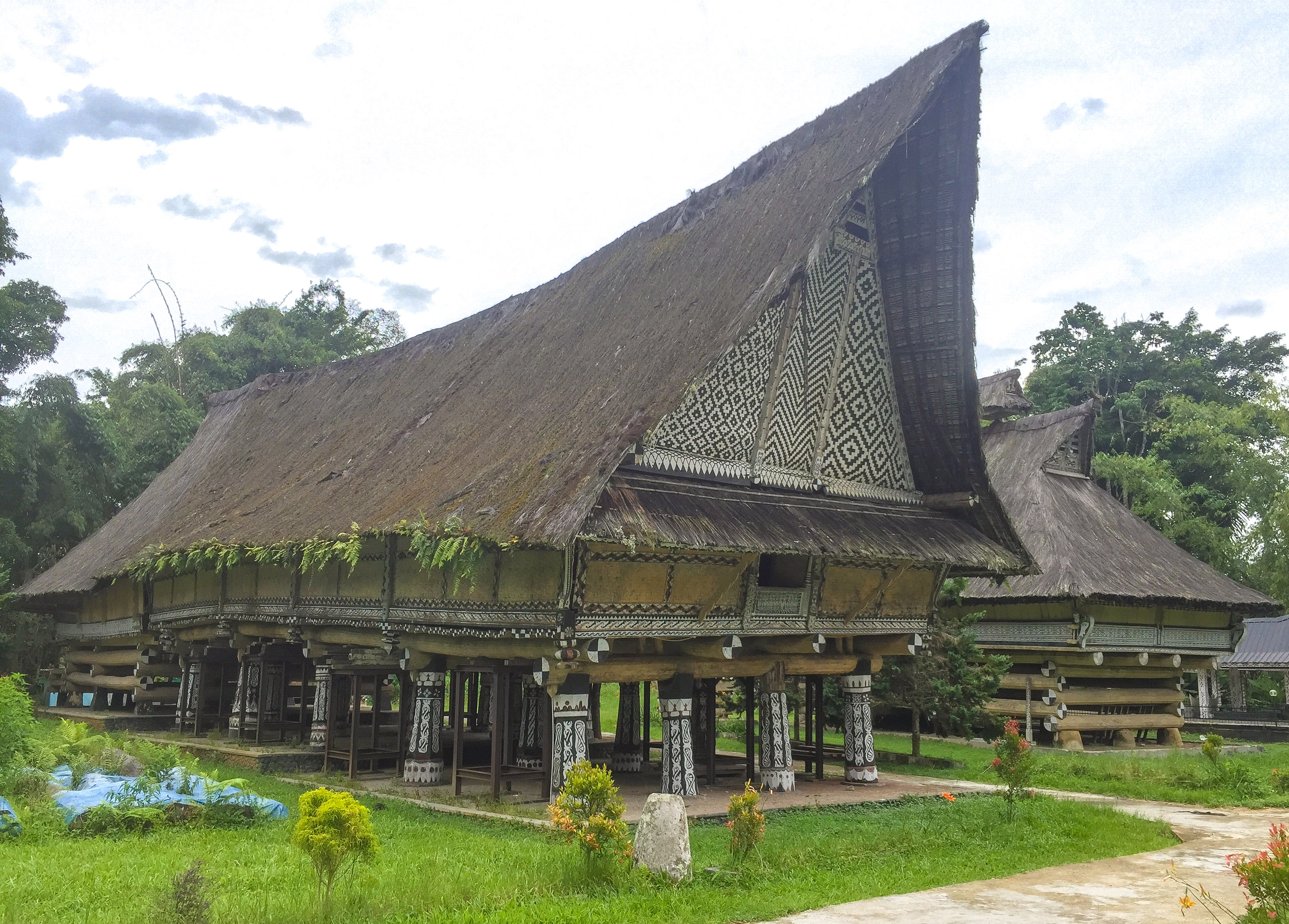
Simalungun Rumah Bolon in Pamatang Purba, Simalungun

The region comprises the northeastern part of the province on the island of Sumatra, and equates to the former State of East Sumatra which existed at the time of independence. It now covers ten regencies and five cities, but originally there were just six regencies and the five cities. The new regency of Serdang Bedagai was formed on 18 December 2003 from part of Deli Serdang Regency, and the new regency of Batubara was formed on 2 January 2007 from part of Asahan Regency. Two further regencies were formed on 24 June 2008 - North Labuhanbatu and South Labuhanbatu - both from parts of Labuhanbatu Regency.

Kode Wilayah	English name of city or regency	Local name of city or regency	Established by statute	Area in km^{2}	Pop'n census 2010	Pop'n census 2020	Pop'n estimate mid-2025	Capital	HDI 2022
12.05	Langkat Regency	Kabupaten Langkat	UU 7/1956	6,142.072	967,535	1,030,202	1,089,969	Stabat	0.718 (High)
12.75	Binjai City	Kota Binjai	UU 9/1956	93.770	246,154	291,842	310,932	Binjai	0.769 (High)
12.07	Deli Serdang Regency	Kabupaten Deli Serdang	UU 7/1956	2,581.482	1,790,431	1,931,441	2,078,046	Lubukpakam	0.761 (High)
12.71	Medan City	Kota Medan	UU 24/1956	279.239	2,097,610	2,435,252	2,498,293	Medan	0.817 (Very High)
12.06	Karo Regency	Kabupaten Karo	UU 7/1956	2,206.876	350,960	404,998	432,049	Kabanjahe	0.753 (High)
12.08	Simalungun Regency	Kabupaten Simalungun	UU 7/1956	4,601.477	817,720	990,246	1,067,499	Raya	0.737 (High)
12.72	Pematangsiantar City	Kota Pematangsiantar	UU 7/1956	75.919	234,698	268,254	279,198	Pematang- siantar	0.797 (High)
12.18	Serdang Bedagai Regency	Kabupaten Serdang Bedagai	UU 36/2003	1,949.978	594,383	657,490	700,077	Sei Rampah	0.712 (High)
12.76	Tebing Tinggi City	Kota Tebing Tinggi	UU 7/1956	39.170	145,248	172,838	182,968	Tebing Tinggi	0.761 (High)
12.19	Batubara Regency	Kabupaten Batubara	UU 5/2007	888.676	375,885	410,678	443,998	Limapuluh	0.695 (Medium)
12.09	Asahan Regency	Kabupaten Asahan	UU 7/1956	3,738.420	668,272	769,960	824,597	Kisaran	0.711 (High)
12.74	Tanjungbalai City	Kota Tanjungbalai	UU 7/1956	60.072	154,445	176,027	188,063	Tanjungbalai	0.698 (Medium)
12.23	North Labuhan Batu Regency	Kabupaten Labuhan Batu Utara	UU 23/2008	3,687.179	330,701	381,994	415,485	Aek Kanopan	0.727 (High)
12.10	Labuhan Batu Regency	Kabupaten Labuhan Batu	UU 7/1956	2,772.346	415,248	493,899	527,043	Rantau Prapat	0.729 (High)
12.22	South Labuhan Batu Regency	Kabupaten Labuhan Batu Selatan	UU 22/2008	3,079.610	277,673	314,094	342,225	Kota Pinang	0.721 (High)
	Totals			32,196.286	9,466,963	10,729,215	11,380,442		

The region includes 38 offshore islands - 11 in Langkat Regency, 1 in Deli Serdang, 1 in Medan City, 2 in Serdang Bedagai, 1 in Simalungun, 2 in Batubara, 4 in Asahan, 8 (riverine islands) in Tanjungbalai City, 2 in North Labuhanbatu and 6 in Labuhanbatu Regency.

=== National Electoral Districts ===
The province comprises three of Indonesia's 84 national electoral districts to elect members to the People's Representative Council. Each of the three districts elects 10 members to the People's Representative Council (for a total of 30 members from the province).

- The North Sumatra I Electoral District consists of 2 of the regencies in the province (Deli Serdang and Serdang Bedagai), together with the cities of Medan and Tebingtinggi.
- The North Sumatra II Electoral District consists of 16 regencies (Nias, South Nias, North Nias and West Nias; Samosir, Toba, North Tapanuli, Humbang Hasundutan, Central Tapanuli, South Tapanuli, North Padang Lawas, Padang Lawas and Mandailing Natal; Labuhan Batu, South Labuhan Batu and North Labuhan Batu), together with the cities of Sibolga, Padangsidempuan and Gunungsitoli.
- The North Sumatra III Electoral District consists of the remaining 7 regencies (Asahan, Simalungun, Dairi, Karo, Langkat, Pakpak Bharat and Batubara), along with the cities of Tanjungbalai, Pematangsiantar and Binjai.

== Demographics ==
=== Population ===
North Sumatra recorded a population of 12,985,075 in the 2010 national census, making it the 4th most populous province in Indonesia, with a sex ratio of 99.59 men per 100 women. The 2015 Intermediate census gave a total of 13,923,262, while the 2020 census gave a total of 14,799,361, and the official estimate for mid-2025 was 15,785,839 The mid-2025 total comprised 7,922,846 males and 7,862,993 females, giving a sex ratio of 100.76 men per 100 women.

=== Migration ===
It was reported in January 2024 that a group of 140 Rohingya people, consisting mostly of women and children had landed in Indonesia and been directed by the military to the North Sumatra region. This has been one of several groups that have arrived in the area over the preceding months.

Historical population
Year	Pop.	±%
1971	6,621,831	—
1980	8,360,894	+26.3%
1990	10,256,027	+22.7%
1995	11,114,667	+8.4%
2000	11,649,655	+4.8%
2010	12,982,204	+11.4%
2015	13,923,262	+7.2%
2020	14,799,361	+6.3%
2025	15,785,839	+6.7%
Source: Badan Pusat Statistik 2026 and earlier editions

=== Ethnic groups ===
Ethnic groups in North Sumatra (census 2010).
1. Batak (44.8%)
2. Javanese (32.4%)
3. Nias (7.05%)
4. Malay (5.97%)
5. Others (9.82%)

North Sumatra is a multi-ethnic province. The Malay people are regarded as the majority people of the east coast of the province, while the west coast of the province is mainly inhabited by the Batak (Pakpak, Angkola and Mandailing groups). The central region around Lake Toba to the northern Karo highland is predominantly inhabited by other Batak groups (Toba, Simalungun and Karo). The Nias people are indigenous to Nias Island and its surrounding islets. With the opening of tobacco plantations in East Sumatra during the colonial era, the colonial government employed many contract labourers for plantations, they were mainly Chinese, Javanese and Indian migrants, who were majority does not returned after end contract and decided to stay in North Sumatra. The rapid urbanisation in the province also attract neighbouring people from Aceh, Riau and West Sumatra, which is the Aceh and Minangkabau people presents.

Bataks make up 44.95% of the population, including the Batak Karo and Mandailing. The Javanese come second with 30.62%, the Malays add up to 5.92% and the ethnic Chinese comprise 5.75%. The Nias people make up around 4.10% and the rest are Minangkabau (2.66%), Acehnese (1.07%), ethnic Indian (1.00%) and other ethnic groups (1.15%).

Distribution of the Batak people and the Toba, Simalungun, Karo, Pakpak, Angkola and Mandailing sub-groups

The distribution of the tribes, clans, and ethnic groups in North Sumatra is as follows:

- Batak Toba: throughout North Sumatra, forming the majority in the Toba, Samosir, Humbang Hasundutan, and North Tapanuli Regencies.
- Batak Karo: mostly in the Karo Regency, Deli Serdang and Langkat Regencies, including Berastagi and Kabanjahe.
- Batak Mandailing: majority along the western coast: (South Tapanuli, Padang Lawas, Mandailing Natal, Central Tapanuli), and the rest in Medan, Padangsidempuan, Sibolga and Rantauprapat.
- Batak Pakpak: majority in Dairi Regency and Sidikalang.
- Batak Simalungun: majority in Simalungun and Pematangsiantar
- Batak Angkola: majority in North Tapanuli, Gunung Tua, North Padang Lawas, and South Tapanuli
- Malay: mostly in the east coast rurals, especially Langkat and Asahan.
- Nias: mostly in Nias Island (including Gunungsitoli), with a small population around the west coast.
- Javanese: mostly reside in east coast rural areas, and in west coast areas like Deli Serdang, Serdang Bedagai, Asahan and Labuhan Batu Regencies, and in urban communities like Medan and Tebingtinggi.
- Minangkabau people: mostly in Medan, Sibolga and Mandailing Natal.
- Indian: major east coast cities such as; Medan, Binjai, Tebing Tinggi, Pematangsiantar, Kisaran, Tanjungbalai and Deli Serdang.
- Acehnese people: Medan, Binjai up to northern parts such as Langkat.
- Chinese: major cities such as; Medan metropolitan area: (Medan, Binjai, Deli Serdang), Tanjungpura, Stabat, Tebing Tinggi, Tanjungbalai, Kisaran, Limapuluh, Rantauprapat, Pematangsiantar, Balige, Sibolga, Padangsidempuan, and Gunungsitoli.
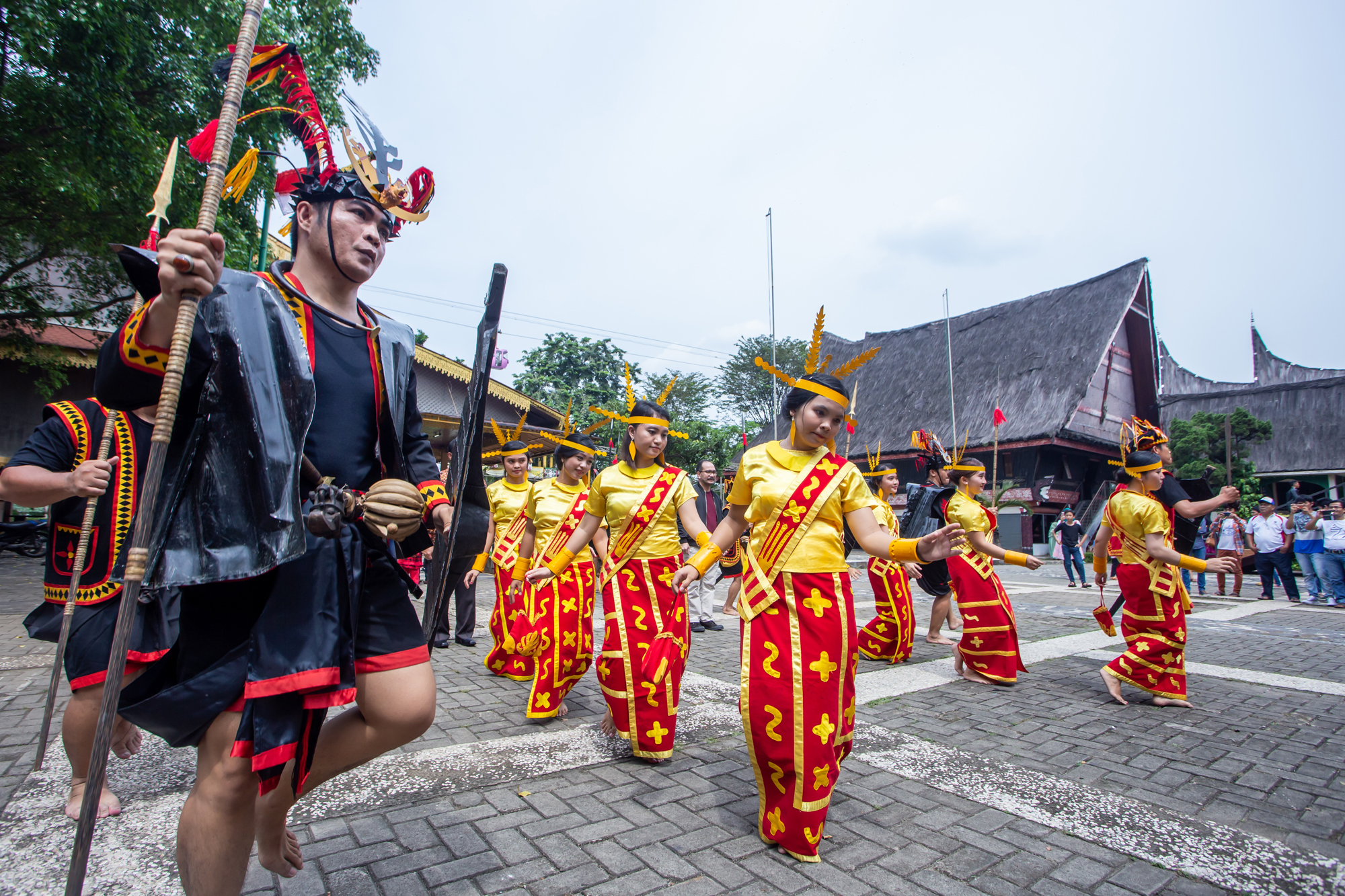
Moyo dance in Nias Island

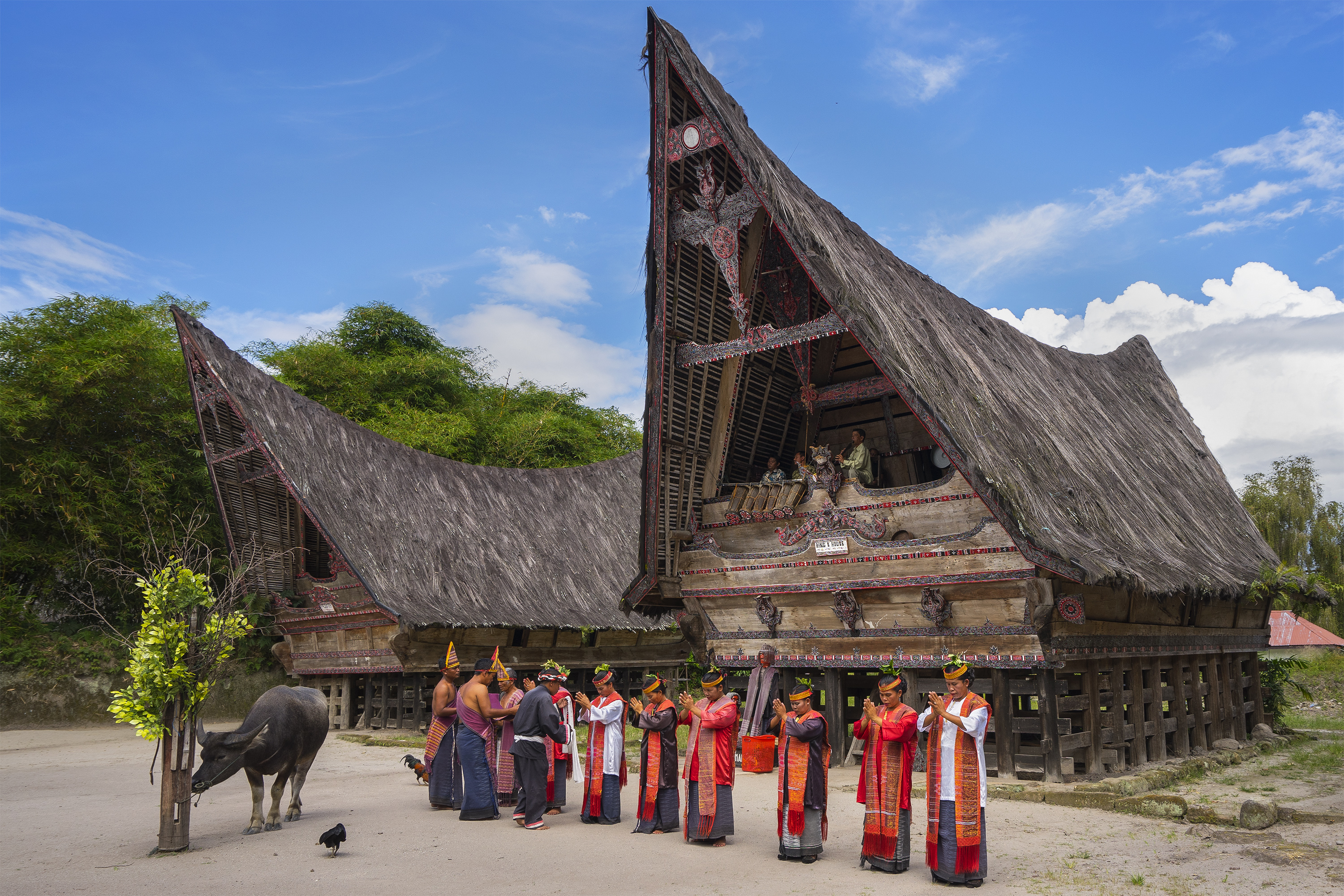
Bataknese Tor-tor dance in Samosir Island

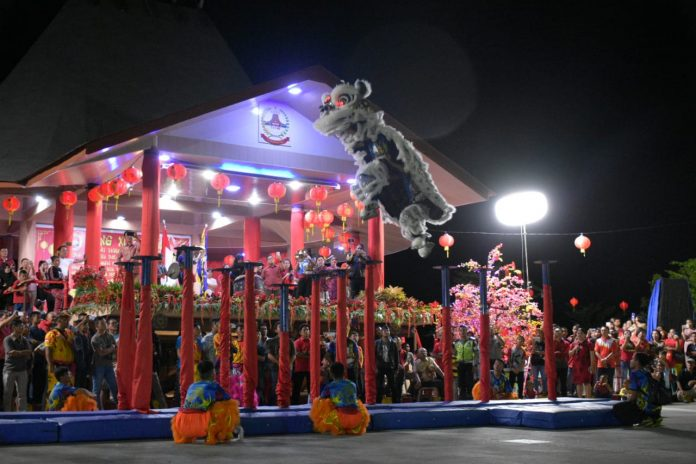
Cap Go Meh festival in Gunungsitoli, Nias Island

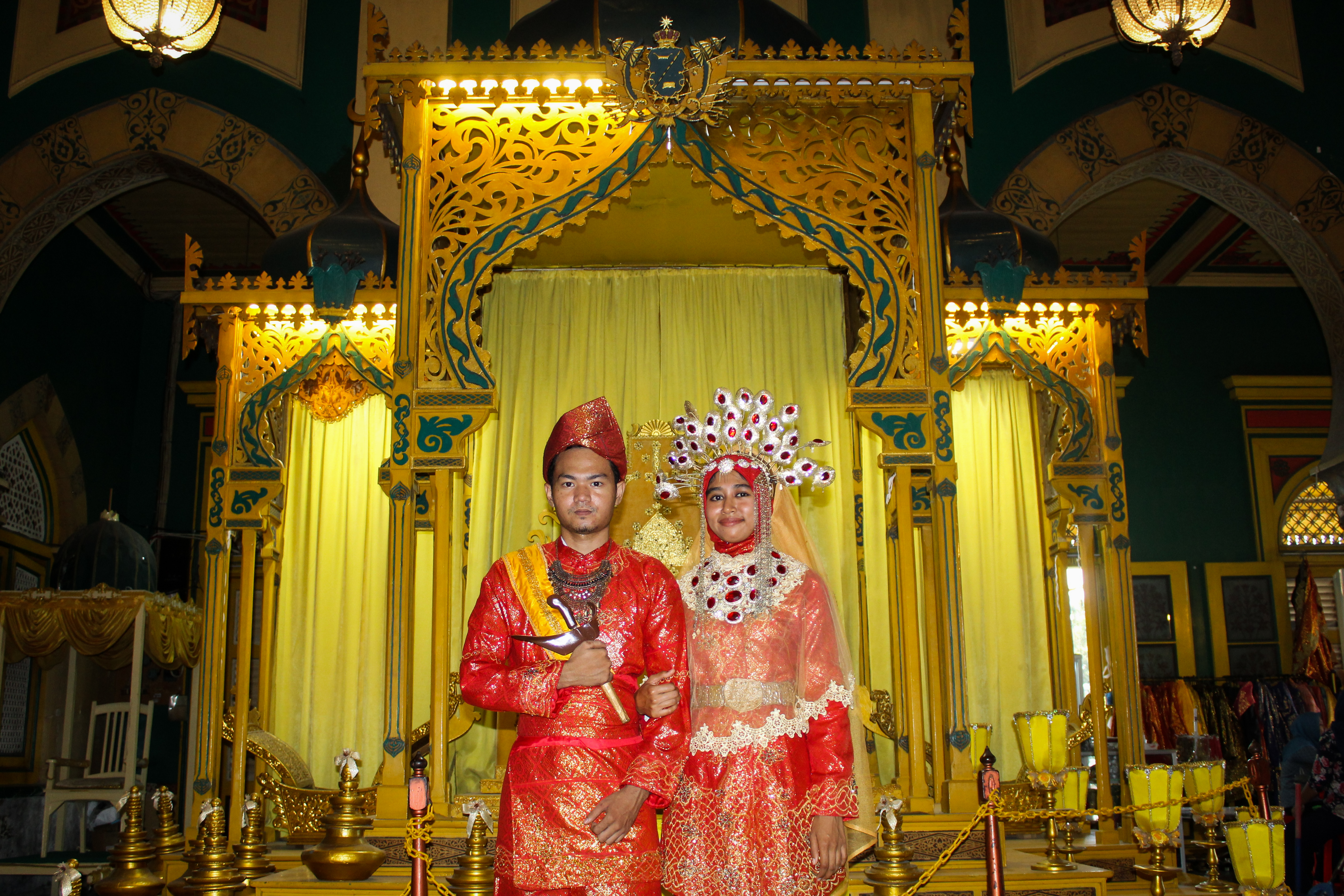
Malay-Deli bride in Maimoon Palace, Medan

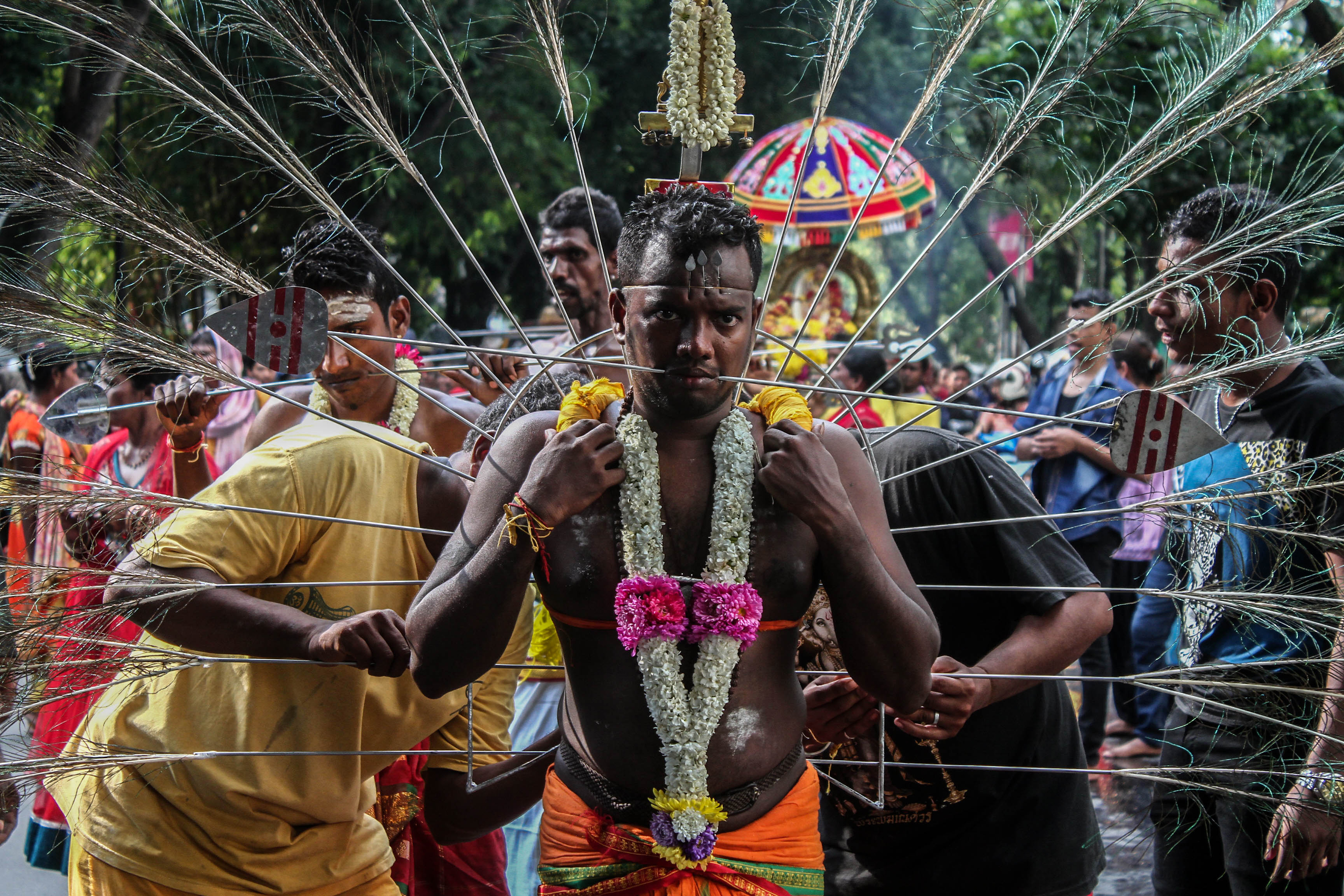
The Indian community celebrated Thaipusam festival in Medan

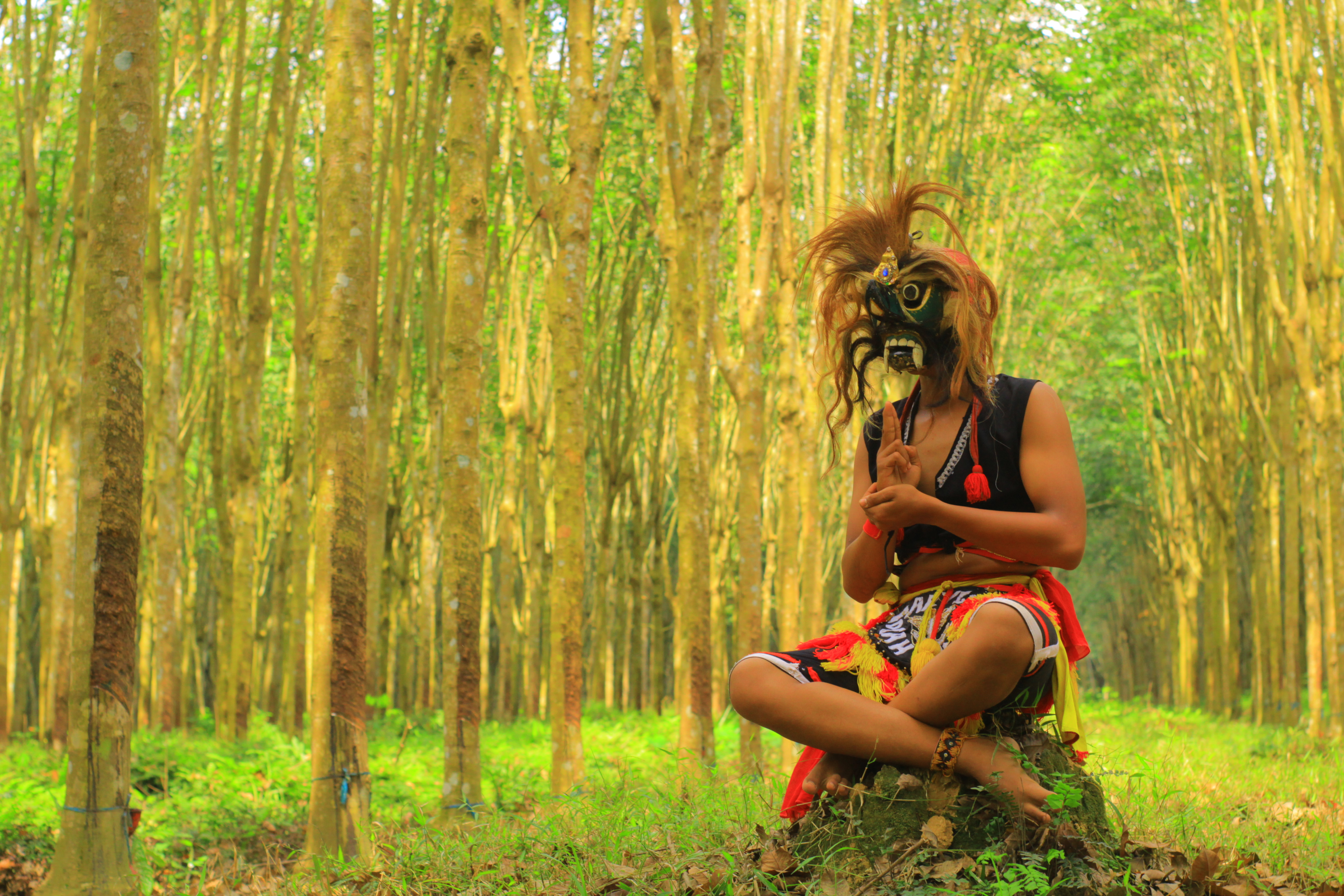
The Javanese Bujang Ganong masked dancer, part of Reog, in North Sumatra

=== Languages ===
As well as Indonesian, languages spoken in the province include various dialects of Batak languages (particularly around Lake Toba), Javanese (various regions in the east of the province, especially around Medan), Malay, Minangkabau and the Nias language (parts of Nias).

=== Religion ===
Religion in North Sumatra (2023)
1. Islam (66.8%)
2. Protestantism (26.5%)
3. Roman Catholicism (4.27%)
4. Buddhism (2.25%)
5. Confucianism (0.01%)
6. Hinduism (0.01%)

More than 95% of residents are either Muslim or Christian; the remainder are Buddhists, Hindus, or follow folk religions such as Confucianism, and Parmalim. These are the recognized religions of North Sumatra:

- Islam: especially embraced by the Malays, Minangkabau, Javanese, Aceh, Mandailing, Angkola, partly Nias, and partly Chinese, Batak Toba, Karo, Simalungun and Pakpak
- Christianity (Protestantism and Catholicism): especially embraced by Batak Toba, Karo, Simalungun, Nias, Pakpak and partly Batak Angkola, partly Javanese, Chinese and Indian
- Buddhism: mainly embraced by Chinese in urban areas, partly Javanese and Indian
- Confucianism, Taoism and Chinese folk religion: predominantly embraced by Chinese in urban areas
- Hinduism and Sikhism: especially embraced by Indian in urban areas, there are also small Batak Karo people that practising Hinduism in rural areas
- Traditional religion such as Parmalim/Pemena: embraced by most of the Batak tribe centred in Huta Tinggi, Laguboti district, Toba Samosir Regency
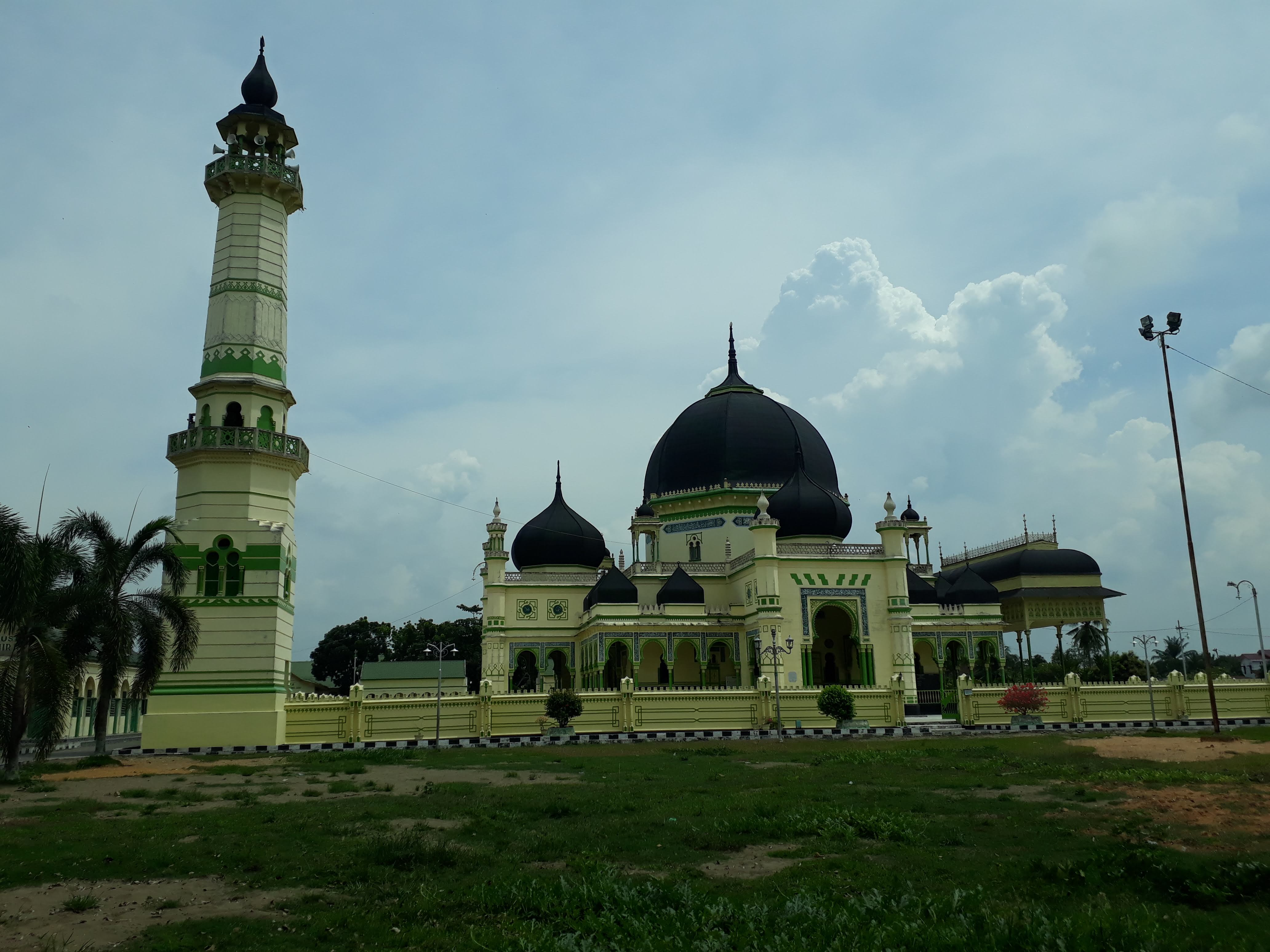
Azizi Mosque in Langkat, it was a royal mosque of the Sultanate of Langkat

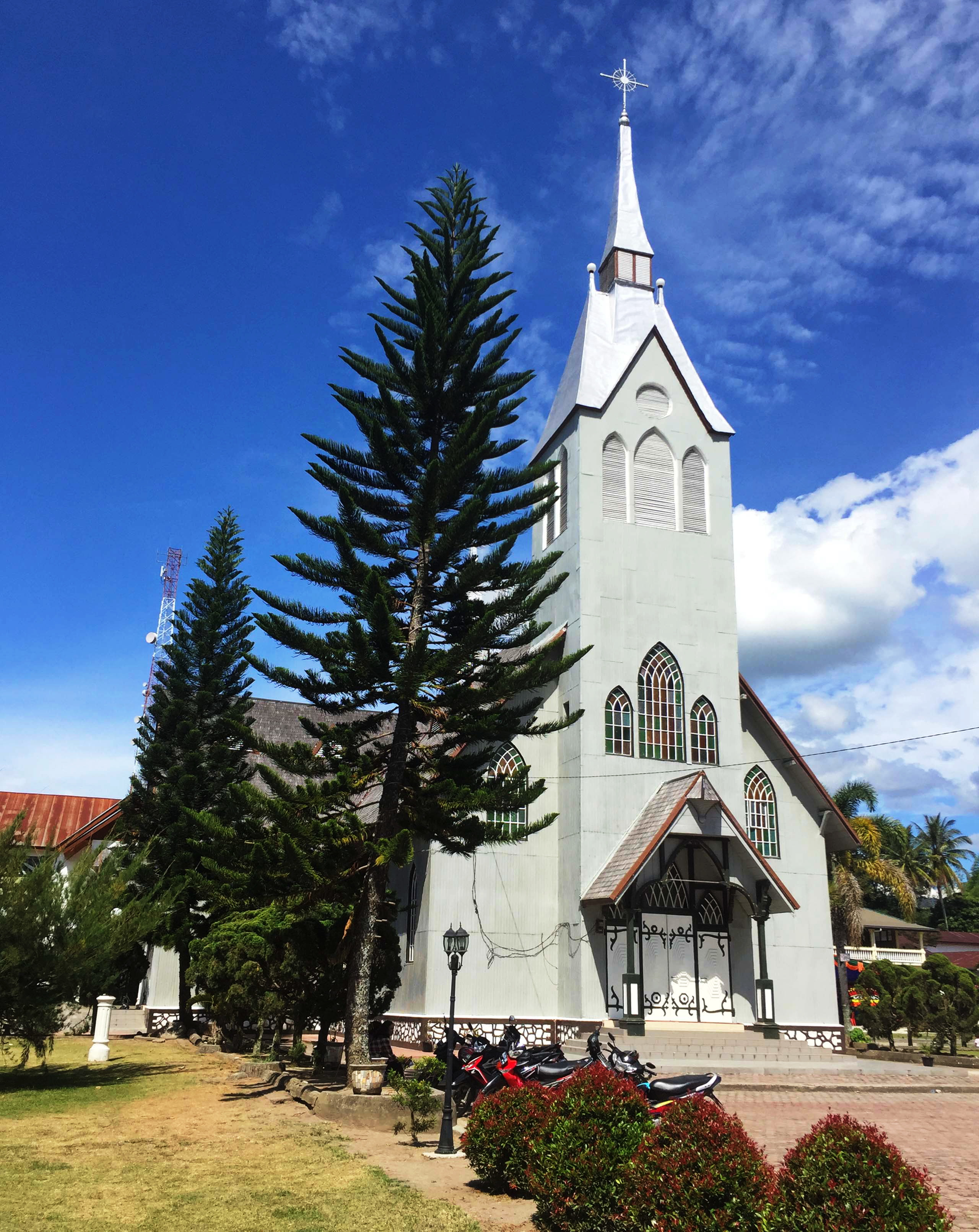
HKBP or Batak Protestant church in Balige

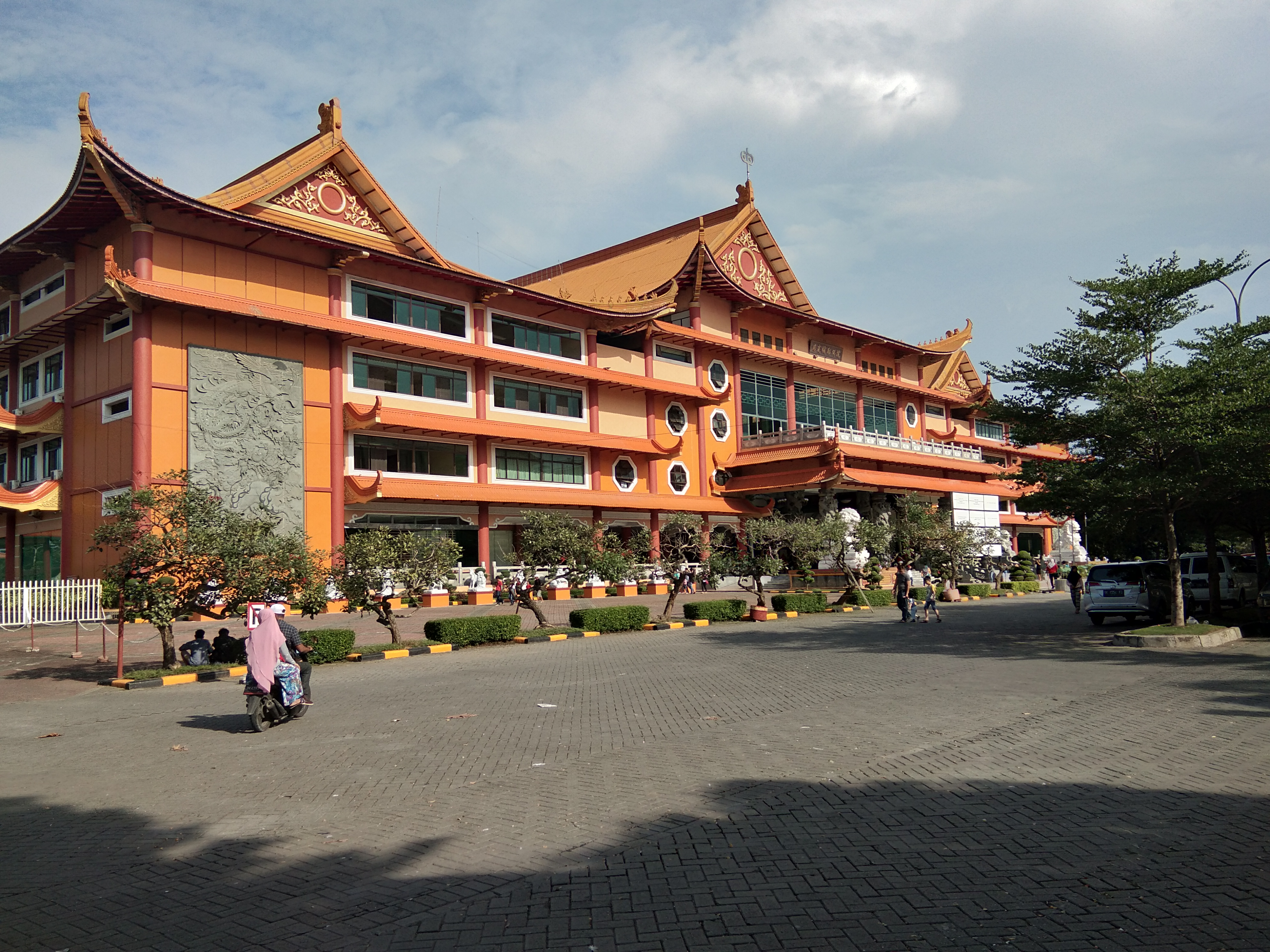
Maha Vihara Maitreya, one of the largest Buddhist temples in Indonesia, located in Percut, Deli Serdang

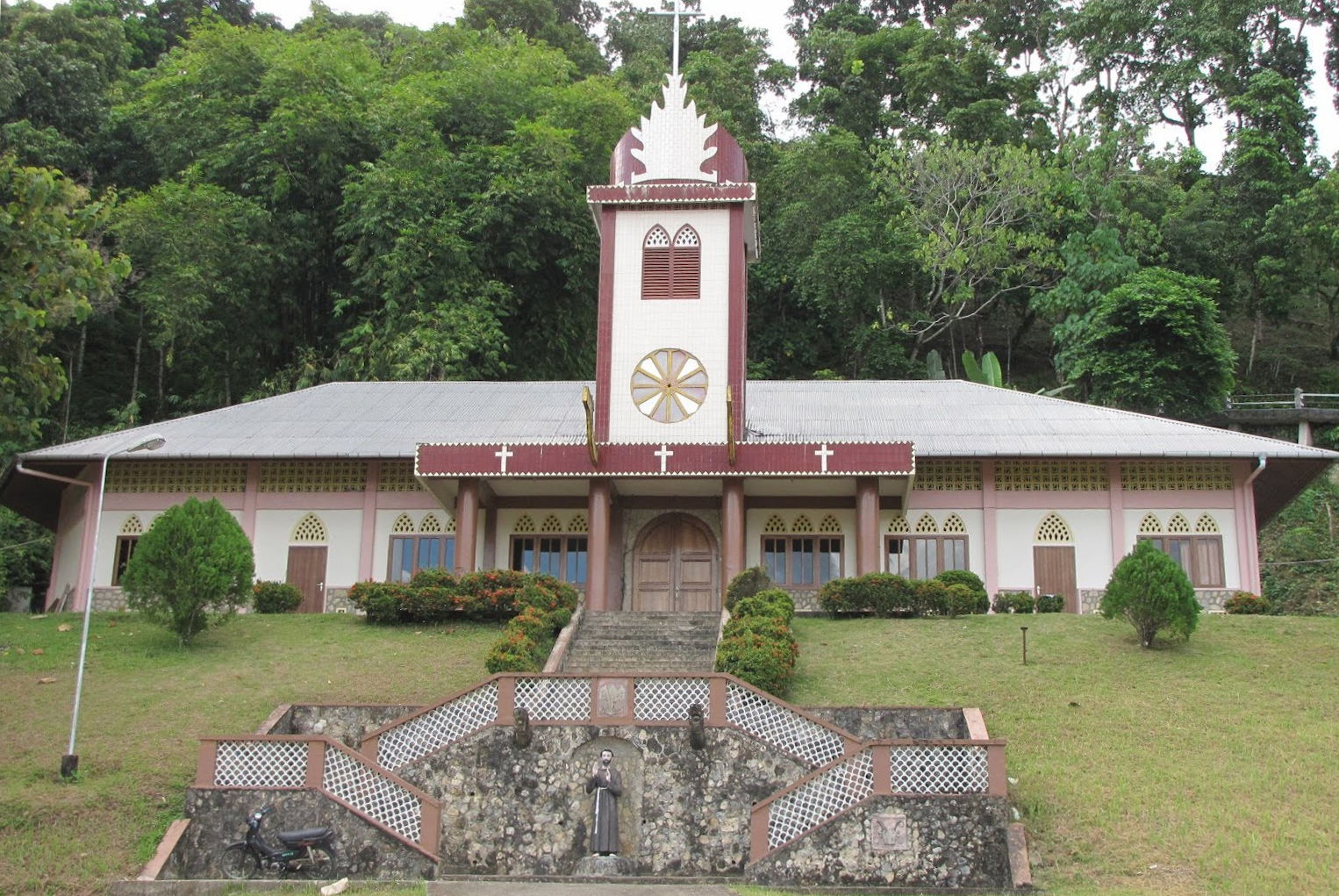
St Fransiskus Asisi Catholic church, Gunungsitoli, Nias

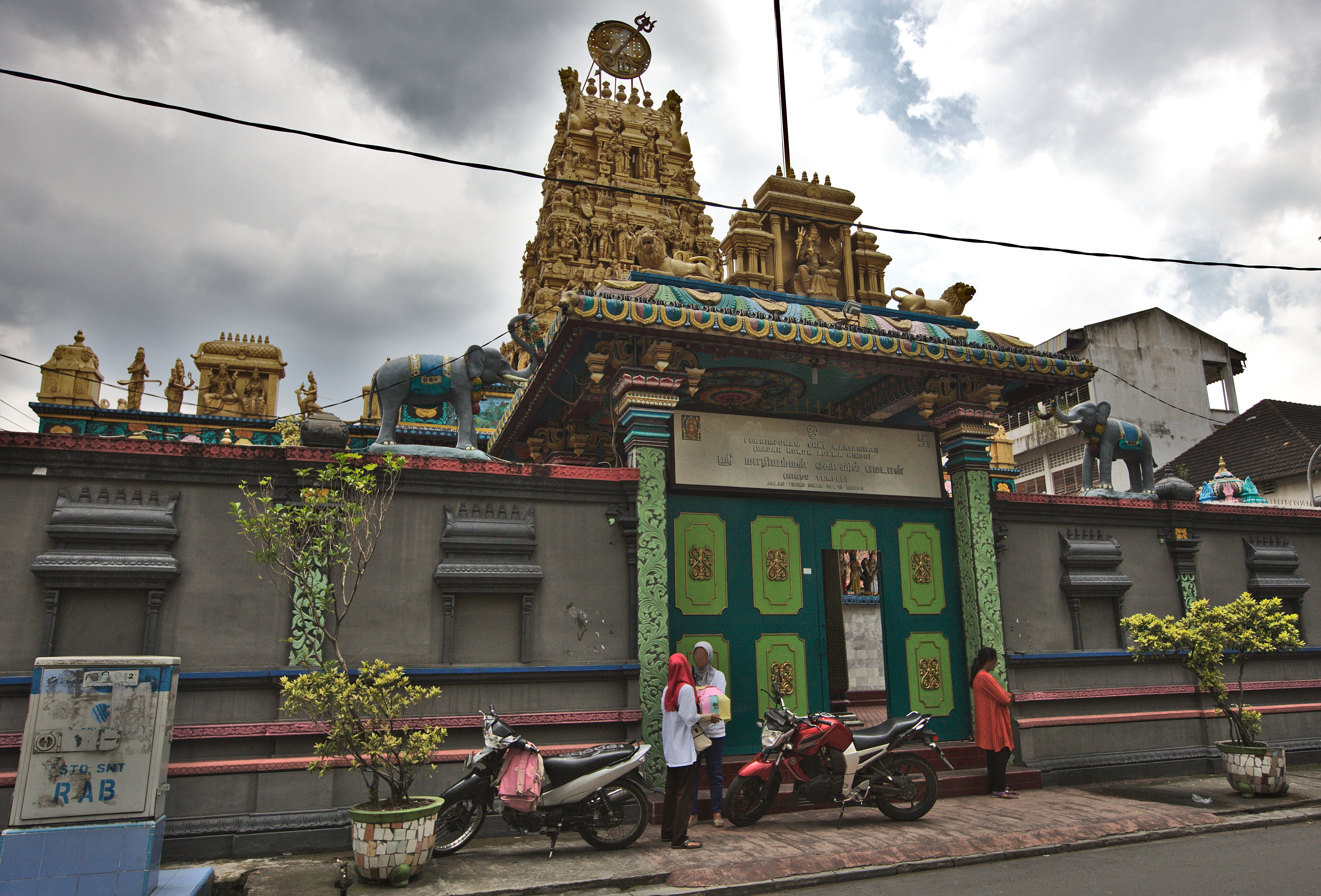
Sri Mariamman Temple, Medan, the oldest Hindu temple in Medan

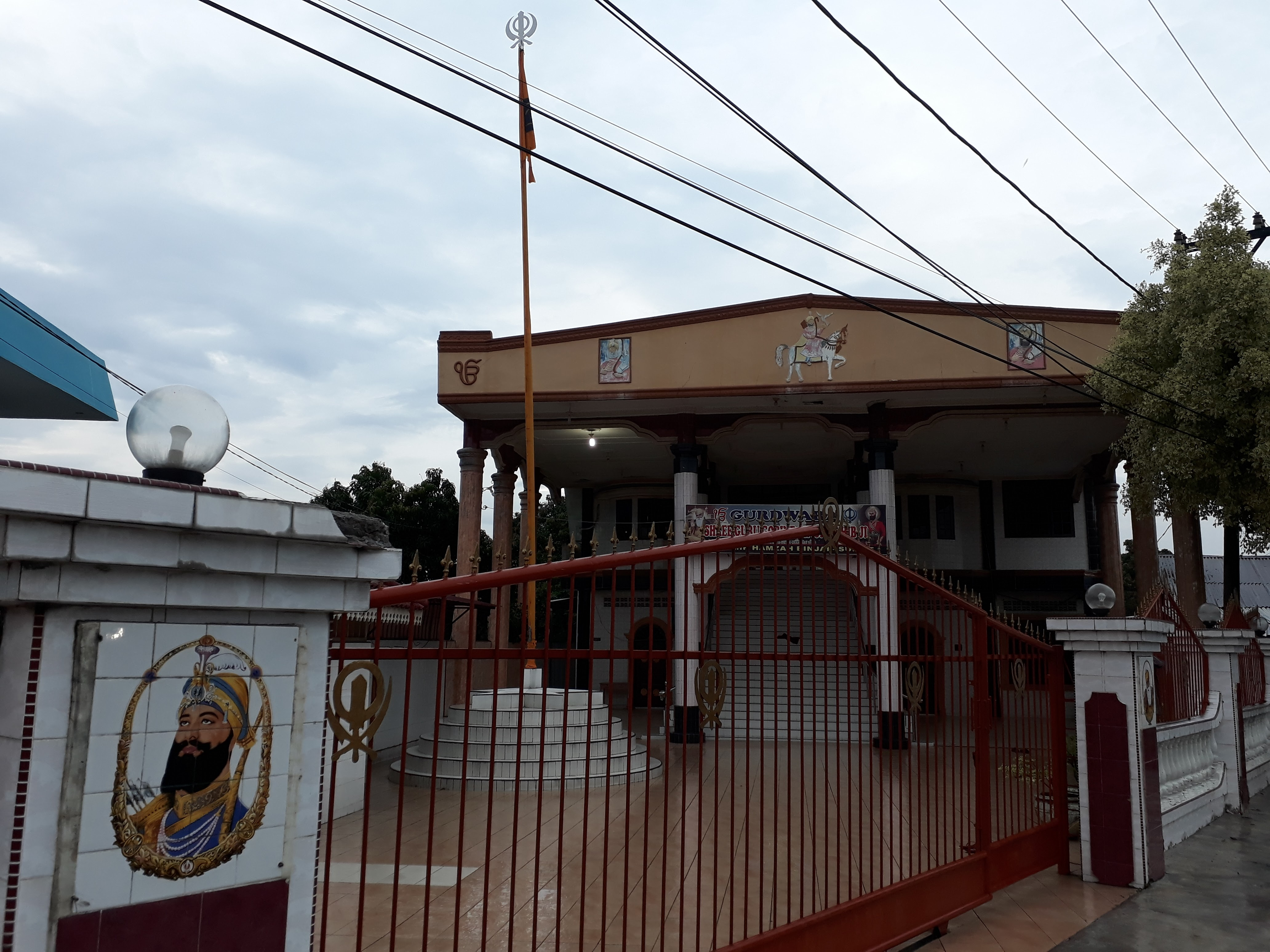
Shree Guru Gobind Singh Sahib Ji Sikh Gurdwara, Binjai

== Culture ==
North Sumatra hosts various ethnicities, religions and traditions, influenced by the Batak, Malay and Nias peoples, and other cultures such as Chinese, Indian and Javanese.

=== Music ===
The music that is usually played depends on the traditional ceremonies held, but is more dominant with the drums. As in the Coastal Ethnic (Indonesian: Orang Pesisir), there are musical instruments called Sikambang.

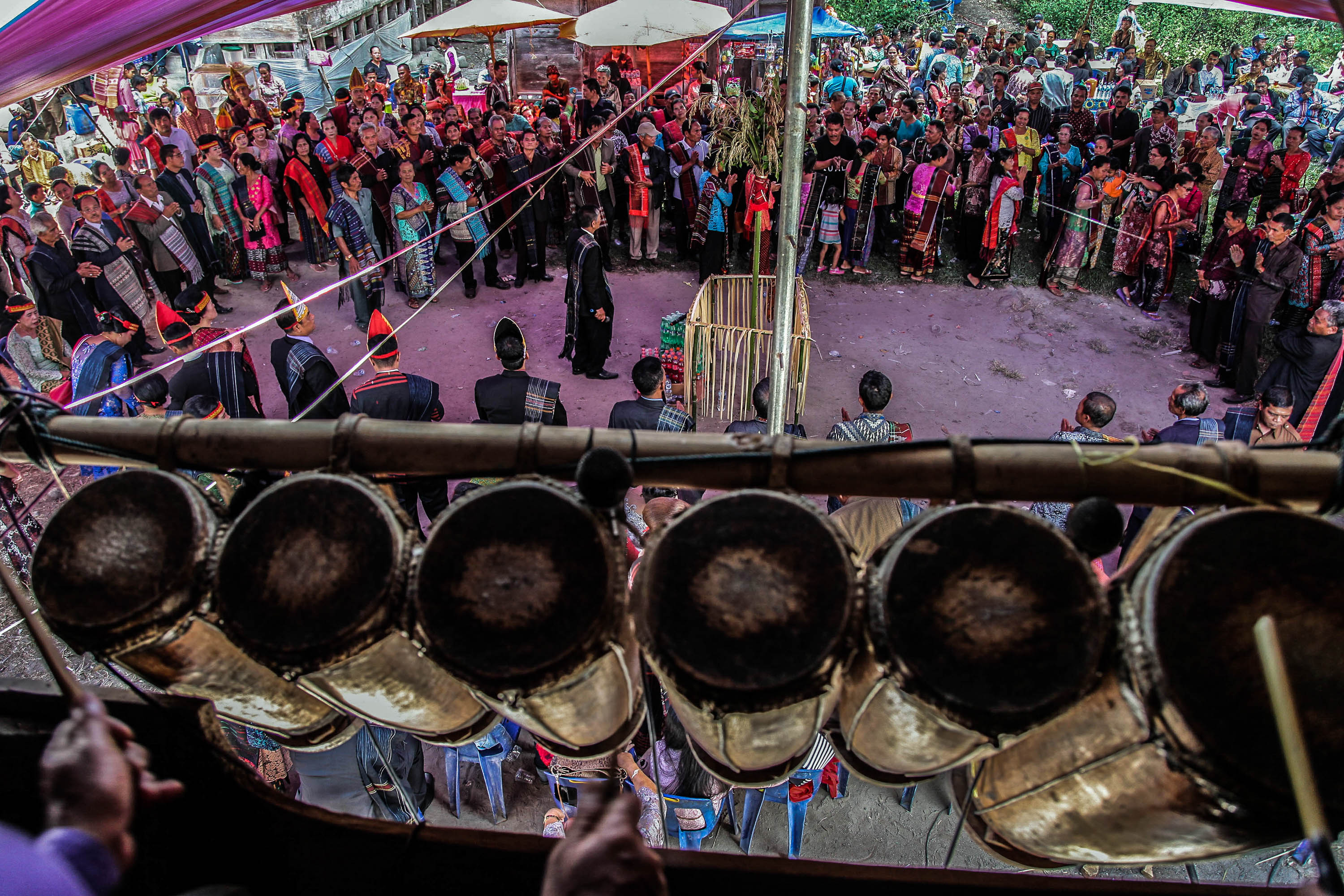
Bataknese Gondang percussion during a local ceremony in North Sumatra

The Batak Toba, Pakpak and Simalungun tribes have a musical instrument called Gondang which is usually played during traditional ceremonies in marriage, death, and so on. Meanwhile, the Mandailing and Angkola Batak tribes have musical instruments similar to the gondang, namely Gordang Sambilan. The Malays in the East Coast have the same musical instruments as the Malays in general, such as the accordion, the Malay drum (kompang) and the violin. Meanwhile, in Tanah Karo, there are the Kulcapi and Gendang musical instruments which are commonly used to accompany the Landek or Guro Guro Aron dance.

=== Architecture ===
In the field of fine arts, what stands out is the traditional house architecture which is a combination of the results of sculpture and carving as well as the results of handicrafts. Traditional house architecture is found in various forms of ornament. In general, the shape of the traditional house building in the Batak traditional group symbolizes a "buffalo standing upright" (Indonesian: Kerbau berdiri tegak). This is even clearer by decorating the top of the roof with buffalo heads.

The traditional house of the Batak Toba ethnic, Ruma Batak, is still commonly found in Samosir and Lake Toba area.The Batak Karo traditional house looks big and taller than other traditional houses. The roof is made of palm fiber and is usually supplemented with smaller triangular roofs called ayo-ayo rumah, Jambur and tersek. With multi-layered roofs, the Karo house has a distinctive shape compared to other traditional houses that only have one roof in North Sumatra; there are still several villages in Karo highland that still reserve traditional house and buildings, like in Lingga. The shape of the traditional house in the Batak Simalungun area is quite attractive. The traditional house complex in Pematang Purba village consists of several buildings, namely the Rumah Bolon, Balai Bolon, drying rack, taboo hall of need, and mortar. The prominent Mandailing buildings are called Bagas Gadang (house of Namora Natoras) and Sopo Godang (customary consultation hall).

Malay traditional houses in North Sumatra are not much different from Malay houses in other provinces, only the green and yellow colour is more dominant.

=== Dances ===
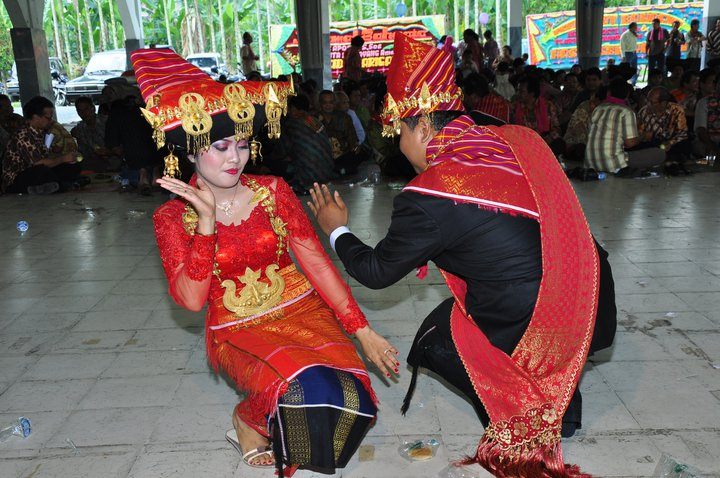
Batak-Karonese couple doing traditional dance called landek

The traditional dance repertoire includes various types. Some are in the form of sacred dances and some are solely for entertainment. In addition to traditional dances which are part of traditional ceremonies, sacred dances are usually danced by dayu-datu. Included in this type of dance are teacher dances and stick dances. Datu danced while swinging a magic stick called Tunggal Panaluan.

Profane dance is usually a young social dance that is danced at a happy party. Tortor is danced at the wedding ceremony. These are usually danced by the audience including the bride and young people. These youth dances, for example morah-morah, parakut, sipaj ok, patam-patam and kebangkiung. Magical dances, such as the Nasiraan Tortor Dance, Tunggal Panaluan Tor Tor Dance. This dance is usually performed with solemnity.

Besides Batak dances, there are also Malay dances such as Serampang XII, Gundala-Gundala and Landek dance from the Karo Highlands, Moyo and Maena dance from Nias.

=== Handicraft ===
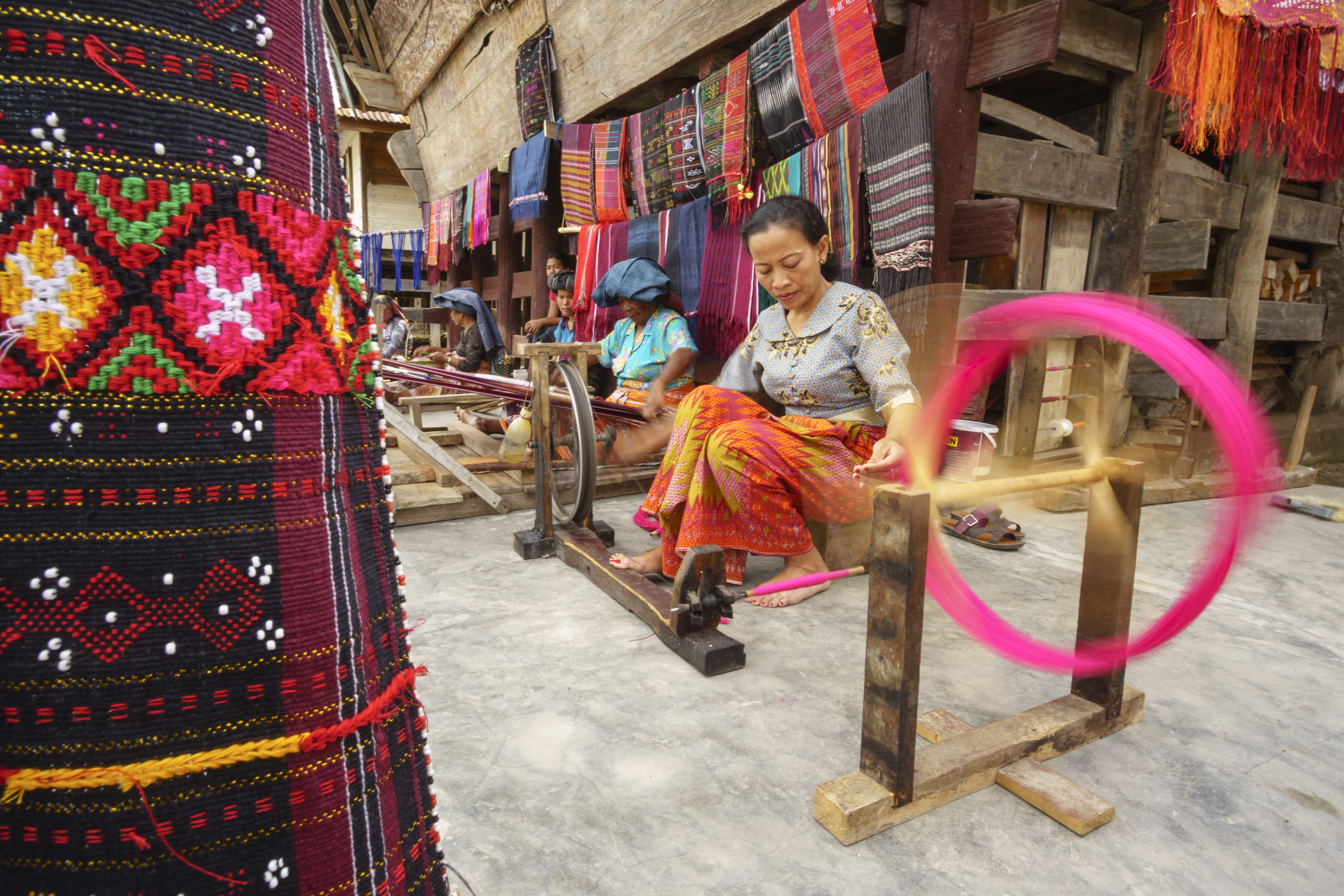
Local craftswomen weaving Ulos in Huta Raja village, Ulos is Bataknese traditional Tenun which is popular exported as garment from North Sumatra

In addition to architecture, weaving is another craft art from the Batak tribe. Examples of this weave are ulos cloth and songket cloth. Ulos is a traditional Batak cloth used in wedding ceremonies, death, building houses, arts, etc. Ulos cloth is made of cotton or hemp yarn. Ulos colors are usually black, white, and red which have certain meanings. In the Pakpak tribe there is a weave known as oles. Usually the base color of the ointment is black-brown or white. In the Karo tribe there is a weave known as uis. Usually uis base colors are dark blue and reddish. In the west coast community there is a woven fabric known as Songket Barus. The basic color of this craft is Dark Red or Yellow Gold.

Batubara Malay Songket is one of the typical crafts of the East Coast that has been worldwide. The process of making songket still uses wooden looms in the traditional way, but still has good quality, thus this songket is not inferior to songket produced with today's sophisticated machines. The Batubara songket also has a variety of unique motifs such as bamboo shoots, mangosteen flowers, cempaka flowers, Caul buds, Tolak Betikam, and Fighting Dragons. The Batubara songket woven has an attractive design and a high cultural artistic value.

=== Culinary ===
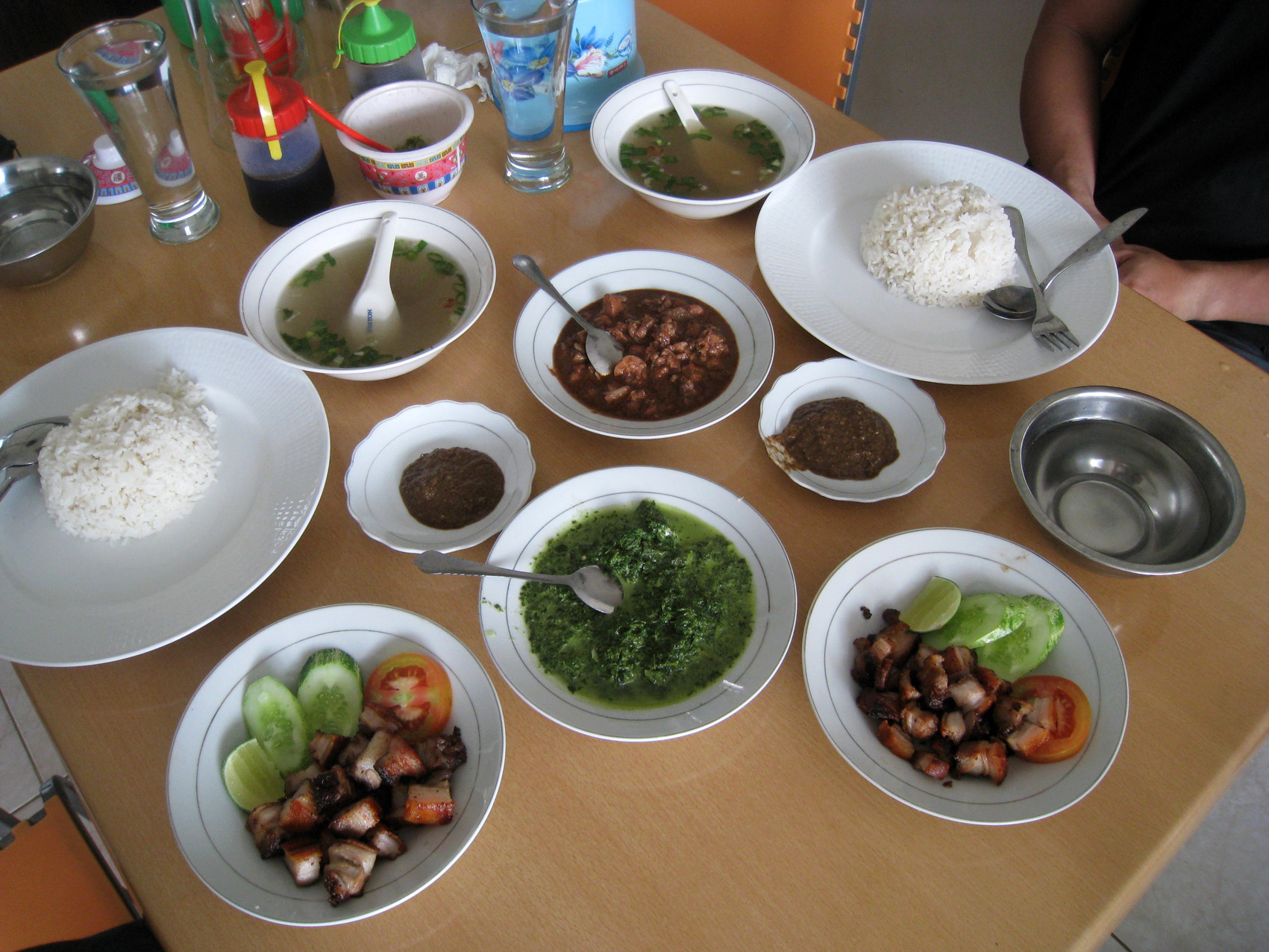
Bataknese cuisine such as Saksang, Babi panggang Karo and Sayur Daun ubi tumbuk

There is a wide variety of food in North Sumatra, depending on the region. This includes Saksang and Babi panggang karo, and in the Pakpak Dairi area, Pelleng is a very spicy popular typical food. The characteristic of Batak cuisine is its preference for andaliman (Zanthoxylum acanthopodium) as the main spice. That is why andaliman in Indonesia is sometimes dubbed as Batak pepper. In the Batak land itself there is dengke nani arsik which is fish that is fried without using coconut. Pasiyak Natonggi or money to buy sweet palm wine is a very familiar term there, describing how close palm wine or nira is to their lives. Batak people are majority Christian — unlike neighboring Muslim-majority ethnic groups such as Aceh and Minang — Christian Batak people are not restricted to Islamic halal dietary law.

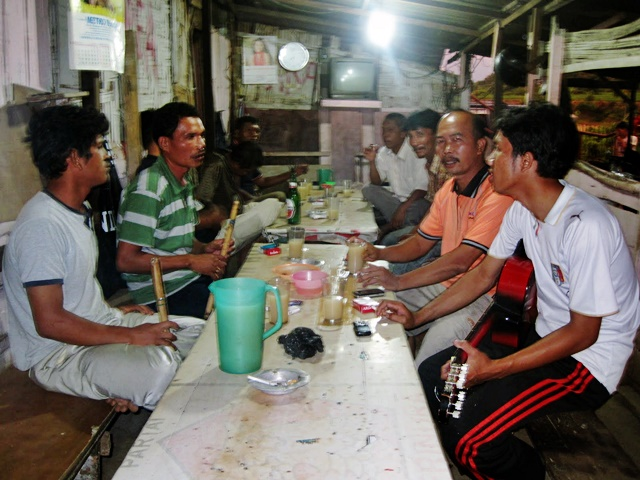
Lapo Tuak, Bataknese warung which served Tuak, an alcoholic palm wine

Many of the Batak popular meals contain pork as well as dishes made from unusual ingredients, such as dog meat or blood, however there are also halal batak dishes, mostly chicken, beef, lamb, mutton, and freshwater fishes. With a large population of Batak being Muslim, especially among Mandailing people, they have their own dishes such as Sayur daun ubi tumbuk or mashed-cassava leaf soup, Pora-pora, Salai ikan, Pakkat and others. Batak culinary centres are located in towns of Batak highlands, such as the town of Kabanjahe and Berastagi in Tanah Karo area. Some towns around the Lake Toba offer freshwater fish dishes such as carp arsik. The Northern Sumatra capital of Medan is also a Batak cuisine hotspot where numerous of Lapo (Batak restaurants) can be found anywhere across the province, it even expanded into neighbouring provinces such as Riau, Riau Islands, even capital Jakarta and neighbouring countries like in Malaysia and Singapore.

The North Sumatran Malay cuisine is similar to another Malay region, meals such as Nasi lemak (called as Nasi Gurih), Bubur pedas, Lemang and dodol are the most known dishes from Medan and the east coast. The Chinese have influenced the province's cuisine, examples are Cha Sio,Tau Kua He Ci, Popia, Bakpao, Teng-Teng, Chai Pao, Roti Kacang and Bika ambon which are dishes also popular elsewhere in Indonesia. Indian influences can also be seen in dishes such as Martabak, Roti canai, Putu bambu and Mie rebus. The Minangkabau and Acehnese peoples brought Nasi padang and Mie Aceh dishes.

== Economy ==
North Sumatra GDP share by sector (2022)
1. Agriculture (20.9%)
2. Manufacturing (20.0%)
3. Other industrial (15.4%)
4. Service (43.7%)

=== Energy ===
North Sumatra is rich in natural resources such as natural gas in the area of Tandem, Binjai and petroleum in Pangkalan Brandan, Langkat which has been explored since the days of the Dutch East Indies. Besides that, in Kuala Tanjung, Asahan, there is the company named PT Inalum (abbreviated from Indonesia Aluminium) that is engaged in ore mining and smelting of aluminium which is the only one in Southeast Asia.

The rivers that disgorge from the mountains around Lake Toba are also a natural resource that has enough potential to become an exploited resource for hydroelectric power plants. Asahan hydropower, which is the largest hydroelectric power plant on Sumatra Island, is located at Porsea in Toba Samosir Regency.

Moreover, in the mountains there are many geothermal hot spots which are very likely to be developed as a source of thermal energy or steam that can then be transformed into electrical energy.

=== Agriculture and farming ===
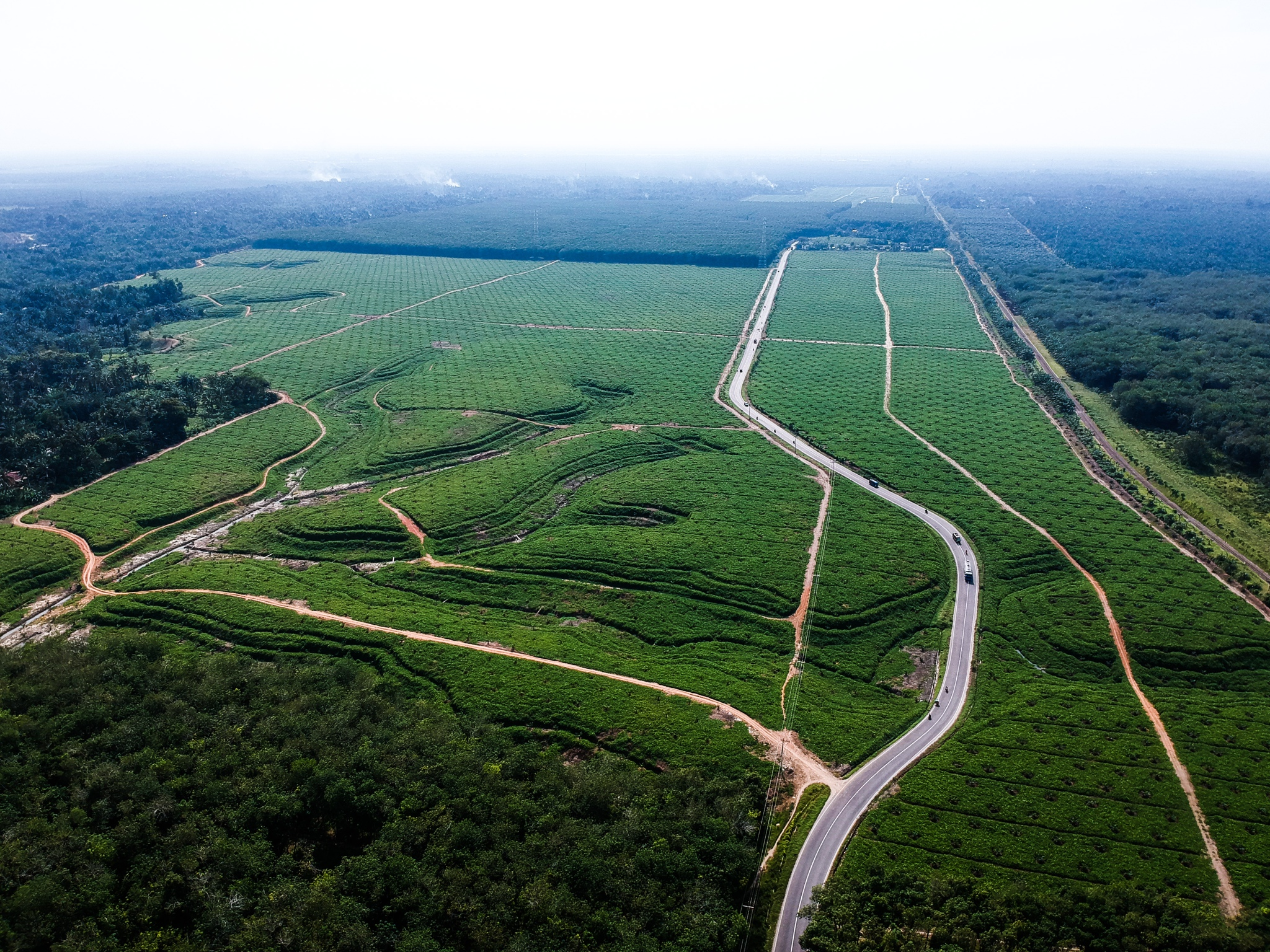
Birdview of Palm Oil Estate of Asahan Regency

The province is famous for its plantations. The plantations are managed by private companies and the state. SOE Plantation area is located in North Sumatra, among others PT Perkebunan Nusantara II (PTPN II), PTPN IV and PTPN III.

North Sumatra produces rubber, cocoa, tea, palm oil, coffee, cloves, coconut, cinnamon, and tobacco. These commodities have been exported to many countries and contribute a large part to the foreign exchange for Indonesia. In addition to commodities, North Sumatra is also known as a producer of horticultural commodities (vegetables and fruits); e.g. Medanese Orange, Deli Guava, Cabbage Vegetable, Tomato, Potato and Carrot generated by Karo, Simalungun and North Tapanuli. The horticultural products have been exported to Malaysia and Singapore.

The plantation is spread in East coast area such as Deli Serdang, Serdang Bedagai Langkat, Simalungun, Asahan, Labuhan Batu, and also around west coast: Central and South Tapanuli. Plantations, especially palm oil, are important for sourcing reticulated and blood pythons, the skins of which are a major export product.

The size of technical irrigation entirely in North Sumatra is 132 ha that covers an area of 174 irrigation site.

Sumatra Mandheling and Sumatra Lintong coffee beans are grown in North Sumatra and largely exported to the United States. Mandheling is named after the similarly spelt Mandailing people located in North Sumatra, Indonesia. The name is the result of a misunderstanding by the first foreign purchaser of the variety, and no coffee is actually produced in the "Mandailing region". Lintong on the other hand, is named after the Lintong district, also located in North Sumatra.

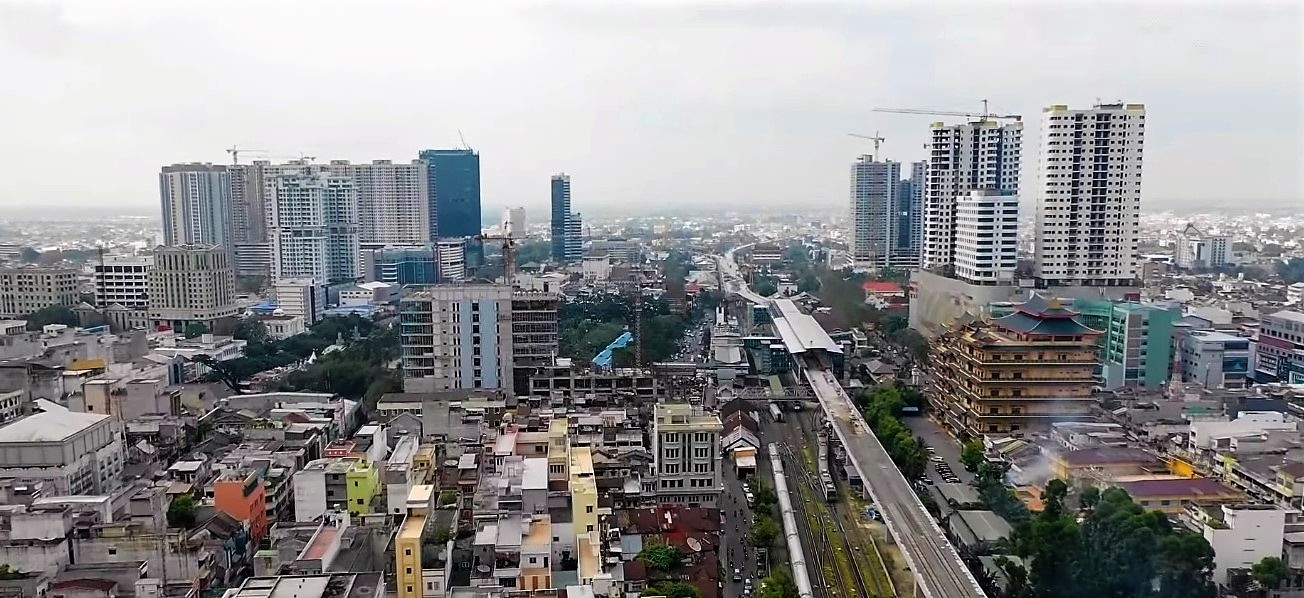
Skyline of capital Medan city

=== Banking ===
In addition to national banks, state banks and international banks, currently there are 61 units of Credited Peoples Banks (BPR) and 7 Credited Sharia Bank (BPRS). Data from Bank Indonesia showed, in January 2006, the Third Party Funds (TPF), which absorbed BPR reached Rp253,366,627,000 (around US$19 million) and loans reached Rp260.152.445.000 (around US$19.5 million). Assets reached Rp340,880,837,000 (US$25.5 million).

=== Mining ===
There are three leading mining companies in North Sumatra:

- Sorikmas Mining (SMM), main base around South Tapanuli with gold as main commodity
- Newmont Horas Nauli (PTNN)
- Dairi Prima Mineral

=== Industry ===
North Sumatra has several industrial sites, mainly around Deli Serdang. Medan Industrial Area (Indonesian: Kawasan Industri Medan) stands for KIM is the main industrial complex in Medan.

==== Sei Mangkei Industrial Area ====
Sei Mangkei Industrial Area, also known as Sei Mangkei – Integrated Sustainable Palm Oil Cluster (SM-ISPOIC), is located in Simalungun Regency and was formally opened on 12 June 2010. Four companies have joined in this area, with investment costs totaling up to Rp1.5 trillion ($176 million). In April 2011, three other companies also joined in the Sei Mangkei area. They are Procter & Gamble for making CPO derivatives of cosmetic raw materials, Ferrostaal AG and Fratelli Gianazza SpA.

=== Exports and imports ===
The increasingly higher economic performance of Sumatra and Java means that North Sumatran exports will be experiencing rapid growth. In 2004, the size of the foreign exchange sector had reached $4.24 billion, up 57.7% from 2003.

Coffee exports from North Sumatra reached a record high of 46,290 tonnes with Japan as the main export destination countries during the last five years. Sumatran coffee exports are also listed as the top 10 highest export products with a value of US$3.25 million or 47200.8 tons from January to October 2005.

Of the garment sector, garment exports tend to fall in January 2006. The results of special apparel industry down 42.59% from US$1,066,124 in 2005, to US$2,053 in 2006 in the same month.

Import export performance of some industrial products showed a decline. Namely furniture fell 22.83% from US$558,363 (2005) to US$202,630 (2006), plywood down 24.07 percent from US$19,771 to US$8,237, misteric acid down 27.89% from US$115,362 into US$291,201, stearic acid dropped 27.04% from US$792,910 to US$308,020, and soap noodles down 26% from US$689,025 to US$248,053.

Export performance of agricultural imports also decreased, with the essential oil dropping 18 percent from US$162,234 to US$773,023, seafood / shrimp, coconut oil and robusta coffee also dropping by 97 per cent. Some commodities increased (a value of over US $ Million) such as cocoa, horticulture, arabica coffee, palm oil, natural rubber, seafood (non-shrimp).

=== Tourism ===
North Sumatra has lots of travel destinations. According to Ministry of Tourism, North Sumatra is ranked amongst the top 10 most visited province in Indonesia. There are various kinds of tourist destinations that could be found throughout the province, Berastagi is best known as a hilly place with a cooler temperature as the whole province is in tropical region. Lake Toba is also a popular travel destination. Toba is a large volcanic lake which has an island inside of it, Samosir Island. Nias Island and several other islands nearby named Batu Islands are a popular spot for surfing. The capital itself, Medan, has many places of interest, mainly for its historical sites. The city is also known for its variety of cuisine. The list below is the most known places of interest in North Sumatra:

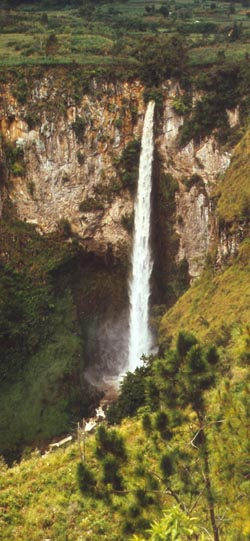
Sipisopiso waterfall, Tongging

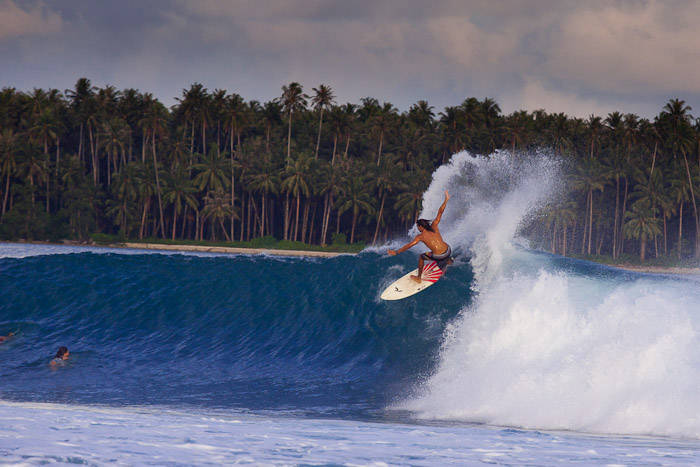
Surfing in Tello Island, Nias

- Medan is the capital of North Sumatra province with a diverse crowd population of tribes and religions in unity. There are many historical tourist monuments to spot and various great cuisines to taste in Medan.
- Lake Toba is the largest volcanic lake in the world. Located in the centre of North Sumatra, the lake can be reached via Parapat (Simalungun regency), Tongging (Karo regency), and Balige (Toba Samosir regency).
- Samosir Island is a volcanic island in middle of Lake Toba, It is a popular tourist destination due to its exotic Batak history and the vistas it offers. The tourist resorts are concentrated in the Tuktuk, Tomok, Simanindo, and Pangururan areas.
- Bukit Lawang known for the largest animal sanctuary of Sumatran orangutan (around 5,000 orangutans occupy the area), and also the main access point to the Gunung Leuser National Park from the east side.
- Nias Island is an island off the western coast of Sumatra. Nias is an internationally popular surfing destination where many international surfing competitions are held. The best-known surfing area is Sorake Bay, close to the town of Teluk Dalam, on the southern tip. This is enclosed by the beaches of Lagundri and Sorake. Tourists can visit the island by plane from Medan, or by ferry from Sibolga.
- Bawomataluo village is a settlement in Teluk Dalam of the South Nias Regency of Indonesia. The village was built on a flat-topped hill, the name Bawomataluo meaning "Sun Hill", and is one of the best-preserved villages built in the traditional style.
- Berastagi is a small highland town located 63 kilometres to the south of Medan and is a popular weekend destination for city dwellers due to its chilled and fresh mountain air.
- Dolok Tinggi Raja has a unique soil colour which is white because it is located in a limestone hill that resembles snow, and also in the middle of this area there are lakes with hot blue green coloured water, located in Tinggi Raja, Simalungun.
- Lumbini Natural Park is a Buddhist Theravada-style temple that is similar to Shwedagon Pagoda in Myanmar located in Berastagi.
- Kolam Abadi Pelaruga, a blue crystal river located in Rumah Galuh, Langkat Regency, 50 km from Medan
- Poncan Island is a resort including a beach, located on west offshore of Sibolga city.
- Berhala Island is a 2.5 hectares island located in the Malaka Strait near the boundary of Indonesia and Malaysia. It is a popular place for snorkeling and watching turtle nesting. Visitors can reach the island via boat from Sergei in the Serdang Bedagai regency.
- Sipisopiso, one of the highest waterfalls in Indonesia, is located near Tongging in Karo regency, about 1 hour drive from Berastagi.
- Simalem Resort, is a 5 star resort located around 8 km from Munthe village, Karo Regency. This place is a good place for viewing the whole Lake Toba from top of the hill.
- Taman Iman, Indonesian name for The Garden of Faith located in Sitinjo village, Dairi around 10 km away from Sidikalang, it is a religious garden with dioramas from 5 religion of Indonesia (Islam, Christian, Buddhist, Hindu, and Confucian).

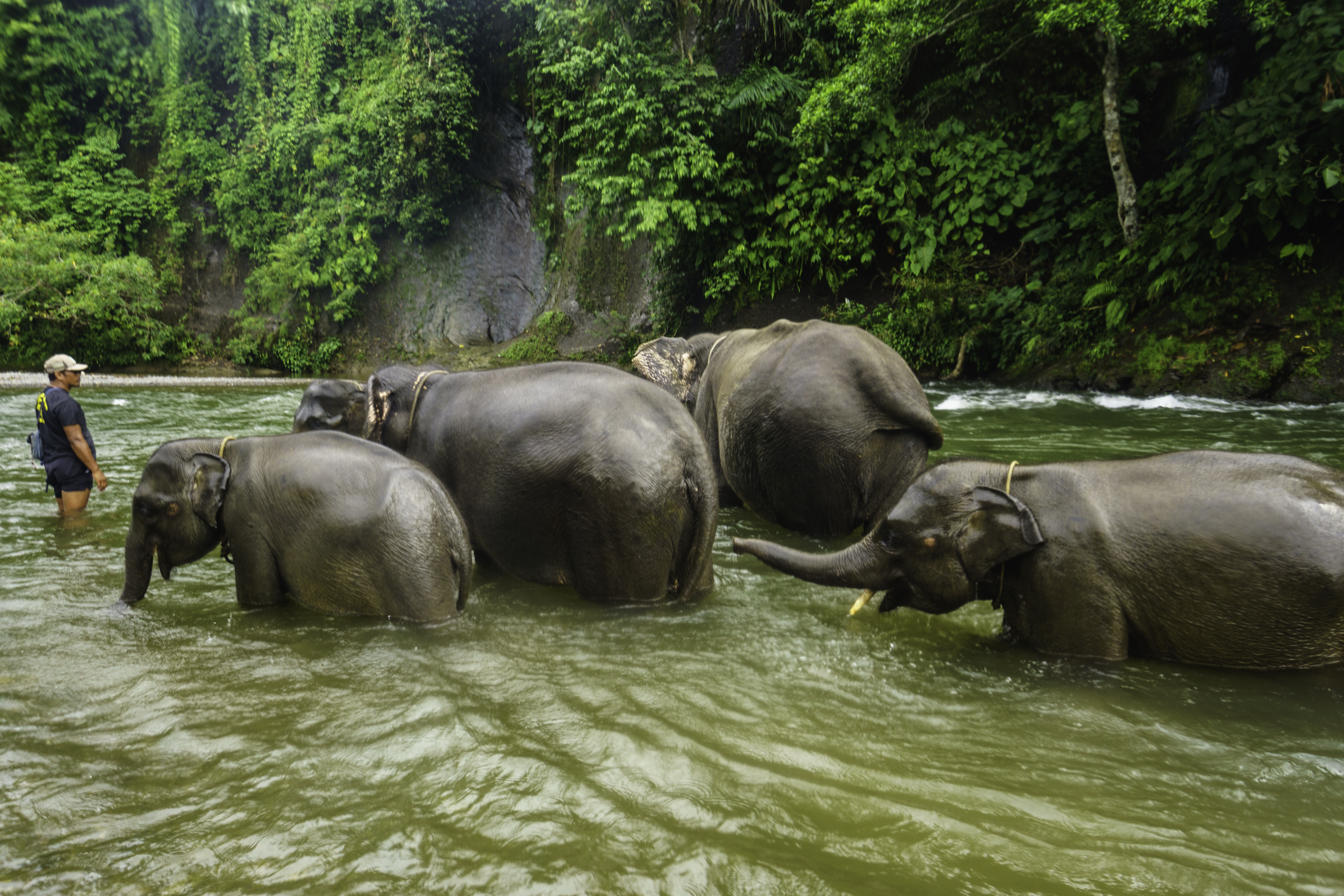
Elephant conservation area at Tangkahan Ecotourism Area in Mount Leuser National Park, North Sumatra

- Bahal temple, an ancient Buddhist monastery located in Padang Bolak, Padang Lawas Regency, around a 3-hour journey by car from Padang Sidempuan. The temple is believed to have been constructed between the 11th and 13th centuries AD.
- Sigura-Gura Waterfall located in Porsea, Toba Samosir Regency, this is a waterfall that has a height that reaches 250 metres.
- Rahmat International Wildlife Museum and Gallery, is a natural history museum in Medan. The museum displays various taxidermy collections of wildlife from the smallest to the largest according to the habitat.

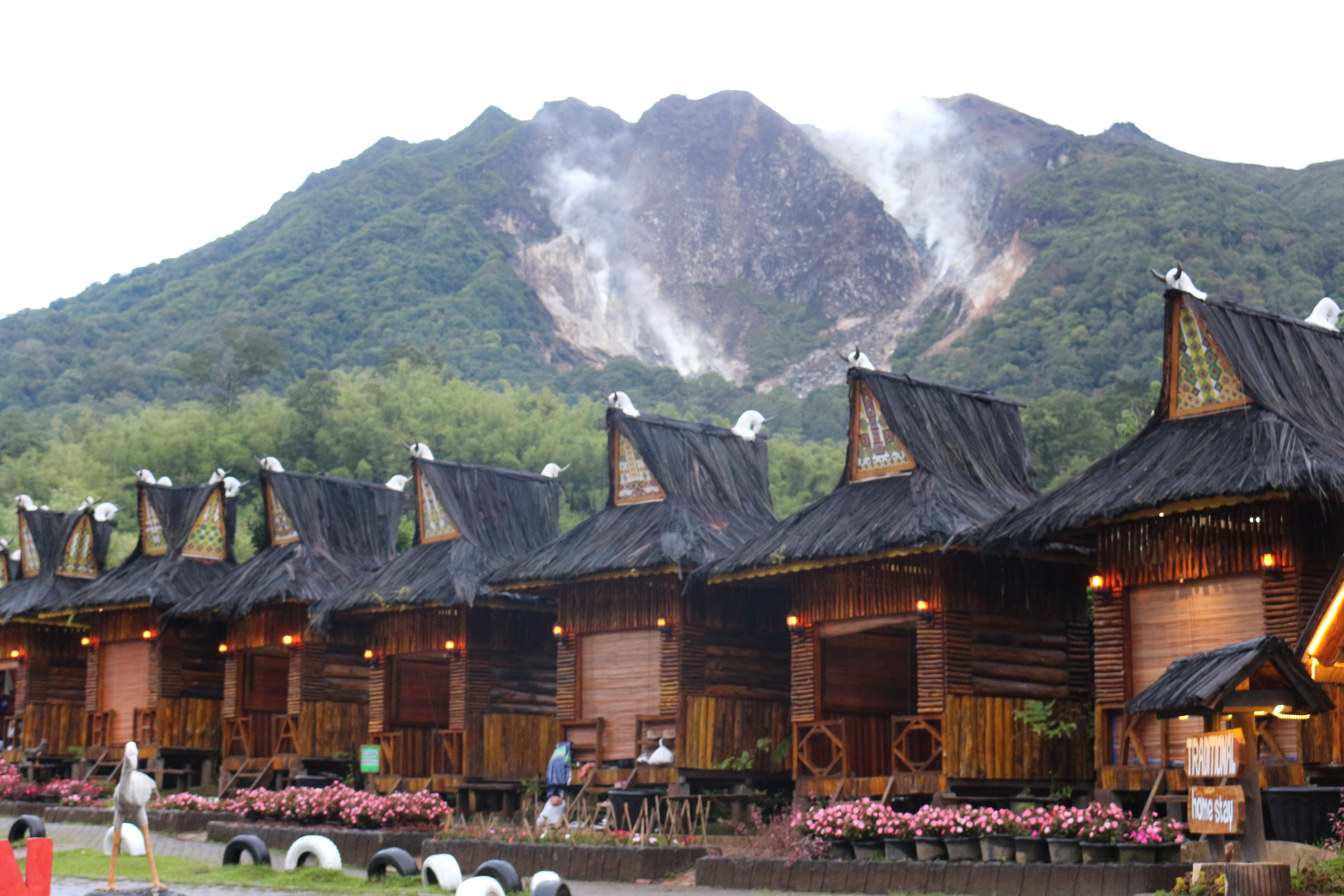
Pariban Hotsprings in Lau Sidebuk-debuk village, Karo Highlands

- Tangkahan is a tourist site situated at the edge of the Gunung Leuser national park, around 20 km due north from Bukit Lawang, The main tourist draw at Tangkahan is the presence of Sumatran elephant.
- Salib Kasih, Indonesian name for Love Cross, located in Tarutung. The development objective of this cross-shaped monument is to commemorate the service and dedication of Ludwig Ingwer Nommensen which is a missionary from northern Germany. This Parks built on Dolok (Hill) Siatas Barita.
- Lingga is one of the village in the Karo Regency. Located at an altitude of about 1200 m above sea level, approximately 15 km from Brastagi and 5 km from the Kabanjahe. Linga is unique Karo traditional house and village that has been built an estimated 250 years ago, but still sturdy.
- Tanjungbalai is an old city situated approximately 180 km from Medan, the capital city of North Sumatra. In fact, it holds the last train station from the capital city. There is some sections of this town that still bears historical building established in the Dutch colonial.

== Transportation ==
=== Airports ===
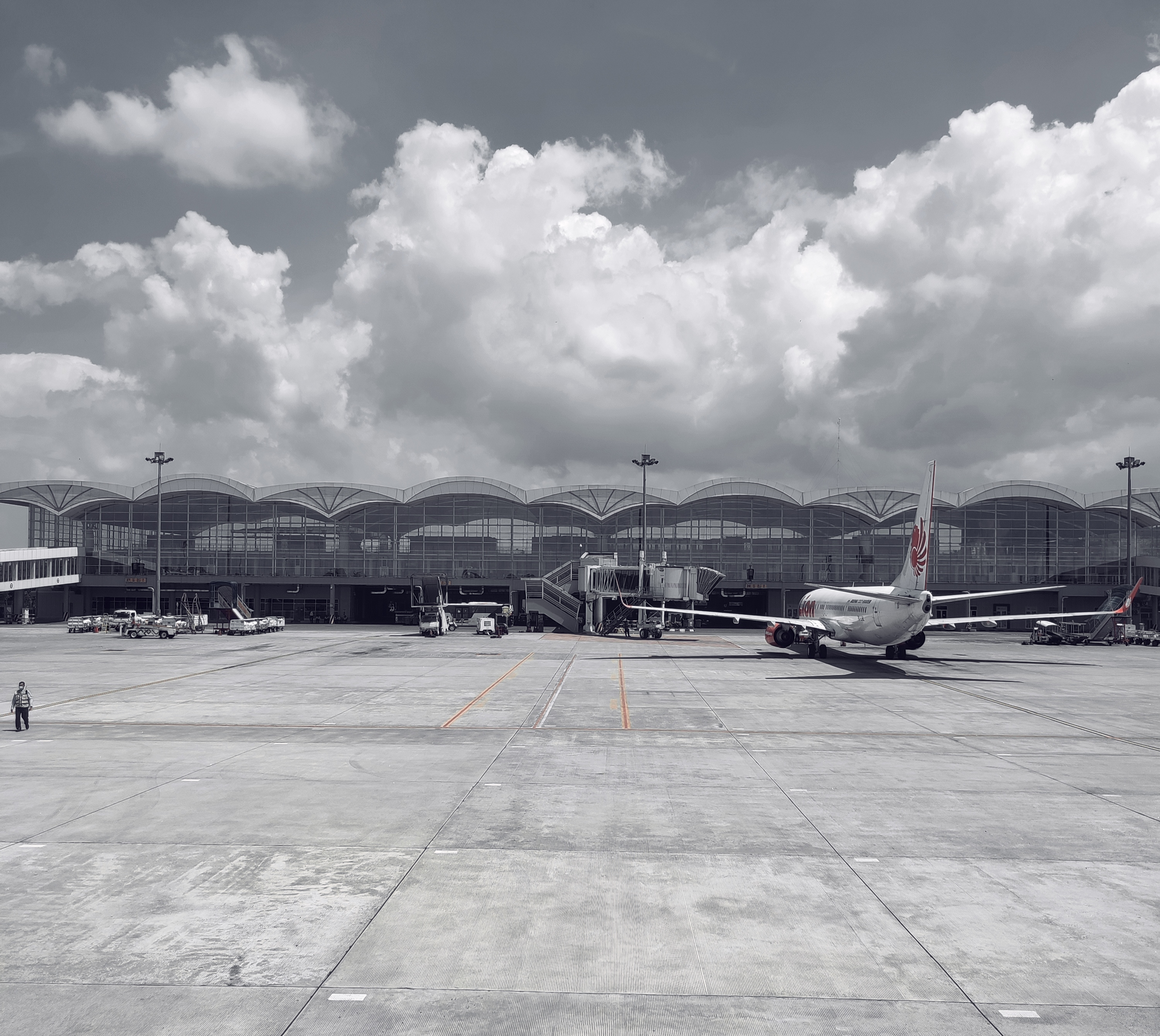
Exterior of Kualanamu International Airport, Deli Serdang

The modern Kualanamu International Airport was opened on July 25, 2013, and is located almost 40 kilometres from Medan. The airport replaces the old Polonia International Airport. It serves flights to several Indonesian and Malaysian cities, along with flights to Singapore, Thailand, Hong Kong, and Saudi Arabia. In passenger numbers, Kualanamu is the fifth largest airport in Indonesia.

Other airports in North Sumatra are:

- Lasondre Airport in Batu Islands
- Binaka Airport in Gunung Sitoli, Nias Island
- Aek Godang Airport in Padang Sidempuan, South Tapanuli Regency
- Sibisa Airport in Ajibata, Toba Samosir Regency
- Ferdinand Lumban Tobing Airport or Pinangsori Airport in Sibolga, Centra Tapanuli Regency
- Silangit Airport, in Siborong-Borong

=== Seaports ===
North Sumatra has an international seaport at Belawan, near Medan and is now preparing to have a new seaport at Kuala Tanjung, in Batubara Regency, for about Rp1 trillion ($114 million).

=== Road ===
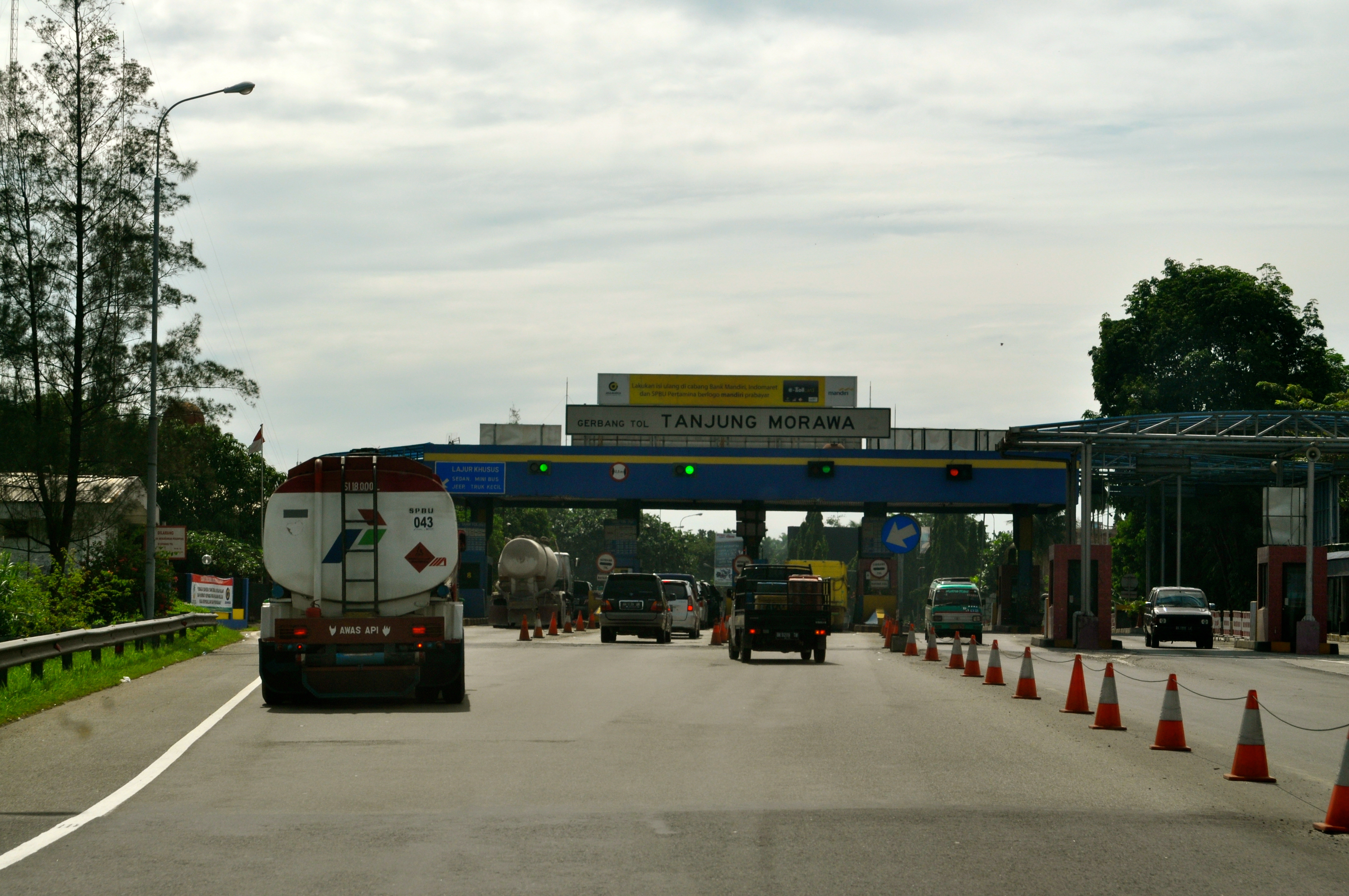
Tanjung Morawa toll gate, in Deli Serdang, part of Belmera toll road

In North Sumatra, there is 2098.05 kilometres down a state-road, which pertained only steady 1095.70 kilometres or 52.22 percent and 418.60 kilometres or 19.95 percent in a state of being, remaining in a state of disrepair. While of 2752.41 kilometres of provincial roads, which is in a state of steady length 1237.60 kilometres or 44.96 per cent, while in a state of being 558.46 kilometres, or 20.29 percent. As damaged roads length 410.40 kilometres, or 14.91 percent, and the damaged length 545.95 kilometres, or 19.84 percent.

There is a 28 km toll road (expressway) in named as Belmera Toll Road, the first toll road in Medan, connecting from Belawan to Tanjung Morawa, passing east side of the city, the government has also built a 62 km Medan–Kualanamu–Tebing Tinggi Toll Road and 17 km Medan–Binjai Toll Road. A project to build toll road from Tebing Tinggi to Parapat and also from Tebing Tinggi to Kisaran and Kisaran to Rantauprapat down south to Bagan Batu, Riau also in proportion, meanwhile in the north, a toll project connecting Binjai to Aceh's eastern city, Langsa and up to Banda Aceh are also on going. There are under discussion to build Medan inner ring-road toll road, including an elevated tollway above Deli River to accelerate city traffic.

=== Rail ===
Regional Division I North Sumatra and Aceh or Divre I is regional railway from Aceh to North Sumatra operated by Kereta Api Indonesia, but only in-operation railway are from Binjai to Medan (Sri Lelawangsa), Medan to Pematangsiantar (Siantar Express), Medan to Tanjung Balai (Putri Deli) and Medan to Rantau Prapat (Sribilah); there is an under construction rail way to Banda Aceh in Aceh province also to Pekanbaru, Riau province. Medan also has its first airport rail link in Indonesia, called Kualanamu Airport Rail Link. It connects the city to Kualanamu Airport.

== See also ==
- List of people from North Sumatra
