= Tengku Mansur =

Indonesian politician

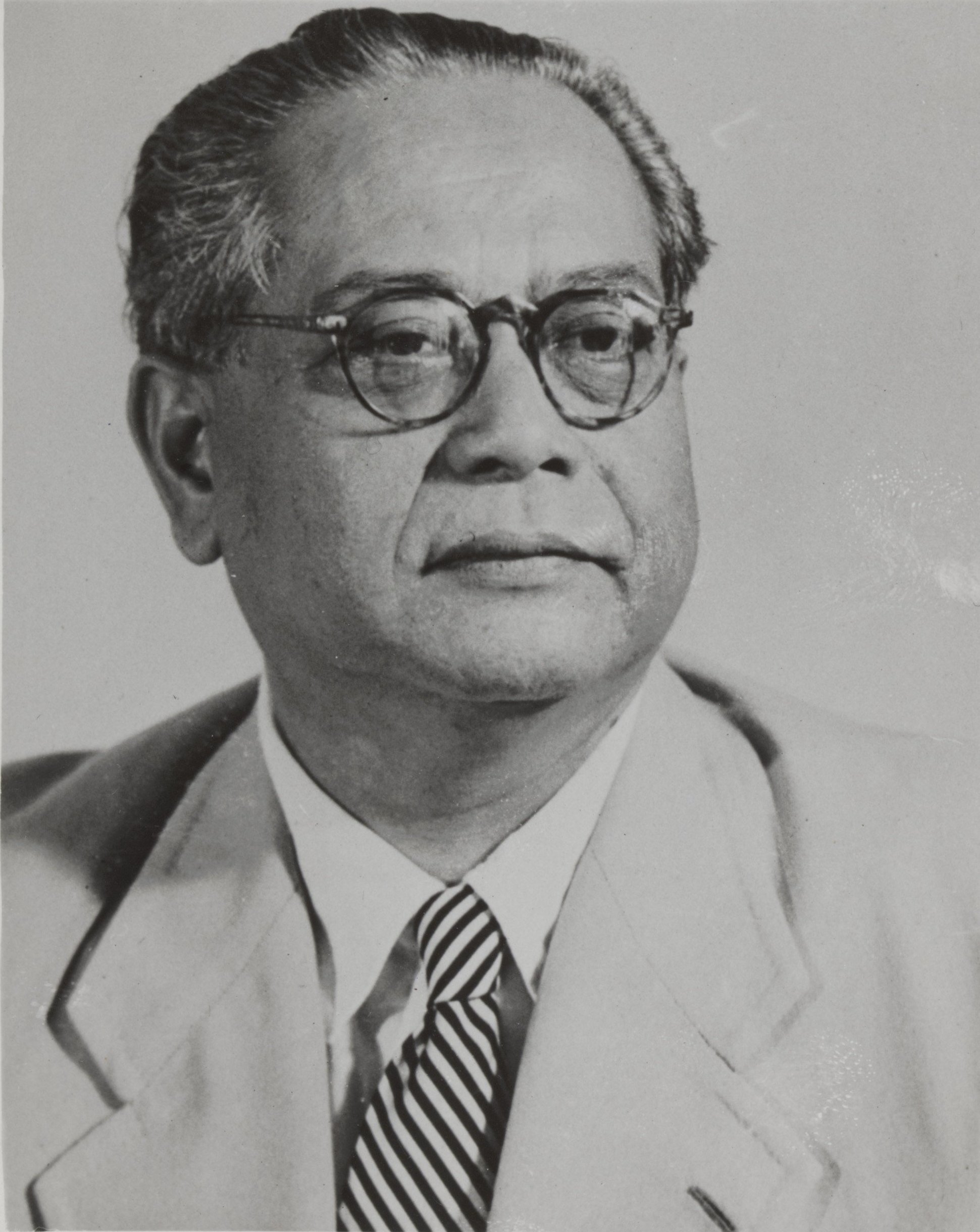

Wali Negara of Sumatera Timur
- In office 28 January 1948 – 17 August 1950
- President: Sukarno
- Preceded by: Position created
- Succeeded by: Position abolished

Personal details
- Born: 17 January 1897 Tanjungbalai, Sultanate of Asahan, Dutch East Indies
- Died: 10 October 1955 (Age 58) Medan, North Sumatra, Indonesia
- Children: 2
- Education: STOVIA; Leiden University

Tengku Mansur or Tengku Mansoer (1897–1955) was a Malay nationalist and the only Wali Negara (head of state) of East Sumatra, part of the United States of Indonesia.

== Early life and pre-war career ==
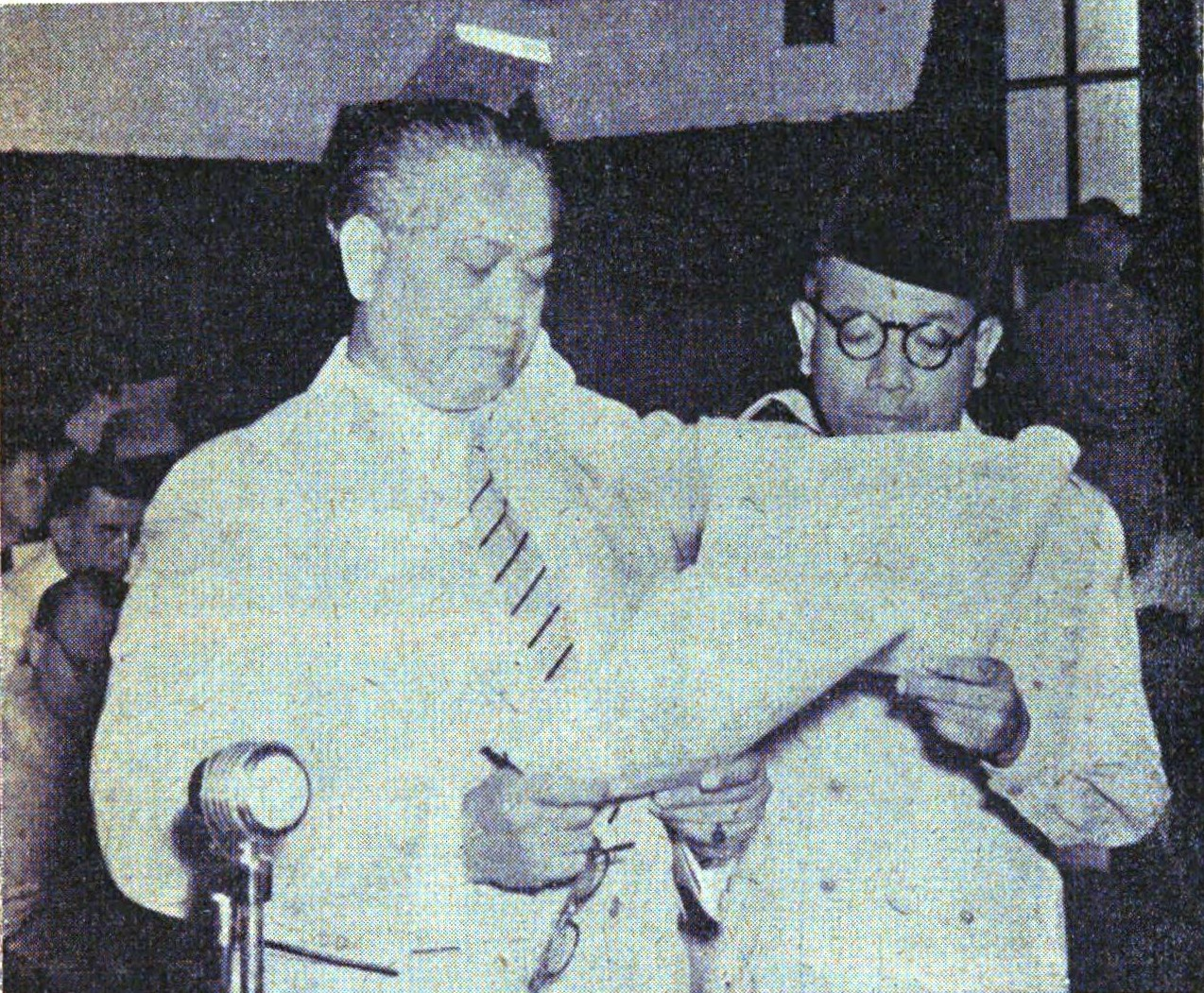
Inauguration of Tengku Mansur as Wali Negara of East Sumatra

Mansur was a member of the Asahan royal family, an uncle of Sultan Saiboen. He studied medicine at the STOVIA medical school in Batavia, where from 1917 to 1919 he was the founding chairman of the Jong Sumatranen Bond, a Sumatran nationalist organization. He subsequently continued his medical studies in Leiden, where he specialized in surgery. There, he met and married a Dutch woman. He later worked as a doctor in Sulawesi and Batavia, then returned to Medan where he became a highly respected surgeon and wrote medical books in the Malay language.

In February 1940, Mansur was elected head of the East Sumatra Association (Persatuan Sumatera Timur - PST), an organisation that had been established in April 1938 to educate and improve the welfare of indigenous people, principally Malays, Karos, and Simalungun people. Although it had been formed by non-aristocratic people, it was thought that having a member of the Asahan royal family as leader would increase its influence and attract more members. By 1941, the organisation had 900 members.

== The Japanese occupation and aftermath ==
In 1942, the Japanese invaded and occupied the East Indies. In June 1943, the Japanese government announced that Indonesians would be permitted "political participation" and this resulted in advisory councils (shu sangi kai) being set up in each residency to consider questions put to them by the local Japanese leadership. In March 1945, Mansur was appointed chairman of the Japanese East Sumatra advisory council.

On 15 August 1945, the Japanese surrendered, and two days later, Indonesian nationalist leader Sukarno proclaimed the independence of Indonesia in Jakarta. However, this surrender was only announced a week later, while the proclamation was only known about by the Indonesian elite, who worried that it would upset the relationships between the various groups. On 29 August, Mansur invited prominent Indonesian figures to his house to discuss their response to the events. There were two outcomes from this meeting: a statement asking the people to stay calm, and the establishment of a committee led by Mansur and the Sultan of Langkat tasked with explaining to the victorious Allies why they had needed to cooperate with this Japanese. This was an attempt to avoid accusations of collaboration. Rumors soon spread that this was in fact a committee established to welcome the returning Dutch colonial forces, or even to seize power in the meantime. The sultans and the Sumatran elite, anxious to protect their own status and interests, had been hoping for the return of the Dutch and for what they saw as the normal state of affairs to be restored. Masur made a decision to not cooperate with the republic. However, pro-independence activists were much stronger in their support for the Republic of Indonesia. Tensions between the two sides grew more intense, and culminated in the outbreak of the East Sumatra "social revolution" in March 1946. A large number of aristocrats were killed, and the sultanates were dissolved. According to a Dutch report, 127 of Mansur's relatives were killed in this period.

== Head of the State of East Sumatra ==
By the middle of 1946 the violence had subsided, and the arrival of Dutch military forces meant the pro-republican forces were under pressure. The surviving elite made statements of loyalty to the Dutch and began to press for an "autonomous" East Sumatra region under Dutch protection. They were supported in this by the majority of members of the Malay, ethnic Chinese and Eurasian inhabitants. This led to plans for a plantation economy-based East Sumatran state, but without the sultans in their previous privileged positions.

On 31 July 1947, a mass meeting was held in Medan to call for the formation of a state of East Sumatra. One speaker read out a petition addressed to the Dutch Lieutenant Governor General asking him to recognize such a state within a federal Indonesia. He also announced the formation of a Committee for an East Sumatra Special Region (Comite Daerah Istimewa Soematera Timoer - Comite DIST) with Mansur as chairman. The Dutch began establishing the necessary bureaucracy and on August 25, a meeting was held at Mansur's house attended by DIST committee members, other supporters and Dutch officials to discuss the establishment of the state. The State of East Sumatra (NST) was established by decree on 25 December 1947, and it was officially proclaimed on 29 January the following year, with Mansur as head of state (Wali Negara).

As head of the NST, Mansur tried to build a state that was Malay-led, but not simply a reincarnation of the old social structure headed by sultans. This caused discontent among the former aristocrats, and at the same time Mansur was unable to attract support from immigrant communities, particularly the ethnic Javanese, who still mistrusted him. Meanwhile support for the Republic of Indonesia continued to grow. By early 1950, all the states of the United States of Indonesia except East Sumatra and the NST had dissolved themselves into the Republic of Indonesia. From 3–5 May 1950, Mansur met with Indonesian Vice-president Hatta and East Indonesian head of state Soekowati and agreed to combine all three states into a unitary Indonesian state. On 17 August 1950, the NST ceased to exist.

Tengku Mansur died five years later, in 1955.
