= East Sumatra revolution =

1946 movement in Indonesia

The East Sumatra revolution, also known as the East Sumatra social revolution (Revolusi Sosial Sumatera Timur), began on 3 March 1946. Across 25 "native states", many sultanates were overthrown and mass killing of members of the aristocratic families were performed by armed pergerakan groups (Indonesian nationalists). To the opportunistic pergerakan militants (especially Communist Party of Indonesia leaders Abdoe'lxarim M. S. and Luat Siregar), the revolutionary movement was seen as one of the means for East Sumatra to be freed from colonial overlordship and to join the larger Indonesian National Revolution. Participants of the revolution were believed to be provoked by leaders to kill aristocrats and create violence. These belligerents had three prime objectives: to eliminate the sultans and aristocrats (who were seen as Dutch allies), to seize their wealth (as sources of funding for the Indonesian independence campaign) and to eliminate the region's feudal social structure. The revolution brought about the formation of the State of East Sumatra, which was dissolved when the region became part of the Indonesian republic.

== Background ==
The Dutch subjugated the Minangkabau of Sumatra in the Padri War and the Dutch expedition on the west coast of Sumatra occurred. There followed the conquest of the Aceh Sultanate of Sumatra.

East Sumatra during colonial period was dominated by plantation with workers from diverse ethnicities. This was exploited by capitalism of European and benefit for local aristocratic group such as local chiefs and sultans. As government power became unstable because of Japanese occupation, tension between ethnicities and social class erupted.

=== East Sumatra under the Dutch (1930s–1942) ===
==== Ethnic tensions ====
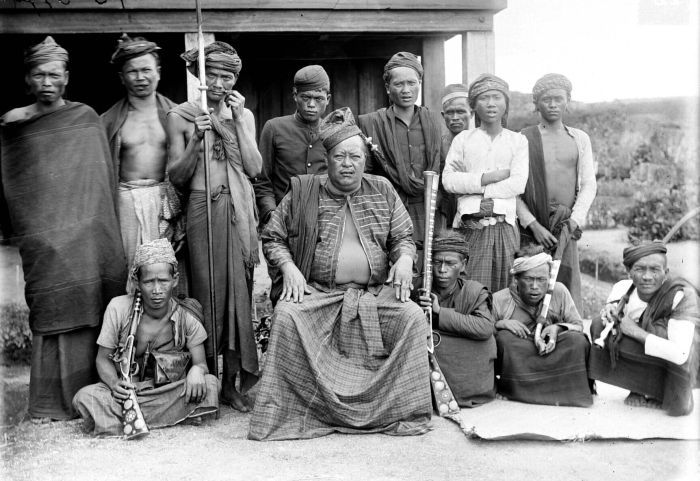
King of Dolok Silau with his entourage

The influx of Chinese, Javanese, and other ethnic immigrants to the region during the 1930s gave rise to several official associations associated with the kingdom to identify certain customary elements to form the cultural core of the East Sumatra society. Even though the Karo, Malays, and Simalungun peoples were all recognised as indigenous communities in the region, the royalty and associations chose to emphasize more on preserving the Malay cultural identity. Special privileges were granted to the Malays (such as accessing to plantation land) by the Dutch and the social status of the Malays appeared to be much higher than the other indigenous communities in East Sumatra. As a result, members of the other two indigenous communities as well as the other locals felt this was unfair and that resulted in unwanted ethnic tensions. An increasing number of locals began to disagree with the Dutch and the Malay aristocrats due to the bias that these elites had towards the Malays.

==== Religious divisions and Islamic movements ====
Another division between the Malays and the two groups was religion, whereby the Malays were mostly Muslims and majority of the Karo and Simalungun were Christians or animists. Despite being the third-largest group in the 1930s, the Javanese, in particular the Abangan, were perceived by the Malays to have a lower social status and their practice of Islam was seen to be nominal. The Malays were usually regarded as the traditional protectors of Islam by the authorities and the other Muslim reformist forces who advocated an Islam different from the Malay orientation were seen as threats to the authority of the sultans. The former was known as the Kaum Tua (old group) and the latter as the Kaum Muda (young group, reformist) who "...sought to free the Islamic communities from superstitious beliefs.".

There were two major modernist Islamic movements launched by the Kaum Muda: firstly, the Muhammadiyah movement that involved conflicts over religious texts and teachings and secondly, the Jamiatul Wasliyah organization which shared common interests with Muhammadiah. Even though the Kuam Muda presented themselves as "non-political" Islamic leaders, the kerajaan, literally means 'kingdom,' which in this case refers to the indirectly ruled states of Dutch East Indies, still regarded those organizations with hostility and decided to support the Kuam Tua instead. Hence, the Malays were said to claim dominance in both political and cultural spheres, which led to resentment of the Malay aristocratic class and Malays in general.

==== The political movement ====
During the late 1930s, the national movements led by the pergerakan were developing rapidly among urban and educated sections of the Indonesian community. One example was the East Sumatra Association, which was created in 1938 by Dutch-educated Malays and was later led by Dr Tengku Mansur (who was connected to the Asahan royal family). The political association aimed to improve the social status of East Sumatran natives, including Simalungun people and Karo people (Indonesia). The national movement then slowly reached out to small farmers of the tobacco-growing area, which eventually provided the rudiments of an important rural base for the two nationalist parties, GERINDO and PARINDRA in East Sumatra. Besides raising voices that disagreed with the Dutch repression and Malay aristocracy, the two parties also played important roles in initiating and mobilizing resources to support the 1946 East Sumatra social revolution.

=== East Sumatra during the Japanese occupation (1942–early 1945) ===
Japanese paratroopers during the invasion of Sumatra in February 1942

During the occupation, the Japanese implemented policies that were perceived as a continuance of Dutch support for the kerajaan. Under the policies, the kerajaan were able to gain access to various incomes, titles, and religious authority that they used to have in the 1930s. However, Japanese used available fragmentation between the pergerakan and the kerajaan. The regaining of Malay aristocrats' power during the Japanese Occupation resulted in suppression of the peasant community in East Sumatra. Many Japanese officials managed to exploit food and labour supplies from the peasantry through the kerajaan hierarchy and that had increased the amount of economic pressure faced by the farming population of East Sumatra. Although, moderate members of PARINDRA, one of the pergerakan nationalist parties, even took the initiative to form a Comité Indonesia in an attempt to present a united pergerakan front to the Japanese. They were motivated to launch a new Indonesian-controlled administration with the support from the Japanese. However, the garnering of support from the Japanese did not work out well because the priority of the Japanese was to obtain the oil and plantation produce from East Sumatra rather than making any significant political changes to the existing government structures. Furthermore, the policies adopted by the Japanese were seen as a continuance of Dutch support for the kerajaan that caused nationalists to hold stronger negative feelings towards the Sultans and Malay aristocrats.

Consequently, the credibility of those traditional, nationalists and religious leaders, who were assigned by the Japanese, was severely damaged. A new leadership was then formed by a group of pemuda (youth) who had received their formative education under the Japanese military groups (Giyūgun, Heiho and Tokkeitai). The military training guided by Japanese ethics and values fanned their nationalism and motivated them to defend their lands. These Japanese-trained pemuda then took on active roles in fighting against the Dutch and Malay sultans during the 1946 East Sumatra Social Revolution.

=== Allied landings, local struggles and period of uncertainty (late 1945–1946) ===
After the Japanese surrendered, the independence of Indonesia was declared in Jakarta and Sukarno was chosen as the president of a new republic. Sumatra was then declared to be a province of the new republic and Medan was chosen as its capital. Despite this, many leaders were worried about the possibility of the Dutch returning and of the Malay and Batak aristocrats regaining their former power.

From 21 August, leaflets were sent to Sumatra on Netherlands Indies Civil Administration. Japanese surrender was publicly announced on 22 August. On 25 August, Naval Lt. Brondgeest and Dutch-dominated unit landed near Pangkalan Brandan. Brondgeest, by 1 September, had been established base in Medan and contact with Japanese, Sultan of Deli, Sultan of Langkat, and other cooperative natives. This cooperative native asked for some reforms. Brondgeest decided to act independently from British and Japanese with local Ambonese and Menadonese as police force to control Medan and Republican movement. The Muslim fast was ended on 7 August and celebrated by mending relation with pro-Dutch peoples. On 14 September, Lt. Westerling and 3 others who were part of Dutch commando entered Medan to equip the police force.

Many of the Japanese-trained unemployed pemuda of ex-Giyugun were then recruited by Abdoe'lxarim M. S. – the executor of the former Badan Oentoek Membantor Pertahanan Asia (Body for Assisting the Defence of Asia / BOMPA) property, who fed them BOMPA rice-stocks, and were then organised into a broader Persatuan Pemuda Latihan (Trained Youth Association) which include police, soldiers, and officials. On 23 September, the senior ex-Giyugun officer, First Lieutenant Achmad Tahir issued a meeting for all Japanese-trained Pemuda in Asrama Rensheikei. Among these groups, some had contact with 'underground' groups with pre-war left wing experience. These groups include Karo group under the leaderships of Selamat Ginting, Tama Ginting, and Rakutta Sembiring Brahmana, and an "anti-fascist" group under Nathar Zainuddin a veteran Islamist communist, which include Urbanus Pardede, Bustami, Joenoes Nasution, and Marzuki Lubis. They plan to contact with Aminuddin Nazir of Inoue's coastal guard and by evening Badan Pemuda Indonesia or BPI was formed under Achmad Tahir as First Chairman. Before the landings of the Allied (British) forces, these young pemuda were actively propagating information about the republic. They persuaded the senior Indonesian officials to resist the Japanese, the Dutch and Malay aristocrats. Therefore, these pemuda were seen as very nationalistic, eager to resist the return of the Dutch, and unsympathetic to the various kerajaan." On 6 October, new Sultan of Deli who was known for his skeptic of Republic was installed. By 10 October 1945, Tentara Keamanan Rakyat or TKR of East Sumatra was formed with Achmad Tahir as Commander, Soetjipto as Chief-of-Staff, Capt. Hotman Sitoempul in Siantar, Lt. Martinus Lubis in Brastagi, and Lt. Djamin Ginting in Kabanjahe.

The initial landings of Allied forces (the British) and the Dutch, were not opposed by pemuda troops as Governor Hasan followed official republican policies of cooperating with the Allied. The flashpoint in Medan was the former Pensiun Wilhelmina in Jalan Bali, Medan, which was used as hostel and housed Westerling's ex-KNIL troops of mainly Ambonese. On 13 October 1945, supposedly an incident happened where one of the Dutch sentries torn off and trampled a red and white pin worn by a child. An angry crowd began to gather and fighting began, resulting several wounded. Two Dutchman fired into the crowd from a car killing an Indonesian. Japanese troops arrived alongside TKR under Achmad Tahir and managed to calm the crowd. The crowd dispersed at 1.30 p.m., with two Indonesians and one Ambonese woman were killed in the fighting. However two hours later, pemuda returned, leaving six killed and about 100 wounded among the Ambonese and Menadonese. The Dutchman in charge of the hotel and a Swiss family were killed as a result. The attack spread to Pematangsiantar, and on 15 October, a five-man detachment under Brondgeest who was sent to Siantar Hotel to check on Japanese troop concentrated there was attacked. The hotel was besieged and burned, killing all the Dutch soldiers, ten Ambonese soldiers, two pemuda and four Swiss who managed the hotel. These marked the beginning of Battle of Medan, between republican troops of TKR under Achmad Tahir as well as various pemuda affiliated with semi-criminal Medan underworld and Allied forces under T.E.D Kelly.

On 18 October 1945, the control of Medan became the responsibility of the British, immediately after official orders were issued by Republican leaders for pemuda to surrender their weapons to the British troops. Nonetheless, the pemuda of East Sumatra managed to acquire some weapons that were left over by Japanese soldiers after the surrender and used them to confront the British in the south of Medan on 10 December 1945. A strong sense of contingency was said to be present in the British policy as the political circumstances in Indonesia forced them to make decisions that were seemingly neither pro-Dutch nor pro-Indonesian, although British intelligence manipulated events to pressure the (British) Malay monarchs for political initiatives in order to avoid being revolutionary targets. Tensions between the Dutch and British modes of operation as well as the strong resistance from Indonesian nationalists resulted in low British morale throughout the post-war British occupation. After consultation with General Chambers in Padang, on 26 October Kelly disarmed and disbanded Ambonese forces under Westerling and Brondgeest, and the Dutch detainees were again guarded by Japanese forces. Only Westerling remained behind at Kelly's request to put his terrorist tactics to work with the British. British commander published on 24 December 1945 his intent to recognise TKR as official peacekeeper outside of Medan and British would give weapons (rubber-for-weapons) for some republican within Medan after rubber smuggling from Sumatra to Singapore in the period February–April 1946.

==== Fear and revolutionary fervour (1946) ====
Map of Republican-controlled areas in Sumatra and Borneo, seized by Dutch intelligence, showing East Sumatra as dominated by loyalists of Tan Malaka, 1948–1949.

Armed clashes with the British, Dutch, and Japanese remained at a low level for the next two months until rumours that the Dutch were about to attempt a landing started spreading among the locals. Inspired by the formation of Tan Malaka's Persatuan Perjuangan in Java, Abdoe'lxarim M. S. and Luat Siregar negotiated with fragmented nationalist groups around East Sumatra in forming a 'United Front'. Although PKI cadres, Abdoe'lxarim M. S. and Luat Siregar were highly sympathetic to the political ideology and teachings of Tan Malaka. In revolutionary fervour, and rumours of the Dutch return, both negotiated the creation of the Sumatra branch of the Persatuan Perjuangan. Formed in 11 February 1946, the Sumatran Persatuan Perjuangan was created with a union between 20 Groups, more dominant by Pesindo, the PKI, and the PNI. With the exclusion of Indonesian conservative and moderatic officials, the Sumatran Persatuan Perjuangan became widely radicalised in the opposition of the kerajaan. Moreso after the advocation of the '100% independence' (100% Merdeka) principle created by Tan Malaka and General Sudirman.

On 27 February, Mohammad Amir, then as the first Deputy Governor of Sumatra, attempted to defuse the tensions of the pemuda and the Persatuan Perjuangan by having a train tour through Tebing Tinggi, Kisaran, Tanjung Balai, Asahan and Pematang Siantar to better negotiate the conditions, accompanied by radical leaders including Joenoes Nasution. However, they were met with opposition, heckling, and mass graffiti by the Pemuda on some stops. At the end of the tour, on 2 March, Amir and members of the Indonesian government would depart from Medan. Believing the time was ripe for revolution, the Sumatran Persatuan Perjuangan launched its first move on dismantling the Malay kerajaan system.

On 3 March 1946, thousands of armed pemuda surrounded the palace in Tanjung Balai in response to the wide dissemination of reports that claimed that the kerajaan had formed a Comité van Ontvangst (reception committee) to welcome the Dutch. The outbreak of violence between the kerajaan and the armed pemuda hence marked the start of the 1946 East Sumatra Social Revolution.

== East Sumatra Social Revolution: 3 March 1946 ==
On 3 March 1946, thousands of armed men assembled to oppose the big sultanates after hearing the rumours that the Dutch were returning. Violence and bloodshed was involved, where seven princes, ninety aristocrats (in Langkat) and countless officials from native states were killed. The Sultan of Langkat's daughters were raped and poet Tengku Amir Hamzah was killed on 9 March by the Pemuda (young Japanese-trained militant) leaders and many Malay farmers were forced to give up their plantation land that they had acquired under the Dutch to be redistributed for those former plantation workers and non-Malay farmers (mostly Javanese). The militants under the leadership of PESINDO (Pemuda Sosialis Indonesia), the Indonesian Communist Party, and the Indonesian National Party attacked almost all of the Malay aristocrats. The wives and children of the aristocrat families were interned and their houses were ransacked for treasure by the Pemuda. The sympathy that Malay aristocrats had for the Dutch and the threats that they represented to the independence of Indonesia were commonly seen as the two main reasons for the occurrence of this violent event.

=== Main objectives ===
There were three main objectives associated with the revolution that involved different groups of people: firstly, to seize Malay aristocrats and their principal supporters so as to thwart their plans for the return of the Dutch; secondly, gain control of kerajaan the Malay sultanates' wealth in order to sustain the expenses for the national struggle and thirdly, to exercise political and societal changes in accordance to the Marxist intellectuals who were involved in the event.

=== Causes ===
The 1946 East Sumatra social revolution was an outcome of class, ideological, and ethnic tensions that had accumulated over several decades. Since the Dutch colonial period, the region's demographics, socio-political structure, and economic system had undergone great changes. Many locals, especially those of the low and middle classed, who were consistently suppressed under the hierarchy system, became highly dissatisfied with the kerajaan hierarchy and the Dutch. The national revolution also reflected a great diversity of interests from almost all sections of Sumatran society and several complex issues behind the fight for independence in East Sumatra.

==== Political causes ====
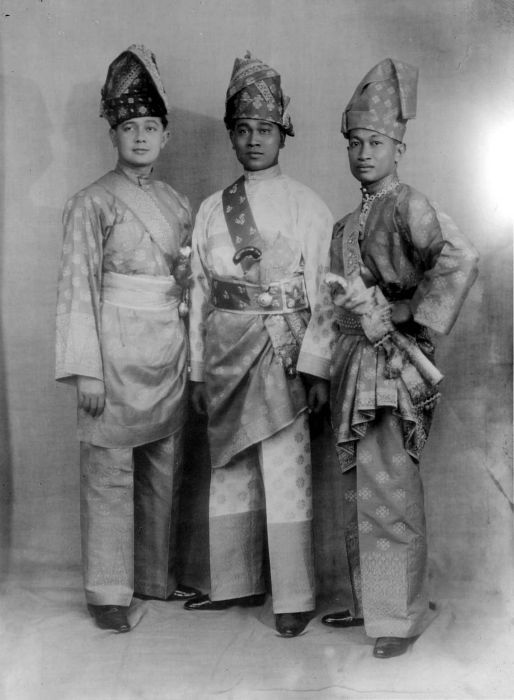
Malay princes of East Sumatra from the Royal Houses of Deli, Langkat and Serdang

By 1942, the Dutch, who were accountable to the Netherlands East Indies government in Batavia, were holding on to majority of the administrative power in the region. A feudal government was formed over the four primary sultanates in the region (Langkat, Serdang, Deli, and Asahan) and kerajaan before (and after) the arrival of the Dutch, Under Dutch rule, the kingdoms and principalities were absorbed into a centralised political structure and these indigenous elites were included in the administration (which they shared with the Dutch) of the region. Consequently, both the Dutch and Malay aristocrats were able to use their political power to launch policies that suppressed the rights of the commoners. Opposition to the Dutch repression and Malay aristocracy then began to arise among ordinary people. On 3 March 1946, thousands of armed pemuda surrounded the palace in Tanjung Balai in response to the wide dissemination of reports that claimed that the kerajaan had formed a Comité van Ontvangst (reception committee) to welcome the Dutch.

In late February 1946, Major Ferguson, part of British intelligence, was closely linked with political machinations in East Sumatra. The sultan of Deli had armed British protection and allowed his state to become a stronghold of British Intelligence. A rumour circulated that the sultans of East Sumatra proposed to form a dominion within British Malaya. The dominion proposal was created to elicit hostility from the pemuda. After it was circulated, British authorities ignored the suggestion. Then, the sultans returned into cooperation with the Dutch. Major Ferguson and the acting governor of East Sumatra, Dr Amir, visited places in East Sumatra and returned to Medan on 2 March 1946.

Either Comité van Ontvangst to welcome the Dutch or British dominion proposal were anathema to the pemuda. For the pemuda, kerajaan symbolised colonial injustice. Whether under Dutch or British masters, kerajaan would remain elitist and become executive of foreign oppression. This would lead to immediate demand of retribution.

==== Socio-economic causes ====
Apart from political causes, labour policies were also implemented to sustain the economy of the region. Large numbers of foreign labourers were brought in from China and Java to meet the strong demand for labour in East Sumatra's plantation economy (which made up 64 percent of economic production). "In the case of the plantation economy in this region, this foreign labour was predominantly from the relatively overcrowded island of Java: by the 1930s, 43 percent of the population was 'Javanese'." In addition to the Chinese and Javanese (who numbered about 192,000 and 590,000, respectively during the 1930s), the economy also attracted migrants from other parts of the Dutch East Indies. As a result, the percentages of the three main indigenous communities: the Malays, Karo, and Simalungun in the region were significantly reduced. The changes in social structure prompted anxiety among the people of East Sumatra.

The change in the socio-economic landscape also resulted in stark class differences within East Sumatran society. In the 1930s, many farmers of the tobacco area (Deli-Serdang-Langkat) were told to cultivate smaller areas while the Malay sultans, Simalungun, and Karo rajas benefited from preferential treatment by the Dutch in terms of land leasing. Those aristocrats were able to accumulate significant wealth by "leas[ing] wide tracts of land, the disposal rights over which frequently had lain traditionally with the village, to foreign companies..." and seizing most of the profits. Eventually, most of the rural masses went to seek help from local political parties such as GERINDO (Gerakan Rakyat Indonesia) and the Great Indonesia Party (Partai Indonesia Raya) so as to make their grievances heard. The feelings of dissatisfaction that rural farmers had against the aristocrats then became a form of support for these political parties.

=== Leaders involved in the revolution ===
There were a few groups of leaders that were involved in the revolution and all of them may be distinguished by differences in class, social mobility, nationalist seniority, and ideology.

Firstly, educated Indonesians who were sympathetic to the ideology of nationalism were involved in the revolution. Most of them received tertiary education and have adopted Western values and practices in their daily life. The connections with the traditional aristocratic families did not manage to stop these people from having strong beliefs in nationalism. Ultimately, they recognized that the presence of kerajaan might be one of the hindrances for East Sumatran society to achieve full liberalization. Members of this particular group were local governors and regional deputy governors such as Teuku Muhammad Hasan and Mohammad Amir.

Besides, there was also another group of leaders who shared a similar ideology of nationalism. Unlike those mentioned earlier, this group of leaders were actively involved with nationalist movements before the Pacific War. Most of them used to collaborate with the Japanese occupiers as administrative personnel and they were motivated to join this revolution so as to promote the political ideology of nationalism as well as to continue their leadership during the post-war period.

Secondly, locals who rose to prominence after undergoing military training in Japanese military organisations during the period of Japanese occupation were also responsible for the revolution. These "people's volunteer armies" were equipped with rich military experiences and that has imbued them with a deeper commitment to radical nationalism. Eventually, some of them became militia leaders in the earlier phase of the social revolution. Many scholars, including Anthony Reid and Mohammad Said have highlighted the importance of these people in initiating and executing the 1946 social revolution in East Sumatra.

Thirdly, Muslim reformist forces were involved in Islamic movements to resist against the kerajaan and Malay aristocrats. Supporters of the Islamic movements had faced oppression by the sultans, who claimed that they were advocating an Islam that was different from the Malay orientation. In order to protect their own religious interests, these anti-kerajaan activists came together to fight against the Malay elites.

== Aftermath ==
=== East Sumatra ===
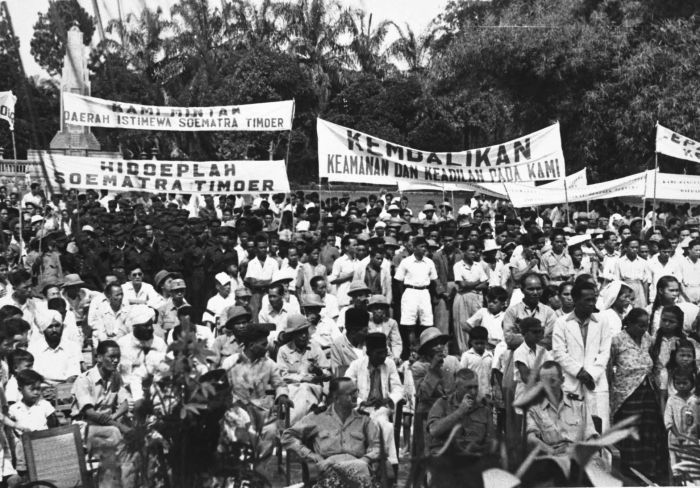
NST supporters

The revolutionaries, including the armed Pemuda, were able to fight the Dutch return with a common unifying goal in 1945, but there were insufficient resources to last through a longer period than 1947. The Dutch return during the second half of 1947 had to rely on the support from Malay aristocrats, especially when it was facing tougher guerrilla opposition after the ceasefire. In addition to Malay support for the reinstatement of Dutch rule, representatives of other groups expressed similar concerns (some Toba leaders and the Chinese community, in particular; these groups had benefited economically from Dutch rule). The Chinese community, who were economically advantaged, were also targeted by the pemuda and their property was seized. In this uncertain milieu, the Chinese community saw the British and Dutch colonial forces as protectors.

The East Sumatra Union (Persatuan Sumatera Timur) had been formed in 1938 by the westernized Malay elites to reassert Malay and Simalungun ethnic interests through support from the Dutch. With the support of these Malays, the Dutch attempted to establish a federal Indonesia consisting of a Dutch-supported State of East Sumara (Indonesian: Negara Sumatera Timur, NST). The threat felt by the Chinese also motivated them to co-operate with the Malay aristocrats, most of the Simalungun rajas, some Karo chieftains and the Dutch in creating the NST. Dr Tengku Mansur (a member of the Asahan royal family) was selected as head of state and the NST lasted from December 1947 to August 1950. While the Dutch wanted the NST to be seen as an orderly and progressive alternative to the republic, the Western-educated aristocrats saw NST as a bastion for their own ethnic interests. The NST began to disintegrate as soon as Dutch military support was withdrawn. The short-lived state was viewed with suspicion, and Dr Tengku Mansur eventually surrendered authority to the republic in August 1950, which was backed by military for the stability framework. Consequently, East Sumatra was merged into a larger province of North Sumatra, where it has remained till today.

=== Malaya ===
The demise of the sultans in East Sumatra was the turning point in British Malaya. This was politically motivating Malayan Malays against the Malay Nationalist Party (MNP) linked to Tan Malaka and the Indonesians. During March 1946, United Malays National Organisation (UMNO) went with full support of the Malay sultans as their inactivity would lead to similar fate as their relatives in East Sumatra. From August to November 1946, UMNO was in negotiations with the British while MNP was excluded. The rise of UMNO gave political voice for the popular support commanded by the conservative elite, inseparable to events in Indonesia, and has been beneficial for long-term British presence.

== See also ==
- Indonesian National Revolution
- History of Indonesia
