= State of East Sumatra =

1947–1950 Dutch client state then state of Indonesia

Negara Sumatera Timur Sumatra's Oostkust
- State of the United States of Indonesia
- 1947 – 1950 (Sovereign state until 27 December 1949)
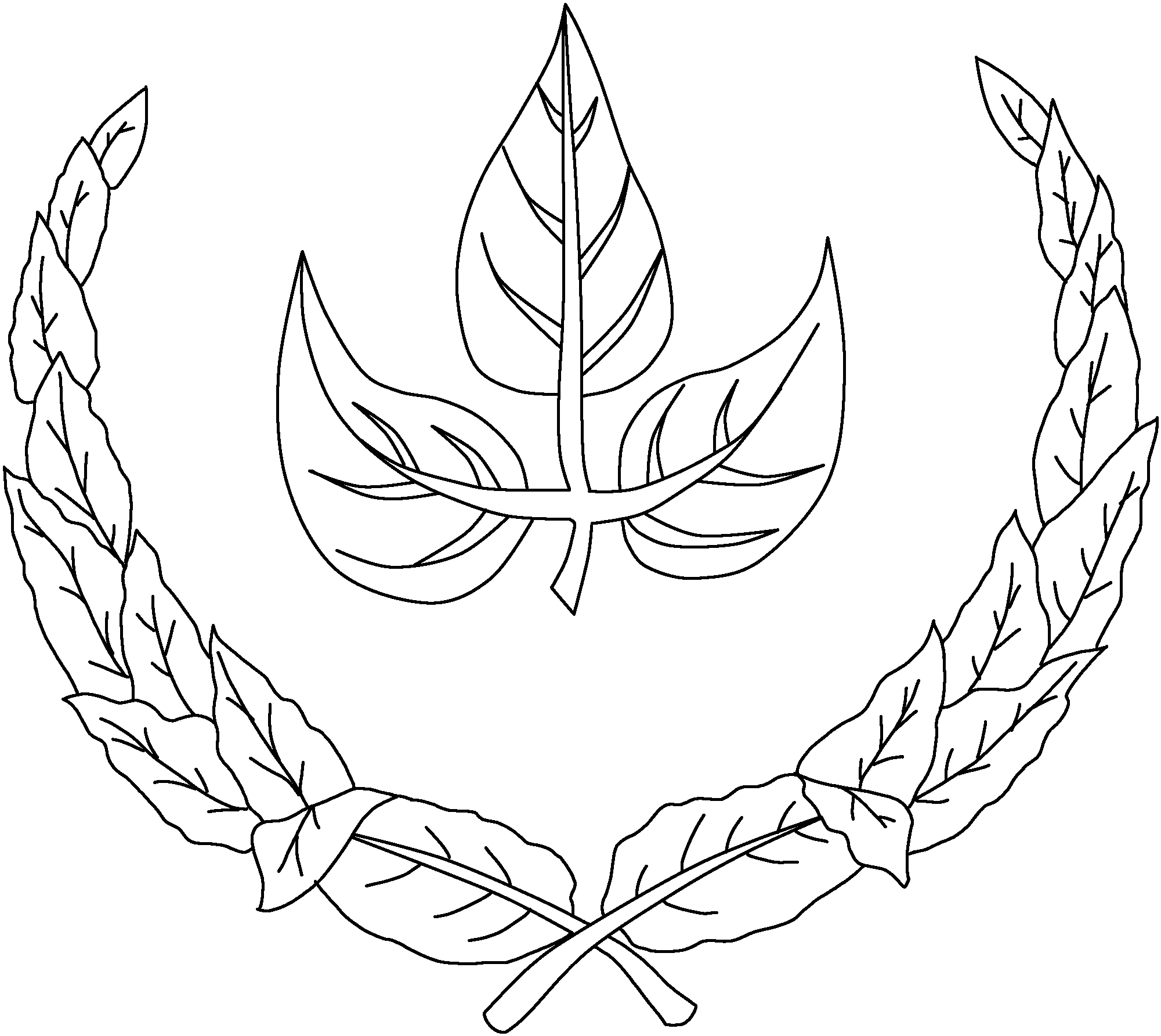
- Flag Coat of arms

- Location of East Sumatra within the United States of Indonesia
- Capital: Medan
- Government
- Wali Negara
  - 1947–1950: Tengku Mansur
- Historical era: Indonesian National Revolution
  - Established: 25 December 1947
  - Dissolution (law): 15 August 1950
Preceded by	Succeeded by
Republic of Indonesia	North Sumatra

The State of East Sumatra (Negara Sumatera Timur) was established by the Netherlands after the reoccupation of North Sumatra in July, 1947, during the first of the Dutch police actions against the fledgling Republic of Indonesia. In 1949, as part of a peace deal that concluded the Indonesian National Revolution, it joined the United States of Indonesia, of which the Republic was also a component state. In August, 1950, it was absorbed into the Republic as part of the province of North Sumatra. The area covered by the former state included the present-day regencies of Langkat (southern part), Deli Serdang, Serdang Bedagai, Karo, Simalungan, Batubara and Asahan (northern part), together with the cities geographically within those regencies.

== History ==
The Dutch focused their campaign to re-establish colonial rule in Sumatra on Northeast Sumatra for economic and political reasons. Before the Japanese invasion of the Netherlands East Indies in 1942 the region had been home to highly productive plantations and oil fields. The prewar Dutch had worked closely with local Malay sultans to administer the region and make its natural resources available to Western capital. By the 1930s most of the plantation workforce and the urban middle class of Medan were immigrants from other parts of Sumatra and Java, while ethnic minorities like the autochthonous Malays, Karo, and Simalungun, and immigrant Chinese enjoyed privileged positions within the colonial system.

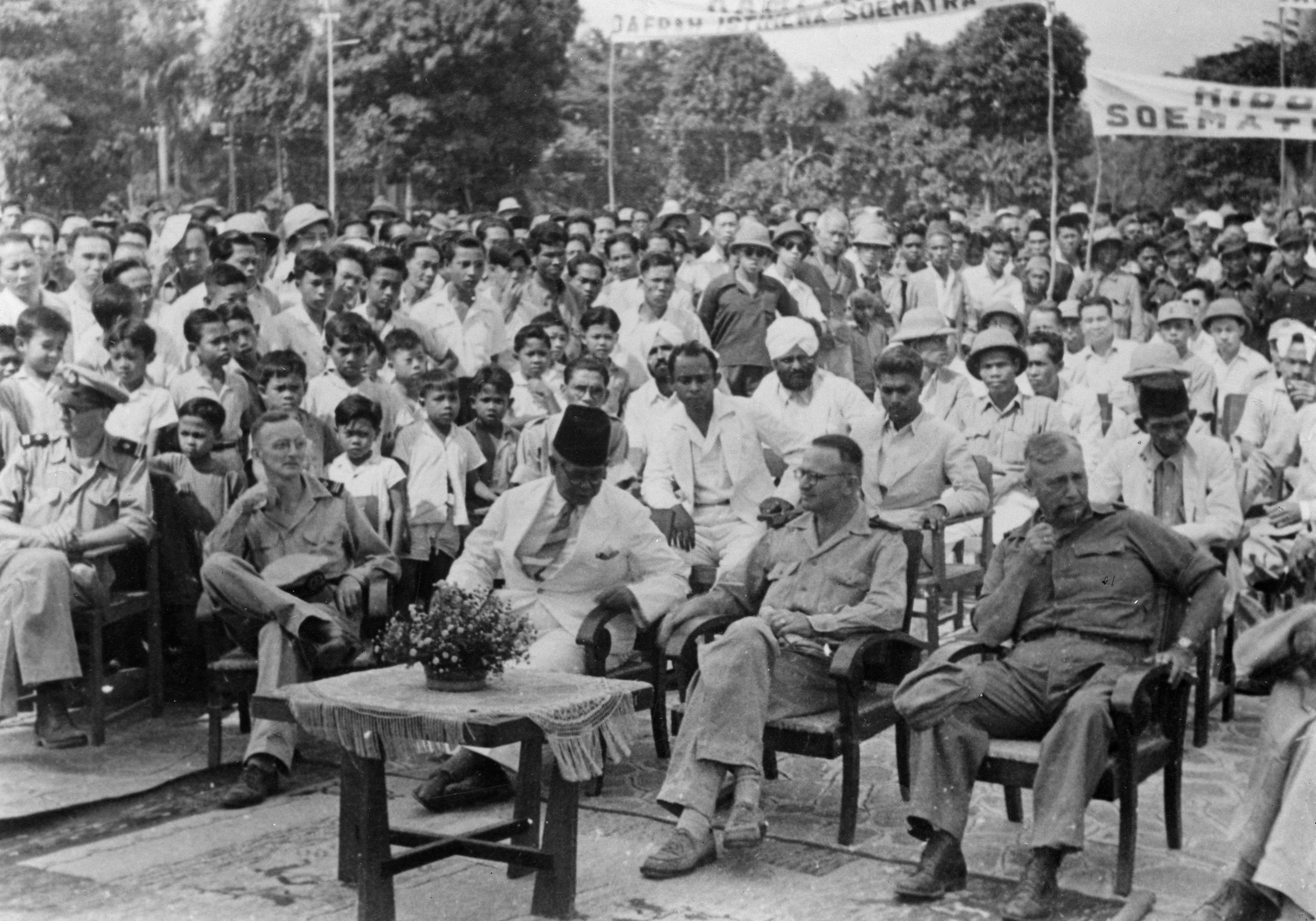
Demonstration of NST supporters during the visit of the Wali of East Sumatra to Pematangsiantar

In the aftermath of the Japanese surrender and proclamation of Indonesian independence by Sukarno and Mohammad Hatta in August, 1945, the newly established Republic of Indonesia began to set up offices in East Sumatra. However, Republican officials only had tenuous control over groups of radicalized, pro-independence youths (pemuda) who had received training and arms from the Japanese during the war. Frustrated with the moderation of Republican politicians, the pemuda initiated a "social revolution" in March, 1946, killing much of the Malay and Simalungun aristocracy, sweeping away the former sultanate governments, and raiding the shops and warehouses of wealthy (often Chinese) businessmen. A year later the returning Dutch felt that they could rely on the support of these groups in setting up a new government in East Sumatra that could compete for legitimacy with the Republic.

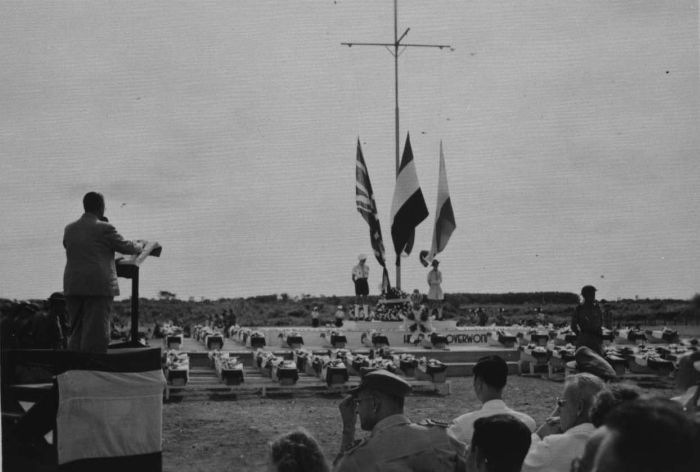
Tengku Mansur, President of East Sumatra delivering a speech during a military funeral, 23 November 1949.

Twelve of the original thirteen members of the committee that formed to demand autonomy for East Sumatra following the return of the Dutch were Malays or Simalunguns. East Sumatra's first, and only, head of state was Dr. Tengku Mansur, uncle of the former Sultan of Asahan and leader of the prewar Malay organization Persatuan Sumatera Timur (East Sumatra Association). The new government did not attempt to reinstate the traditional sultanates of the region, but it also made no attempts to hold democratic elections or incorporate "moderates" of other ethnicities into its administration, in spite of constant Dutch pressure to do so.

Following the Dutch-Indonesian Round Table Conference in late 1949, the Dutch withdrew military support from the State of East Sumatra and its local authority began to collapse. Dr. Mansur entered into negotiations with Mohammad Hatta to reunify East Sumatra with the Republic of Indonesia in May, 1950. East Sumatra merged with the former Dutch Tapanoeli Residency (Tapanuli) to become the province of North Sumatra on 15 August 1950.

== See also ==
- History of Indonesia
- Indonesian National Revolution
- Indonesian regions
- Nerus Ginting Suka, East Sumatra representative in the USI legislature
