= Sumatra's East Coast Residency =

Administrative subdivision of the Dutch East Indies

Sumatra's East Coast Residency Residentie Oostkust van Sumatra
- Residency of Dutch East Indies
- 1873–1942
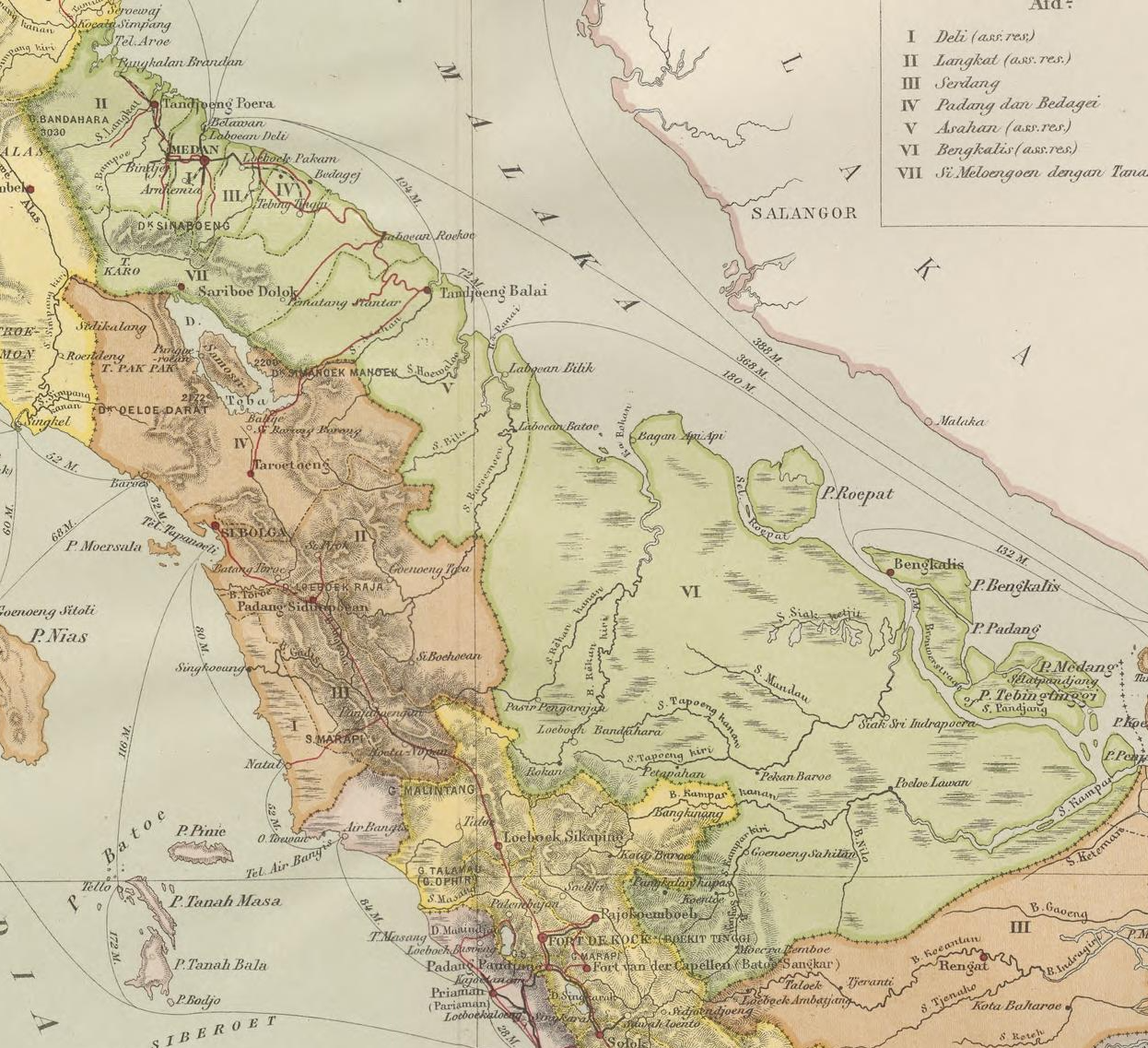
- Malay-language map of East Sumatra Residency (1909)
- Capital: Medan
- Area
  - 1930: 94,583 km^{2} (36,519 sq mi)
- Population
  - 1930: 1,693,200
- History
  - Established: 1873
  - Disestablished: 1942
- Today part of: North Sumatra and Riau provinces

Sumatra's East Coast Residency (Dutch: Residentie Oostkust van Sumatra) was an administrative subdivision of the Dutch East Indies with its capital in Medan. It was located in northern Sumatra. In 1938, there were 10,026 square kilometers of plantations in the northern part of the residency, known as the Estates Area.

== Formation ==
From the early 19th century the Dutch gradually took control of Sumatra, starting from the south. In east coast of Sumatra, the sultanates of Asahan, Serdang, Deli, and Langkat, as well as other states such as Bilah and Kotapinang, were subjugated between 1662 and 1865, and these sultans were subsequently used by the Dutch to indirectly rule the "native states", as they became known.

The inland Batak areas were under Dutch control by 1895. The East Coast Residency was established in 1873, headed by a resident initially based in Bengkalis in the Siak Sultanate, and from 1887 in Medan, which was at the center of the tobacco plantation region. The residency took its final form in 1908 after Tamiang, a small area in the north, was transferred to Aceh

== Plantations ==
In 1863, the first Dutch settler, Jacobus Nienjuys, arrived and began to plant tobacco, nutmeg and coconut. Others followed, and established plantations to grow tropical crops such as tobacco, rubber, palm oil and coffee on 1,000 hectares of land leased from the sultan of Deli. These plants grew very well in the region's volcanic soil. The planation economy really began to grow in 1869, with a lease of 25,000 hectares of land in Deli being granted by the sultan to the Deli Corporation (Deli Maatschappij) for tobacco. The company established a local base in the village of Medan, and over the following three decades, transformed the sultanate into a huge commercial tobacco growing region. By 1872, there were 15 tobacco plantations, 13 of them in Deli, and production increased so fast, that in 1883, it was ten times higher than a decade previously. Once the available land in Deli had been planted on, tobacco plantations were established in Langkat and Serdang, and then in other regions. However, this level of production led to a global tobacco glut, and in 1891, the United States began charging high import duties on tobacco. As a result, production in Sumatra fell significantly, as did profits. Plantation companies began to seek more profitable alternatives.

In 1902, commercial rubber cultivation began in Serdang, which brought huge profits. British and American companies, including the Goodyear Rubber Company made huge investments. Plantations were subsequently established in Simalungun and Asahan. In 1911, oil palm plantations were established in Asahan and Simalungun, and these two crops provided the bulk of the profits for the plantation sector for the next two decades.

== Administration ==
By 1910, all the traditional rulers of East Sumatra had recognized Dutch authority over the areas they previously ruled over. The Malays sultans signed "political contracts" turning their kingdoms into now indirectly ruled "native states", while the other rulers signed "short contracts", acknowledging the incorporation of their kingdoms into the Dutch East Indies.

In 1909, the East Coast plantation region was designated an administrative region, with an advisory council. Medan was declared a municipality, with an advisory council, and in 1917 the same status was applied to Pematangsiantar, Binjei, Tebingtinggi and Tanjung Balai.

The East Coast Residency was divided into five regions (afdeeling), which comprised or contained a total of 34 "native states", which were autonomous to a degree as follows:

Afdeeling	Notes	Modern administrative regions
Langkat	same area as the Langkat sultanate	Langkat Regency, Binjai
Deli/Serdang	Deli and Serdang sultanates	Deli Serdang Regency, Serdang Bedagai Regency, Medan
Simalungun/Karoland	Batak region. Comprising Simalungun sub-region (five native states) and Karoland sub-region (five Karo kingdoms)	Karo Regency, Simalungun Regency, Pematangsiantar
Asahan	Comprising three sub-regions: Asahan (Asahan Sultanate), Batubara (five native states) and Labuhan Batu (four native states)	Asahan Regency, North Labuhan Batu Regency, Labuhan Batu Regency, South Labuhan Batu Regency, Tanjungbalai
Bengkalis	eliminated by boundary changes in 1938	Part of Riau province

The towns of Medan, Pematang Siantar, Tanjong Balai, Tebing Tinggi and Binjei were enclaves within the native states. The first two were governed by a mayor, and the latter three by the assistant resident.

In 1938, all ten residences on the island of Sumatra were brought together to form the Government of Sumatra, with Medan as its capital. The head of each residency was a resident. Under the resident, there were assistant residents, controllers and district administrators, who were responsible for the subdivisions of the residency.

== Population ==
Before 1863, when the first Europeans arrived, the region was populated by around 150,000 people, including a few thousand Malays in the lowlands. As labourers from outside the region were brought in to work on the plantations, the population grew rapidly. Initially these immigrant workers came directly from China, and from 1872, Java. In the late 1880s, the number of Chinese labourers brought in by the tobacco companies reached 20,000 per year. The work force on the coffee, rubber, tea and oil-palm plantations, which began to be planted in the late 1890s, was entirely ethnic Javanese. By 1930, the population had reached 1,693,200, nine times higher than that of 80 years previously. Between 1905 and 1930 alone, it trebled.

Sumatra East Coast Population
Year	Europeans	Natives	Chinese	Other "orientals"
1880	522	90,000	25,700	2,533
1900	2,079	306,035	103,768	9,208
1915	5,200	681,000	132,000	14,320
1930	11,079	1,470,395	192,822	18,904

By 1938, the "native" population was dominated by ethnic Javanese, mostly from central Java, followed by Bataks. There were also Banjar people from southern Borneo and Mandailing people from west Sumatra. Most of the "other orientals" were from China, but there were also Indians and Arabs. Most of the managers of the tobacco plantations and half the managers of the rubber, tea and oil plantations were Dutch, but there were also other Europeans and Americans. As of 1930, there were 275,233 Javanese and 26,703 Chinese plantation workers, and the original inhabitants were a minority.

== List of Residents of Sumatra's East Coast ==
No.	Portrait	Name	Took office	Left office	Note
1		S. Locker de Bruijne	1 June 1873	27 October 1877	
2		J. Faes	27 October 1877	12 January 1880	
3		L. de Scheemaker	12 January 1880	20 February 1881	
4		R.C. Kroesen	20 February 1881	12 June 1885	
5		A.A. Hoos	12 June 1885	9 October 1886	
6		G. A. Scherer	9 October 1886	22 February 1889	
7		W.J.M. Michielsen	22 February 1889	2 June 1894	
8		P. J. Kooreman	2 June 1894	4 April 1899	
9		H.A. van Steenstraten	4 April 1899	24 July 1902	
10		G. Schaap	24 July 1902	25 October 1905	
11		J. Ballot	25 October 1905	16 February 1910	
12		W.J. Rahder	16 February 1910	29 November 1913	
13		S. van der Plas	29 November 1913	12 August 1915	
1915–1938 under a governor
14		F.J. Bruggeman	30 December 1938	Japanese occupation	
