= Pardede =

Pardede is a Toba Batak clan originating in North Sumatra, Indonesia. People of this clan bear the clan's name as their surname. Notable people with this surname include:

- Abdul Halim Pardede (1886–1958), Indonesian cleric
- Peris Pardede (1918–1982), Indonesian politician
- Rudolf Pardede (1942–2023), Indonesian politician
- Urbanus Pardede (1903–?), Indonesian politician
