= Jong Sumatranen Bond =

Jong Sumatranen Bond was a Sumatran youth organization in the Dutch East Indies which existed from 1917 to 1931. It was connected with the Indonesian National Awakening and the rise of Indonesian nationalism.

== Background ==
Jong Sumatranen Bond (Young Sumatran Union) was founded on 9 December 1917 by around 90 students from Sumatra who met in Weltevreden as a result of attempt to unite student unions of STOVIA. The first president of JSB was Tengkoe Mansoer, son of the Sultan of Asahan, East Sumatra, who won against another prominent candidate Alinudin.

In August 1918, JSB had 419 members across branches in Medan, Padang, Bukittinggi in Sumatra, and in Batavia, Buitenzorg, Bandung, Serang, Sukabumi, Purworejo in Java.

JSB published a barely monthly magazine titled Jong Sumatra focusing on Sumatra's situation at that time, or even to a broader context such as Dutch East Indies or international world. Other topics of the magazine were women emancipation, poems, cultures, politics, and history. One of the main contributors of the magazine was Mohammad Yamin who wrote articles in Malay language.

JSB had only managed to run two congresses in its lifetime: (in Padang in 1919 and Buitenzorg in 1921).

JSB first congress was organized in Padang from 4 July to 6 July 1919. The organizers were Mohammad Amir, Bahder Djohan, and Mohammad Hatta. Even though organizing the event, Hatta could not attend because he was preparing for his departure to pursue his study in the Netherlands. President Mansyur could not attend the event since he was busy taking examination. The first day of the event was attended by around 3,000 guests including J. D. L. Le Febvre, resident of West Sumatra. Even though the second day attendances dropped significantly, JSB leaders were still pleased of the results of the congress. At the final day of the congress, the attendances were between 500-600 people.

Majority of its members were West Sumatrans. That sparked a bit discord among its members based on rassenwaan (racial delusion). Other conflict among its members were what school they attended called scholenwaan.

In July 1920, Mohammad Yamin composed official anthem of the organization titled "Tanah Air".

Hatta was elected treasurer from 1920 until August 1921. Bahder Djohan claimed when Hatta took office, the organization had debt of 1,000 gulden while at the end of his term, the organization had surplus of 700 gulden.

Amir's presidency ended in the second congress in Weltevreden, 24-25 December 1921 in which Yamin delivered speech on Malay language and literature for two and a half hours. Bahder Djohan succeeded as president of the organization.

In the end of 1925 the Batak students, who were minority and not really influential among the members, opted to create separate organization called Jong Bataks Bond (Young Bataks Union) led by Amir Sjarifudin.

In a meeting on 15 November 1925 between JSB, Jong Java, Jong Minahasa, and other organizations, there was an idea to organize the first congress of Indonesian youth. Bahder Djohan, Djamaludin Adinegoro, Sarbaini, and, Mohammad Yamin were sent as representatives of JSB to the organizing committee.

JSB cooperated with Perhimpunan Pelajar-Pelajar Indonesia (Indonesian Students Association) in September 1926 to unite students across Indonesia from different backgrounds into a single organization.

In 1927, president position changed from Yamin to Adnaan, a medical student of Stovia, born in Palembang.

At some point in history, Yamin became president again succeeding Adnaan.

On 17 February 1929, Jong Sumatranen Bond changed its name to Pemuda Sumatra (Sumatran Youth). In the same month, the leaders of the organization also decided to fuse to other youth organizations. On 23 April 1929, representatives of Pemuda Sumatera, Jong Java, Jong Celebes, and Pemuda Indonesia (Indonesian Youth) agreed to merge into one.

On new year's eve of 1931, along with Jong Java and three other youth organizations, JSB fused into one organization called Indonesia Moeda (Young Indonesia).

== Publication ==
JSB published a monthly magazine titled Jong Sumatra focusing on Sumatra's situation at that time, or even to a broader context such as Dutch East Indies or international world. Other topics of the magazine were women emancipation, poems, cultures, politics, and history. One of the main contributors of the magazine was Mohammad Yamin who wrote articles in Malay language.

Hatta contributed on economics and politics in an anti-Dutch views during his study in the Netherlands, with the aim of making his comrades in Dutch East Indies aware that there were flaws too in the western world which they admired.

Under presidency of Adnaan, in 1927 Jong Sumatra published more regularly than previous year. The main issue of the articles were exploitation of Sumatra by foreign investors.

Special edition of the magazine scheduled to be published as commemoration of tenth anniversary of the organization was never printed due to lack of funding, even though it was already announced.

In August 1928, the name of the magazine was changed to Pemoeda Soematera (Sumatran Youth). The last issue of magazine was published in December 1929, the fifth edition of the year of the supposed monthly publication.

Under presidency of Yamin, there was an attempt to publish another monthly publication called Malaya but it was never realized.

== Ideology ==
Even though majority of its members were Minangkabauan from West Sumatra with Islamic roots, the members were influenced by theosophical ideology and Hindu-Buddhism concepts. The organization itself was a moderate secular nationalist.

Moderate JSB members, and Islamist reformers, in West Sumatra had ideological opponent called kaum kuno (conservative people). The conservatives accused them, grouped under term kaum muda (young people) to destroy adat (customs) of Minangkabau, while the other sides accused the conservatives could not follow the modern time for being rigid and chauvinistic.

Despite the varying suku bangsa (nation-tribe), the members of JSB had commonalities: born in Sumatra, colonized by the Netherlands, and attended schools of Dutch curriculum. They imagined a nation called Sumatra.

== Affiliated organizations ==
Beside managing Jong Sumatra publication, JSB also initiated other affiliated organization such as Perserikatan Gadis Sumatera (Sumatran Girls' Association), which was founded on 11 November 1928, a scout organization named Pandu Pemuda Sumatera, and association football club named Sumatera Sepakat.

== Legacy ==
After the first congress, a monument commemorating the event was built in Padang. It was the first monument ever built for the youth movements of Indonesia.

== Presidents ==
- Tengkoe Mansoer
- Mohammad Amir
- Mohammad Yamin
- Adnaan

== Works cited ==
- van Miert, Hans (July 1996). "The 'Land of the Future': The Jong Sumatranen Bond (1917–1930) and Its Image of the Nation". Modern Asian Studies. 30 (3). Cambridge University Press: 591–616. doi:10.1017/S0026749X00016605. JSTOR 313022.
- Darmansyah; Misman (2010). Jong Sumatranen Bond: Perjuangan dalam Membangun Persatuan (1917–1931) (in Indonesian). Jakarta: Museum Sumpah Pemuda. ISBN 9789799899859.
