= Raya, Simalungun =

Raya
- Town
- Coordinates: 2°59′15″N 98°51′44″E
- Country: Indonesia
- Regency: Simalungun
- Province: North Sumatra

Raya, also known as the Municipality of Raya, is a town in North Sumatra province of Indonesia and it is the seat (capital) of Simalungun Regency.

== Climate ==
Pematang Raya has a tropical rainforest climate (Af) with heavy rainfall year-round. The temperatures are moderated by its elevation.

Climate data for Pematang Raya
Month	Jan	Feb	Mar	Apr	May	Jun	Jul	Aug	Sep	Oct	Nov	Dec	Year
Mean daily maximum °C (°F)	26.1 (79.0)	26.6 (79.9)	26.7 (80.1)	26.7 (80.1)	26.9 (80.4)	26.7 (80.1)	26.3 (79.3)	26.2 (79.2)	25.7 (78.3)	25.4 (77.7)	25.4 (77.7)	25.6 (78.1)	26.2 (79.2)
Daily mean °C (°F)	21.1 (70.0)	21.2 (70.2)	21.4 (70.5)	21.7 (71.1)	21.8 (71.2)	21.5 (70.7)	21.0 (69.8)	21.1 (70.0)	21.0 (69.8)	21.0 (69.8)	20.9 (69.6)	20.9 (69.6)	21.2 (70.2)
Mean daily minimum °C (°F)	16.1 (61.0)	15.9 (60.6)	16.2 (61.2)	16.7 (62.1)	16.7 (62.1)	16.3 (61.3)	15.8 (60.4)	16.0 (60.8)	16.3 (61.3)	16.6 (61.9)	16.5 (61.7)	16.3 (61.3)	16.3 (61.3)
Average rainfall mm (inches)	200 (7.9)	151 (5.9)	202 (8.0)	222 (8.7)	178 (7.0)	112 (4.4)	91 (3.6)	133 (5.2)	220 (8.7)	278 (10.9)	265 (10.4)	249 (9.8)	2,301 (90.5)
Source: Climate-Data.org
