= Dayang Bandir and Sandean Raja =

Simalungun folklore

Dayang Bandir and Sandean Raja is Simalungun folklore that located at Sumatera Utara. Dayang Bandir and Sandean Raja are brother and sister. Seven years after Dayang Bandir is born, their parents die. Dayang Bandir's and Sandean Raja's father is a king that ruled the eastern kingdom. They live with their uncle named Kareang. They have another uncle that ruled the western kingdom named Raja Soma. Sandean Raja is the successor of the eastern kingdom after his father died. But, Sandean Raja is too young to be a king. So Kareang replaces Sandean Raja's position until he is old enough to be king. Kareang is ambitious to be king but he needs eastern kingdom heirlooms to claim the king position from Sandean Raja. Dayang Bandir knows his uncle's ambition so she hides the eastern kingdom heirlooms. Kareang is really angry because of what Dayang Bandir has done. He takes Dayang Bandir and Sandean Raja to the forest and kills Dayang Bandir by hanging Dayang Bandir's body at a tree in the middle of the forest. After that, Kareang leaves the bodies of Dayang Bandir and Sandean Raja in forest. Sandean Raja succeeds in getting out from the forest and he goes to the western kingdom. In the western kingdom, Sandean Raja has been kept by Raja Soma. He marries Raja Soma's Daughter. After a few years, Sandean Raja attacks Kareang kingdom and ruled Eastern Kingdom and Western Kingdom.
