= Urbanus Pardede =

Indonesian communist politician

Regent of Simalungun
- In office 5 March 1946 – 9 April 1946
- President: Sukarno
- Governor: Teuku Muhammad Hasan
- Preceded by: Madja Purba
- Succeeded by: Madja Purba

Personal details
- Born: c. 1903 Simalungun Regency, North Sumatra, Dutch East Indies
- Died: Unknown
- Party: PKI

Urbanus Pardede (born c. 1903) was an Indonesian Communist and newspaper editor from Sumatra, active both in the Dutch East Indies and independence eras. During the years 1926–30, Dutch authorities arrested him without charge because of his Communist activities and exiled him to the Boven-Digoel concentration camp. He was also a key figure in the East Sumatra revolution of 1946 and became bupati of Simalungan Regency in the early independence era.

== Biography ==
Urbanus Pardede was born in around 1903, probably in the area of Simalungun Regency, North Sumatra, Dutch East Indies (now Indonesia). Little is known about his early life, but he was of Toba Batak background and seems to have received a Dutch-language education.

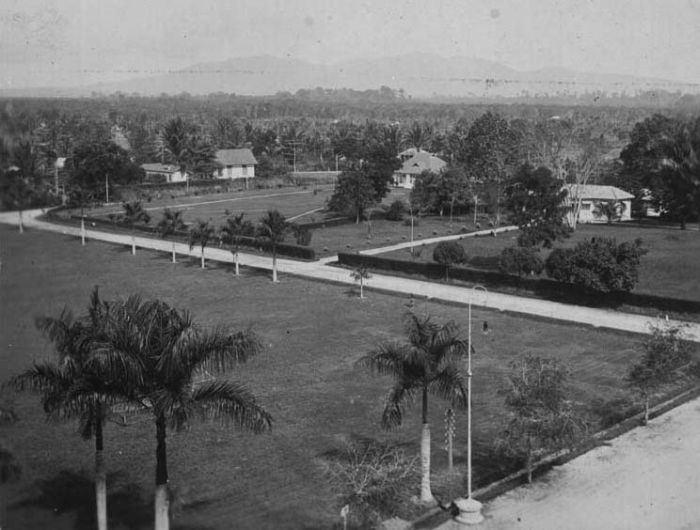
Pematangsiantar in 1923

At some point after the founding of the Communist Party of Indonesia (PKI) in 1920, Pardede joined it and became an active propagandist in Pematangsiantar. He became active as a newspaper editor at around that time, and worked at a paper called Pertjatoeran (discussion). He left that paper in 1925 to found a Malay language newspaper called Soeara Kita (our voice) with a co-editor named Mangkoeto Sulaiman. The newspaper was printed three times per week; some reports said it was a Communist paper whereas others described it as an Indonesian nationalist one with leftist leanings. The paper also announced itself as being intended for all races and not for one particular ethnic readership. Pardede became commissioner of the new subsection (Dutch: ondersectie) of the PKI there as well. According to later police reports, that subsection grew to have 3000 members by 1927. They escaped police detection for some time because communications only took place orally and they had no formal organizational structure. Finally in July 1927 Pardede and 8 co-conspirators were detained without charge by the police in Medan, on the accusation that he was planning a "terrorist" action among contract workers from more than 20 plantations in Simalungun Regency. After his arrest, the printing of the paper fell to the local Assistant Resident S. M. Simandjoentak. The paper was raided by police in 1927, who were searching for Communist materials; the new editorial board had to issue a statement that Pardede's communist activities had been a private matter unknown to them, and that the paper had not been involved and were merely nationalists. Soeara Kita ceased publication in mid-1927 due to lack of funds.

After months of imprisonment without charges, and pleading to be accused of crimes or released, Pardede and another prisoner unsuccessfully tried escaping from the Medan prison. In March 1928 a conservative Batak member of the Volksraad, Mangaradja Soangkoepon, asked the government why Pardede, his comrades and other Sumatran leftists had been arrested and jailed without charge, some since late 1926. The government soon decided on their case and added their names to the list of Communists being exiled to Boven-Digoel concentration camp in Papua. Nonetheless, even after he had already been deported, the issue made its way to the House of Representatives in the Netherlands where a committee examined the treatment of Pardede and those who had been detained with him in Medan. They determined that it was unsatisfactory according to Western legal norms that anyone should be imprisoned for more than six months without being interrogated, and referred the matter to the minister in charge for examination of causes and redresses for the injustices they had experienced. When news of the report made it back to the Indies, nationalists such as Abdoel Rivai publicized it as being typical of the injustice faced by Natives in the Indies.

In early 1929 there were news reports that a Batak woman, Pardede's unmarried partner, wanted to travel to Digoel to live with him. He seems to have convinced her not to; he sent a letter to his family that year announcing that he would be able to return in two months, although it would be at least another year before he actually could. In Digoel, he lived in the Tanah Merah camp.

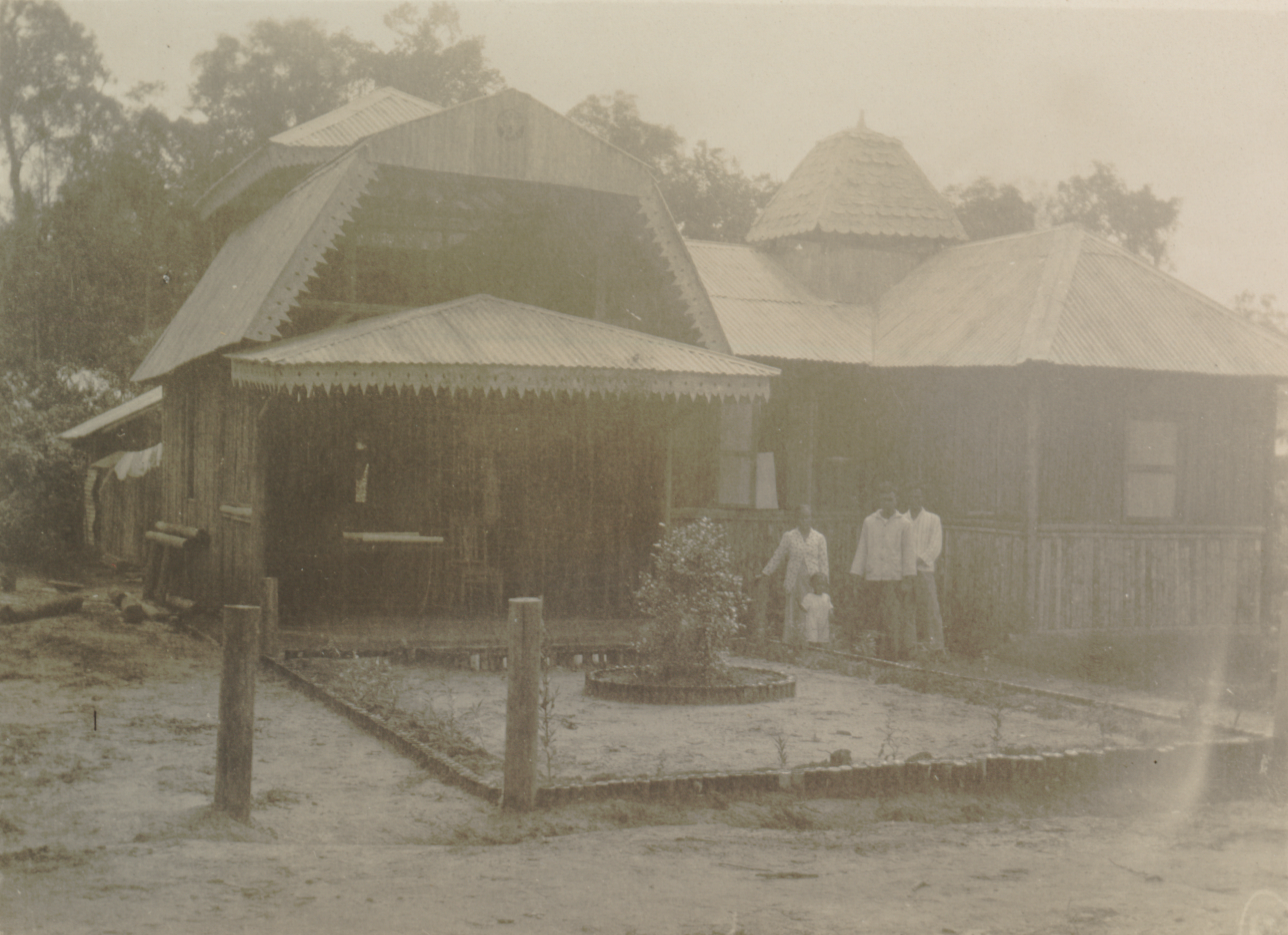
Internee's houses in the Tanahmerah camp at Boven-Digoel

In 1929 and 1930 the colonial government admitted it had detained far too many people and decided to give amnesty to hundreds of Boven-Digoel internees, including Pardede. Most of the released internees, including Pardede, were considered more cooperative by the Dutch and had not joined the rebellious faction of internees led by PKI leader Aliarcham. In addition, in the press it was observed that the lower level colonial officials in 1926 and 1927 had been under pressure to discover "dangerous communists" on short notice and may have rounded up people like Pardede without basis.

Upon his return to Sumatra, Pardede resumed his journalistic activities, heading a number of different publications throughout the 1930s. In 1932 he launched Berita Siantar (Siantar news), followed by Zaman Kita (our era) in 1933, both twice-weekly magazines published in Pematangsiantar. In the late 1930s, he was also director of a Batak weekly in Pematangsiantar called Oemoem (public), with I. M. S. Napitoepoeloe as editor-in-chief.

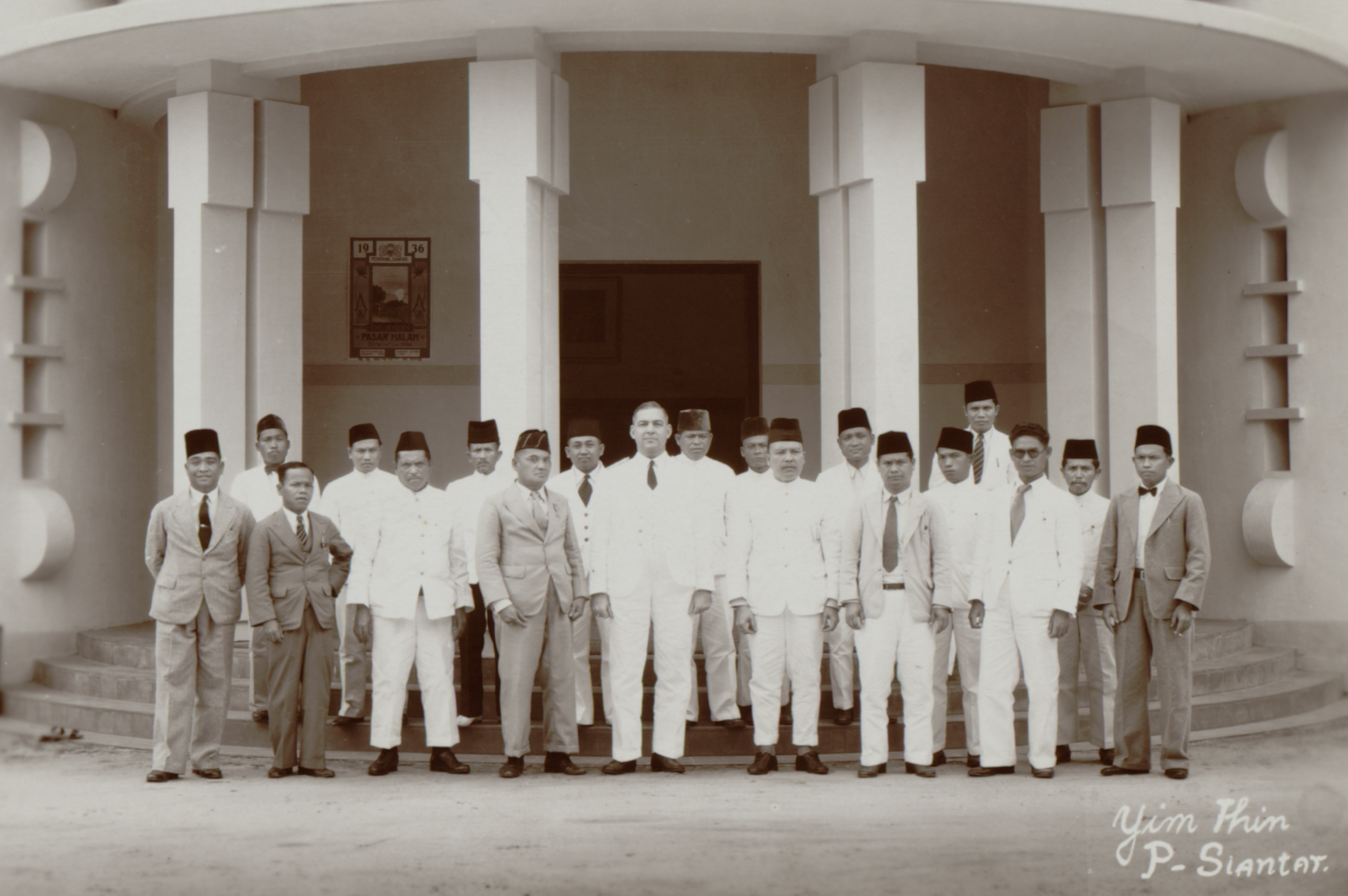
Officials and district heads gathered in Pematangsiantar, 1930s

Following the end of the Second World War, Pardede reemerged as a PKI figure in Sumatra. In the East Sumatra revolution in 1946 he joined a faction led by Luat Siregar. He was elected to represent the PKI in the provisional government there, eventually becoming a Bupati as the Indonesian Republic took control of the region. He also continued to be involved in worker organizing on plantations, as he had in the 1920s; in 1950 he was spokesperson for the Plantation Workers Union (Serikat Buruh Perkebunan, Kesatuan Buruh Perkebunan).

In 1955 he was active in advocating for the rehabilitation and proper treatment of ex-combatants by the Indonesian republic.
