= Sultanate of Langkat =

Malay Muslim state in Sumatra (1568–1946)

Coordinates: 3°54′41″N 98°25′29″E

Sultanate of Langkat Langkat Darul Aman كسلطانن لڠكت Kesultanan Langkat
- 1568–1946
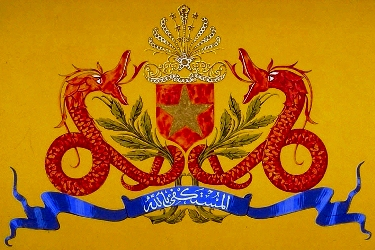
- Flag Coat of arms

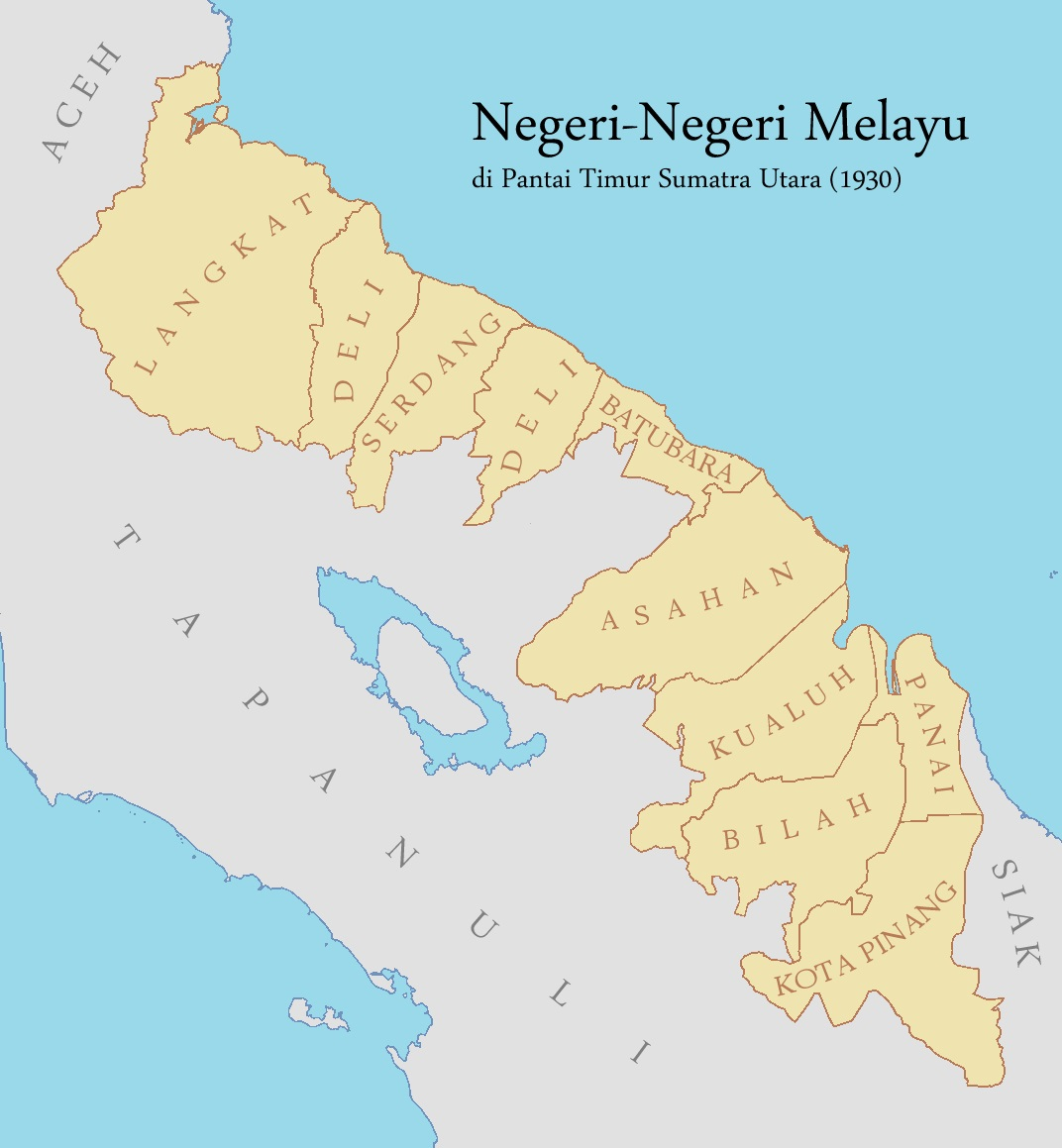
- Langkat Sultanate territory in 1930 (dark red)
- Capital: Tanjung Pura
- Common languages: Malay
- Religion: Islam (official)
- Government: Sultanate Monarchy
- Sultan
  - 1840-1893: Sultan Musa
  - 1893-1927: Sultan Abdul Aziz Abdul Jalil Rahmad Shah
  - 1927-1946: Sultan Mahmud Abdul Jalil Rahmad Shah
- History
  - Established: 1568
  - East Sumatra revolution: 1946
Preceded by	Succeeded by
Aceh Sultanate	Indonesia
- Today part of: Indonesia

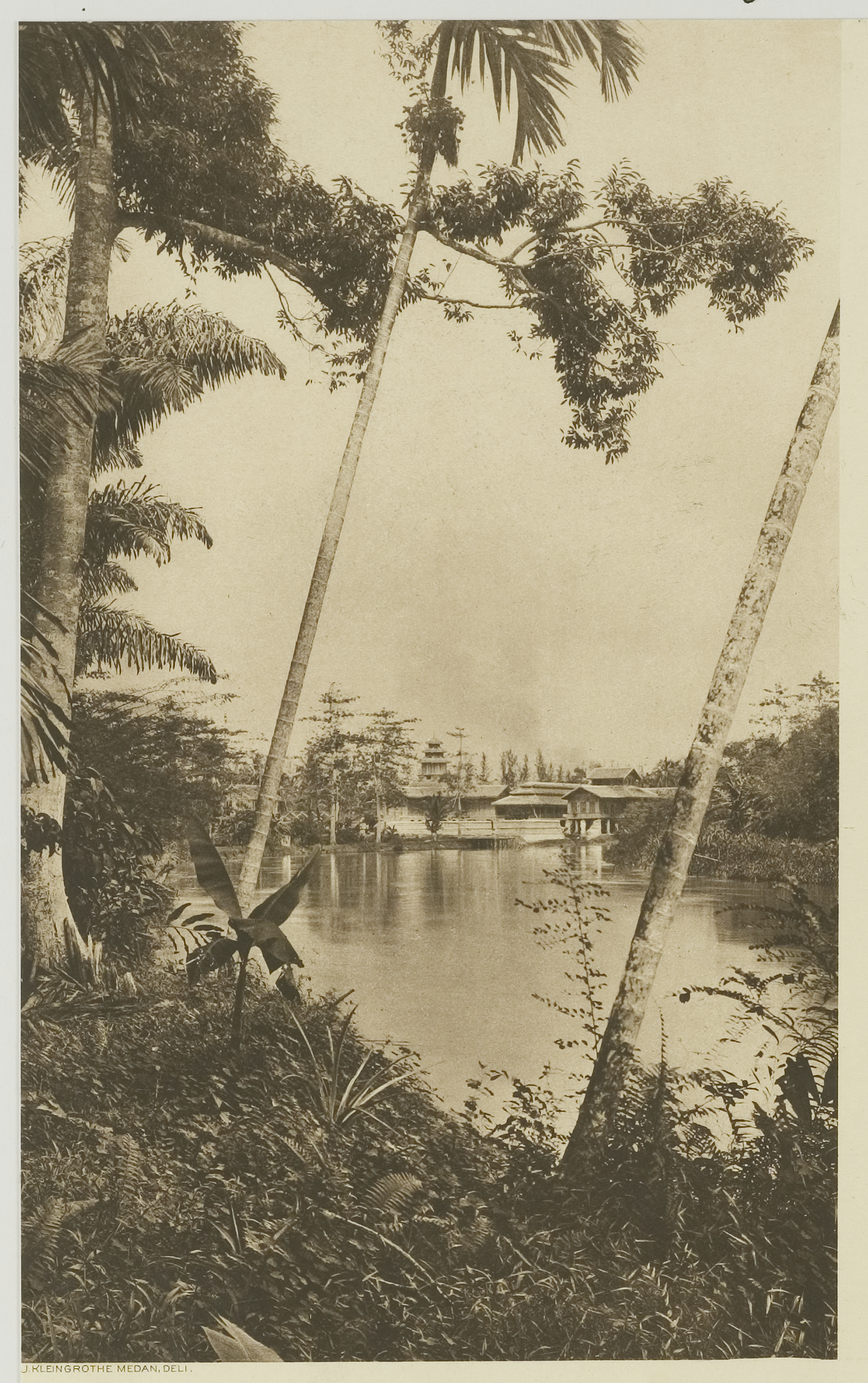
Langkat sultanate palace in 1905.

The Sultanate of Langkat (Malay: كسلطانن لڠكت) was a Malay Muslim kingdom located in modern Langkat Regency, North Sumatra. It managed to survive for almost 4 centuries until 1946. Its current location prospered with the opening of rubber plantations and the discovery of oil in Pangkalan Brandan.

== Early history ==
In approximately 1568, a military commander from the Kingdom of Aru set up a kingdom which was the forerunner of the modern Langkat Sultanate. However, the first sultan was Sri Paduka Tuanku Sultan al-Haj Musa al-Khalid al-Mahadiah Mu’azzam Shah, known as Sultan Musa, who was awarded the title of sultan in 1887 by the Dutch monarch, as were the rulers of Deli, Serdang and Asahan as a token of gratitude for their services to the Dutch East Indies. The Dutch colonial authorities were able to use the Malay sultans to indirectly control eastern Sumatra. These sultans signed political contracts with the Dutch, and as part of their nominal authority over land use, personally received royalties for each land concession they granted allowing foreign interests to control tobacco estates. They also were granted control over their Malay subjects and guaranteed security of their sultanates.

== Cooperation with the Dutch colonial authorities ==
The cooperative relationship with the Dutch made all the sultans enormously wealthy. As well as tobacco, contracts were also signed for oil exploitation, and by 1915, 37.9 percent of the income of the Langkat Sultanate passed directly to Sultan Abdul Aziz Abdul Jalil Rahmad Shah, the son of Sultan Musa, who had inherited the throne in 1893. Abdul Aziz also built the huge Azizi Mosque in Tanjung Pura, seat of the sultanate, and established a religious education centre.

Abdul Aziz was in turn succeeded by his son, Sultan Mahmud Abdul Jalil Rahmad Shah, whose wealth grew in parallel with the income from various concessions and royalties, particularly following the discovery of oil in Pangkalan Brandan. He became the richest of the Sumatra Malay sultans, and by 1933 owned 13 limousines, racehorses and a boat that he never used. The ethnic Malay subjects of the sultan - 18.57 percent of the population in 1930, each received 4 hectares - later reduced to 2.8 hectares - for farming. Despite this huge income, by the end of 1934 the extravagant lifestyle of Sultan Mahmud had resulted in him accumulating a huge debt. As a result, the Dutch took control of the finances of the East Sumatran sultans, arranging loans to pay off the debts, and leaving the sultans with monthly allowances. The cooperation with the Dutch extended to political activities, including the banning of the popular nationalist Partindo party in 1933 and the recall in 1935 of the sultan's nephew Amir Hamzah from his studies in Batavia because he had become too involved in the Indonesian independence movement. Amir Hamzah subsequently married the sultan's daughter, Kamailia.

== The end of the sultanate ==
The sultanate fell as a result of the social revolution of March 1946, a movement against what were seen as feudal and pro-Dutch aristocracies. The Sultanate of Langkat was declared abolished on 5 March. On 9 March, the palace was seized, seven aristocrats were killed and the sultan was handed over the republican authorities. He was released in July 1947 by Dutch forces who had launched a military offensive against the Republic of Indonesia. Mahmud Abdul died in April 1948.

== List of rulers ==
- 1568-1580: Panglima Dewa Shahdan
- 1580-1612: Panglima Dewa Sakti
- 1612-1673: Raja Kahar bin Panglima Dewa Sakdi
- 1673-1750: Bendahara Raja Badiuzzaman bin Raja Kahar
- 1750-1818: Raja Kejuruan Hitam (Tuah Hitam) bin Bendahara Raja Badiuzzaman
- 1818-1840: Raja Ahmad bin Raja Indra Bungsu
- 1840-1893: Tuanku Sultan Haji Musa al-Khalid al-Mahadiah Muazzam Shah (Tengku Ngah) bin Raja Ahmad
- 1893-1927: Tuanku Sultan Abdul Aziz Abdul Jalil Rakhmat Shah bin Sultan Haji Musa
- 1927-1948: Tuanku Sultan Mahmud Abdul Jalil Rakhmat Shah bin Sultan Abdul Aziz
- 2001-2003: Tengku Iskandar Hilali bin Tengku Murad Aziz, grandson of Sultan Abdul Aziz Abdul Jalil Rahmad Shah
- 2003-2026: Tengku Azwar bin Tengku Maimun, grandson of Sultan Abdul Aziz Abdul Jalil Rahmad Shah
- 2026-0000: Tuanku Sultan Ariefanda Abdul Jalil Rakhmat Shah

== Family tree ==
Family tree of Langkat Sultans
boxstyle_A10

Panglima; Dewa Shahdan^{(1)} r. 1568-1580
Panglima; Dewa Sakti^{(2)} r. 1580-1612
Raja Kahar^{(3)} r. 1612-1673
Bendahara Raja; Badiuzzaman^{(4)} r. 1673-1750
Raja Kejuruan; Hitam^{(5)} r. 1750-1818	Raja Indra; Bongsu
Raja Ahmad^{(6)} r. 1818-1840
Sultan Musa^{(7)} r. 1840-1893
Sultan; Abdul Aziz^{(8)} r. 1893-1927
Sultan Mahmud^{(9)} r. 1927-1948	Tengku Kamil	Tengku; Murad Aziz	Tengku Maimun
Tengku Atha'ar^{(10)} r. 1948-1990	Tengku Mustafa; Kamal Pasha^{(11)} r. 1990-1999	Tengku; Herman Shah^{(12)} r. 1999-2001	Tengku Iskandar; Hilali^{(13)} r. 2001-2003	Tengku Azwar^{(14)} r. 2003-2026

== See also ==
- Langkat
- Riau-Lingga
- Malay Indonesian

== Gallery ==
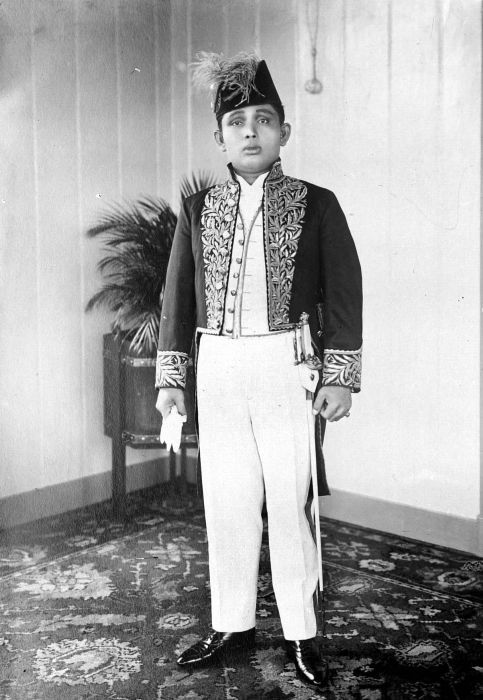
Sultan Mahmud Abdul Jalil Rahmad Shah (ruled from 1927 to 1946)

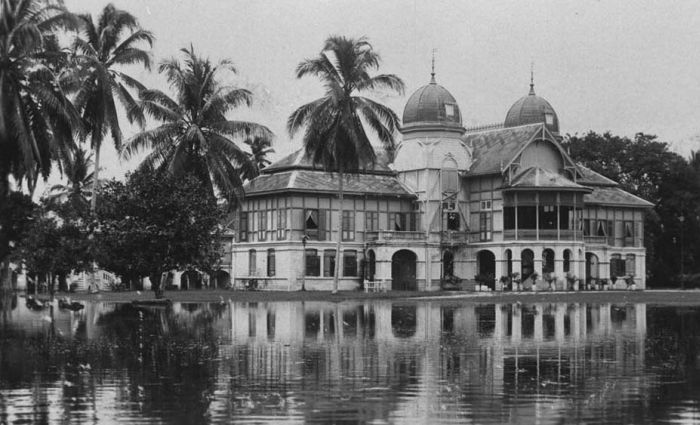
The Darul Aman Palace of the Langkat Sultanate, Tanjung Pura during a flood

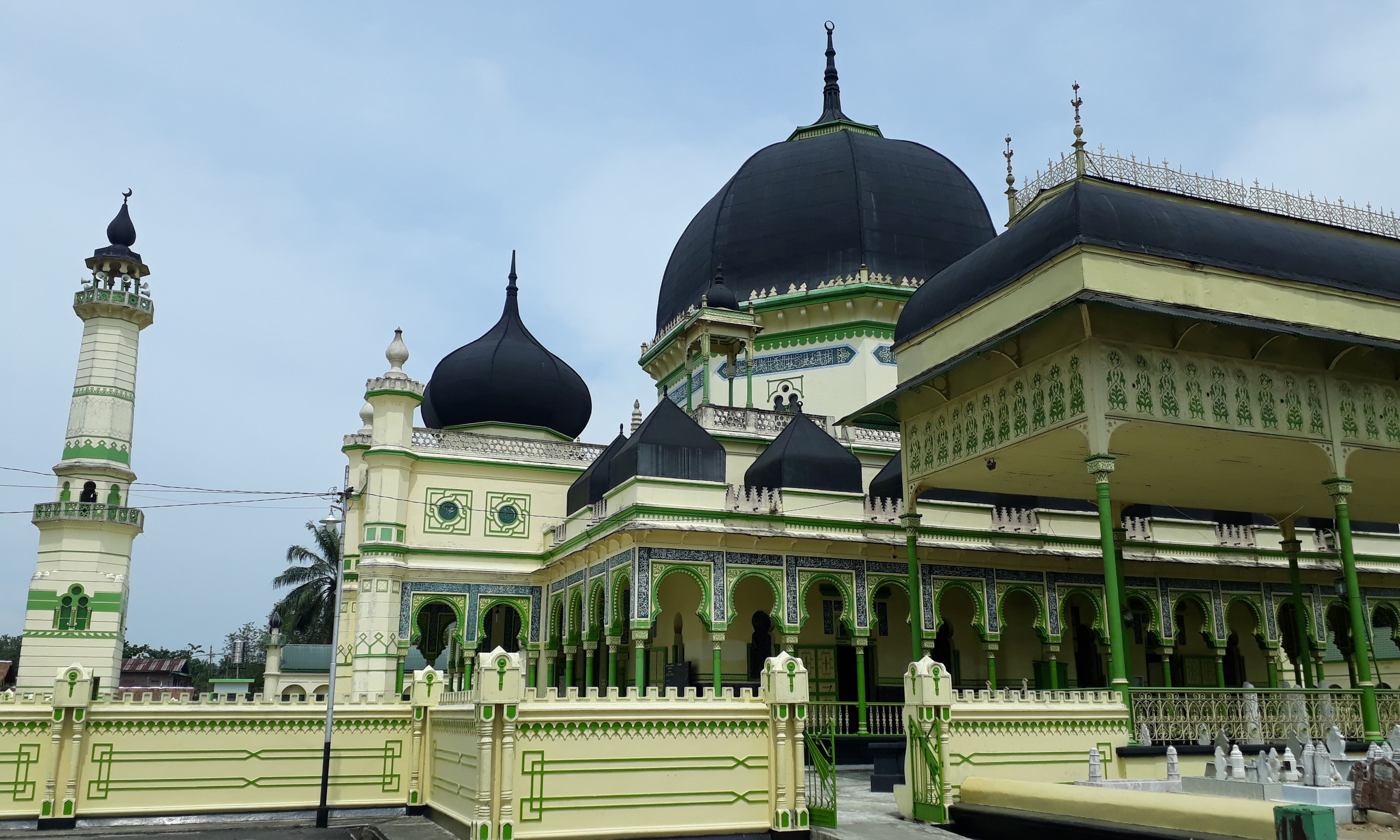
The Azizi Mosque, Tanjung Pura, Indonesia built by Sultan Abdul Aziz
