= Simalungun people =

Ethnic groups of North Sumatra, Indonesia

Simalungun people Batak Simalungun
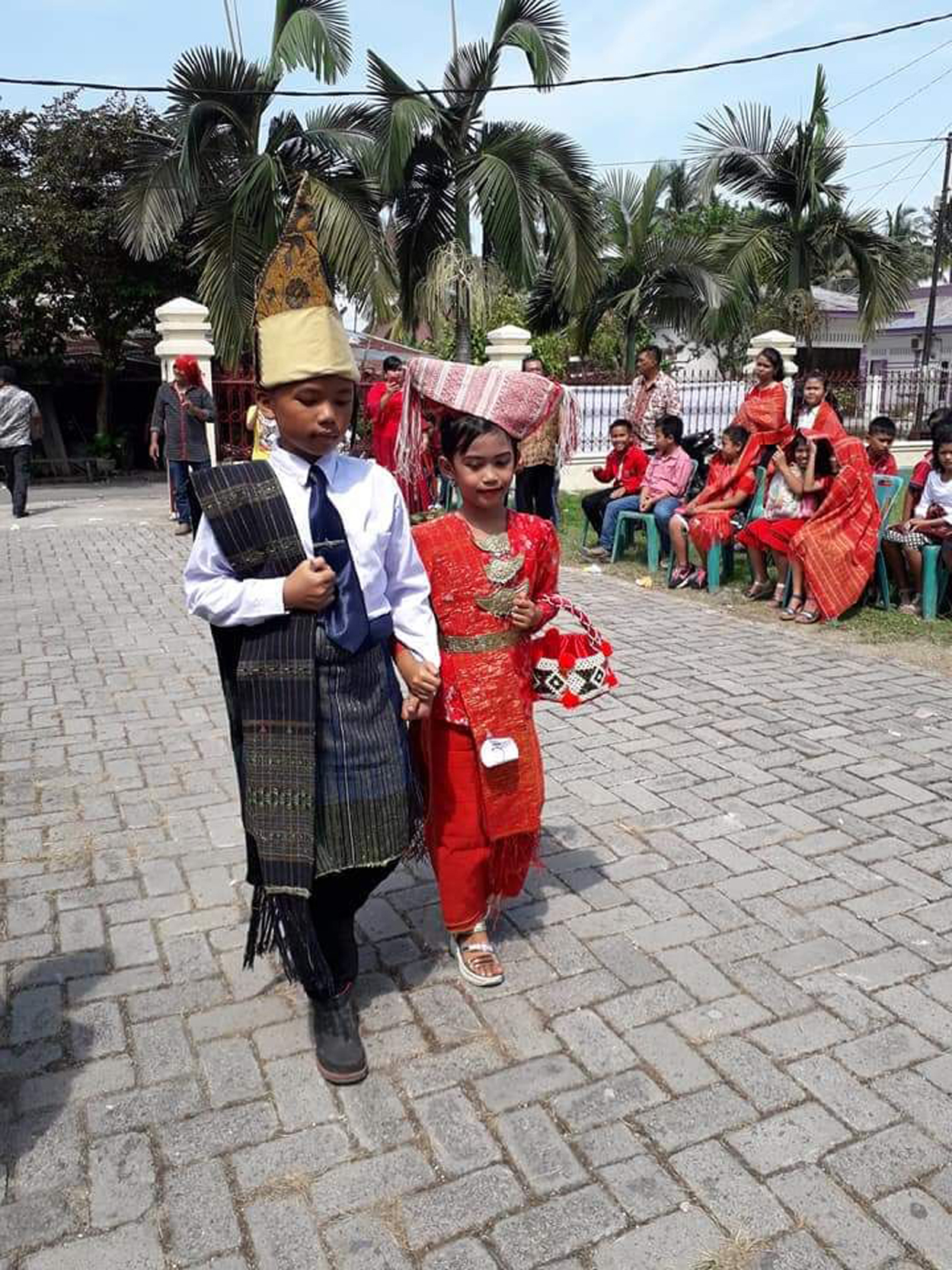
- A portrait of a boy and girl dressed in Simalungun traditional outfit.

Regions with significant populations
- Indonesia
- North Sumatra: 441,382 (2013)

Languages
- Simalungun, Toba Batak, Pardembanan Batak, Indonesian language

Religion
- Christianity 60%, Sunni Islam 39.3%, Animism

Related ethnic groups
- Toba Batak people, Karo people

The Simalungun (also known as Simalungun Batak) people are one of the sub-ethnic groups of the Batak people, found mainly in North Sumatra, Indonesia. They primarily live in Simalungun Regency and the surrounding areas, including the city of Pematang Siantar, an autonomous city, but previously part of Simalungun Regency.

The Simalungun live in the 'Eastern Batak' lands, bordering the lands of the Batak Toba to the south and west, and the Karo Batak to the north. Simalungun is linguistically closely related to Toba Batak, but culturally closest to Karo Batak. Both Batak groups migrated from Toba and Pakpak to participate in trade.

The Simalungun language is still spoken by many Simalungun people, in addition to Toba Batak and Indonesian.

== Traditional Simalungun life ==
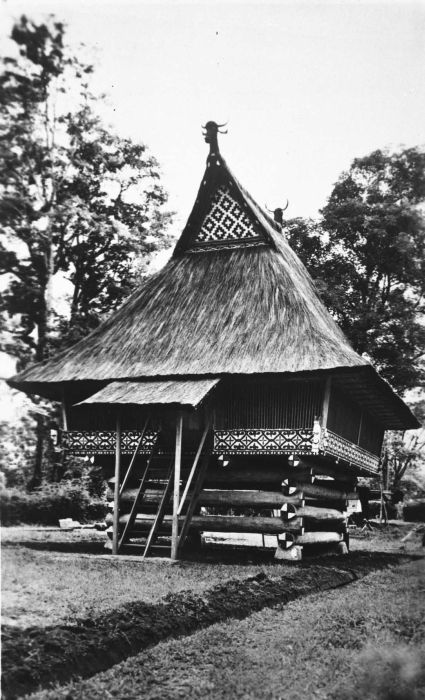
A Simalungun museum in Pematangsiantar, North Sumatra, Indonesia.

Long before Dutch colonialism was established in North-East Sumatra, people now known collectively as Batak Timur (Eastern Batak) claimed the area as their original homeland, for example, Sin Raya (Raya's peoples), Sin Silou (Silou's peoples), Sin Bandar (Bandar's peoples), and so forth. Dutch colonialism was first established in the Malay area of Deli (Medan) under "De Vide et impera" (the concept of Dutch political colonialism). The Batak Timur people were ruled by raja (kings), considered to be living gods. One by one their kingdoms capitulated to Dutch aggression and expansionism. The Dutch then gave a collective name to their new colonial area of the Eastern Batak kingdoms, that name being Simeloengoen. With the current Indonesian orthography, the name Simalungun is still used today, even among Eastern Batak people themselves.

The Simalungun people were ruled by raja (kings), considered to be living gods. G.L. Tichelman (1893–1962), a Dutch researcher, described Simalungun villages as consisting of houses built parallel to rivers from wooden poles and palm leaves. Houses could accommodate a single family (rumah parsatanggaan), or as many as twelve (rumah parrumahopattanggaan) with a designated area for each family within. The head of the village lived in the 'Rumah Bolon', the village's largest, most ornate house. The Head of Village was installed by, and loyal to The King. The main village or capital of each Kingdom was called 'Pematang.' Villagers drove out spirits from the village by holding 'Robu Tabu', days on which the village would be decorated and outsiders excluded from the village.

Villages would bathe in a communal 'tapian', with water piped through bamboo tubes for bathing. The Simalungun also used bamboo tubes to carry water back to the village. Religious ceremonies would often be held near the Tapian. 'Parsihili' were statues used to take an illness away from a person, while 'Pasiarhon' were statues used for communing with the dead. Although villagers would support victims of house fires, it was considered unlucky to offer them shelter for fear of further fires, and instead, a new house would be constructed communally as soon as possible.

It was considered inappropriate to bargain with family members, so an intermediary would be used when purchasing items from the family. Courtship was arranged in the marketplace using a betel nut. Girls wishing to avoid attention would give the nut to an old man, who would look after her during market day or would wear a hiou, to suggest unavailability.

The pounding of rice was an important activity, and the communal 'Losung', or rice block, was used for this activity, with a hole allocated for each family to use. A new losung would be cut from a tree trunk, and on an auspicious day decorated with flowers and transported into the village accompanied by music. A boy and girl dressed in ceremonial clothes would invest the new rice block by throwing rice over it, and the villagers would sing songs.

The birth of a child was an auspicious occasion, and the dukun (midwife/witch doctor) was appointed to drive off spirits and to cut the umbilical cord with a bamboo knife. The newborn baby would be swaddled and daubed with rice chewed by the dukun before the mother commencing breastfeeding. The placenta would be buried under the house and for seven nights a fire would be maintained to drive off spirits.

On the seventh day, the child would be brought to the tapian. If the date of birth was an auspicious one, this would be done using the mother a new hiou, a ragi idup, or ragi panei [ceremonial cloths], but if the date was a bad one, the baby would be carefully brought by all the women of the village, who would set out to deceive the evil spirits to protect the baby. When the child was named, it would be given black, white, and red bracelets for protective purposes.

A well-preserved traditional Simalungun village can be seen at Pematang Purba.

== Simalungun people ==
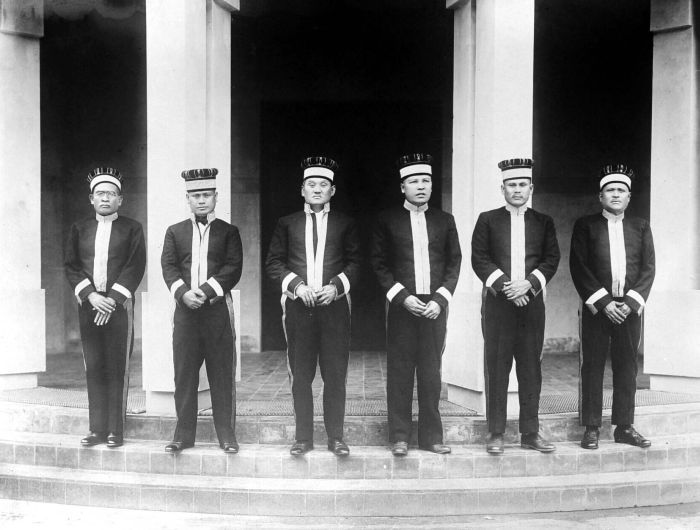
Heads of Simalungun in East Coast Sumatra.

The concept of a cohesive Simalungun people is derived in part from Dutch colonialism. In 1870 the Dutch established the Residency of East Sumatra, centred on Medan in the Sultanate of Deli. In 1904 the Netherlands East Indies government signed surrender agreements with the seven kingdoms of the 'Simeloengoenlanden', to form the administrative unit Simeloengoen en Karolanden. These seven Simalungun kingdoms were the kingdoms of Siantar, Tanoh Jawa, Panei, Dolok Silou, Raya, Purba, and Silimahuta. It has been suggested that Tanoh Jawa had more in common with early pagan Asahan (later to become the Asahan Sultanate) than it did with the other Simalungun kingdoms.

The colonial seat was established in 1908 at Pematang Siantar. The Dutch colonial system encouraged migration, especially of non-simalungun labourers working on Dutch plantations, with both peoples bringing new influences to the area. After World War II, in 1946, a social revolution occurred in East Sumatra which is viewed as a tragedy by the Simalungun people. Non-native settlers in East Sumatra demanded changes to the monarchy systems of Deli, Karo, and Simalungun, and agitated for unity with the new government which had been proclaimed as the Republic Of Indonesia in August 1945. Many were kidnapped and killed, especially from the royal families of each Kingdom. The monarchy system in East Sumatra was deposed and, while the families are still intact and acknowledged by the Simalungun people as such among themselves, the titles are now entirely ceremonial within the Simalungun cultures.

== Religion ==
Religion of Simalungun People
1. Protestantism (54.9%)
2. Catholicism (5.00%)
3. Sunni Islam (39.3%)
4. Animism and others (0.80%)

August Theis, a German missionary arrived in Sumatra in 1902. He was subject to Ludwig Ingwer Nommensen, who instructed him to head to the Simalungun region. They arrived on 2 September 1903, a day now commemorated by the Simalungun church. This opened several schools and returned to the Netherlands in 1921.

The first translation of The Bible into an indigenous Indonesian language was by Wismar Djaulung Saragih Sumbayak, who had been baptised by Theis in 1910. Wismar also authored the first Simalungun dictionary and successfully campaigned for teaching in schools to be conducted in Simalungun rather than Toba. He also pushed for the use of traditional Simalungun clothes and music in the church. His efforts eventually led to the formation of the distinct Simalungun Protestant Christian Church.

== Language ==
Simalungun has a regional language that is different from Indonesian language but closely related to Toba Batak language called Batak Simalungun language. Apart from that, the Simalungun Batak who have mixed with the Malays and have Malay customs, some of them still speak the Pardembanan Batak language, a branch of the Simalungun Batak or Toba Batak language which is influenced by Malay language.

== Simalungun clans ==
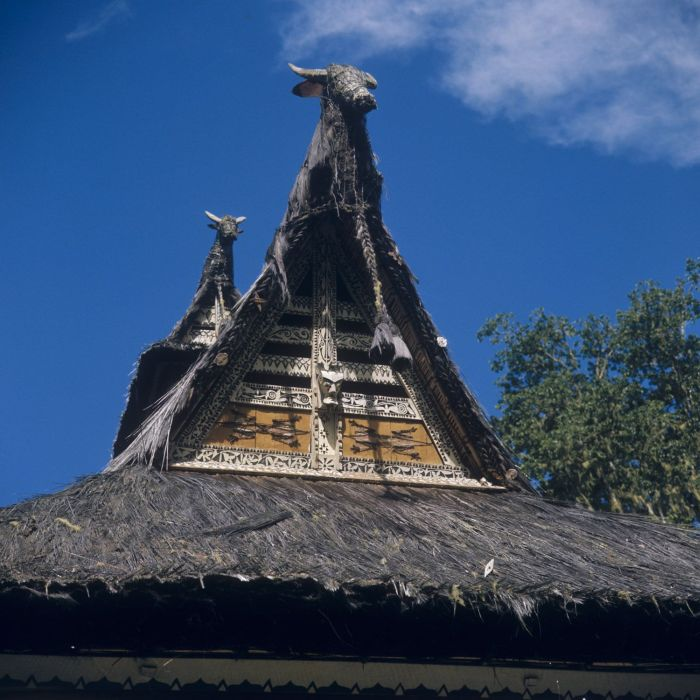
Roof of a rumah bolon, the house of a Simalungun Batak raja and his family.

Simalungun people belong to one of four clans. People of each clan bear the name of the clan as their surnames. Each clan has subclans, although individuals may choose to identify primarily by their clan's name, rather than subclan's name, to emphasize common kinship.

The four original surnames are:-

- Saragih
- Damanik
- Purba
- Sinaga

== Notable people ==
- Saktiawan Sinaga
- Bill Saragih
- Jeka Saragih

== Gallery ==
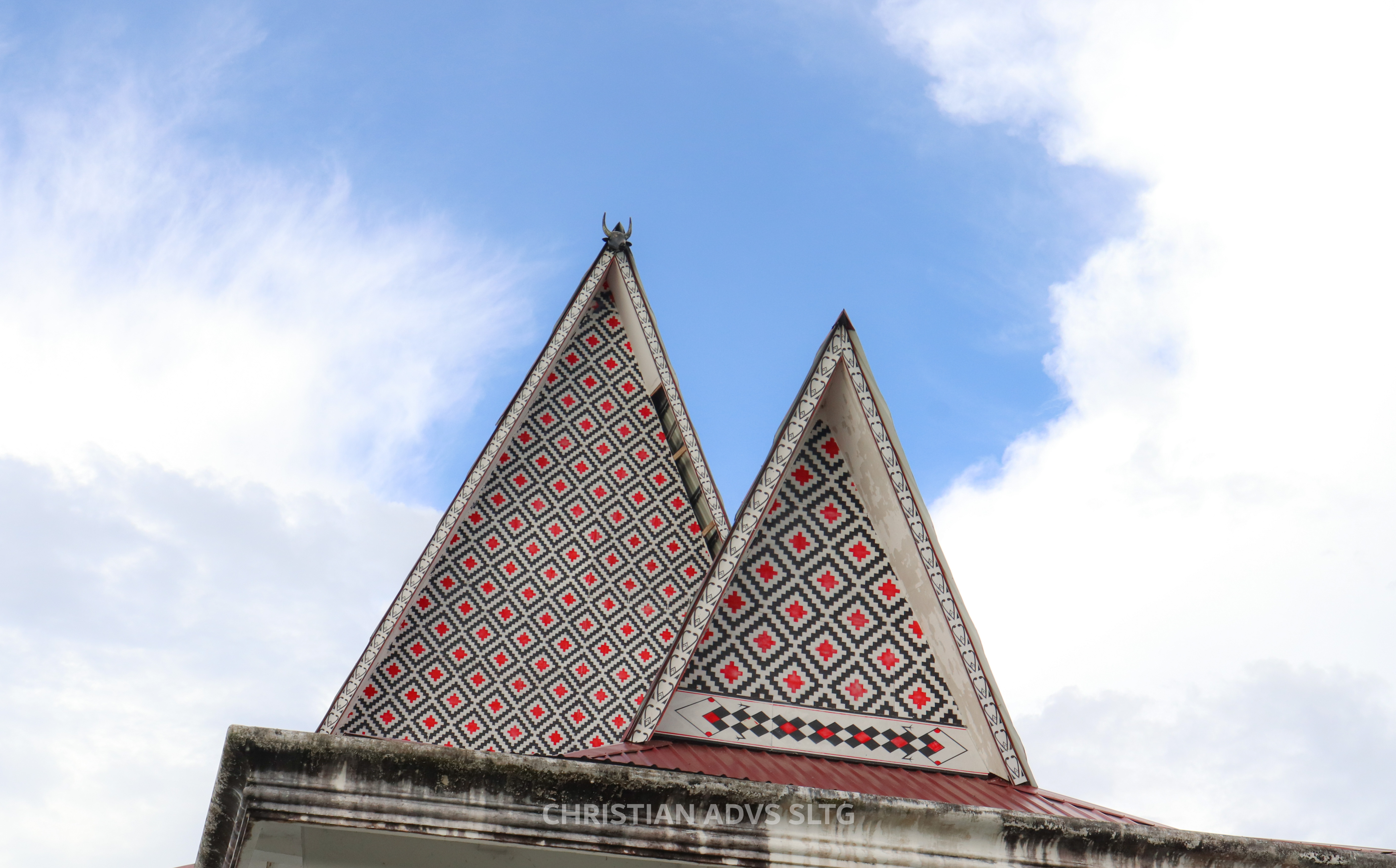
Several pinar motifs (traditional Simalungun ornaments) on the Simalungun Regency DPRD building

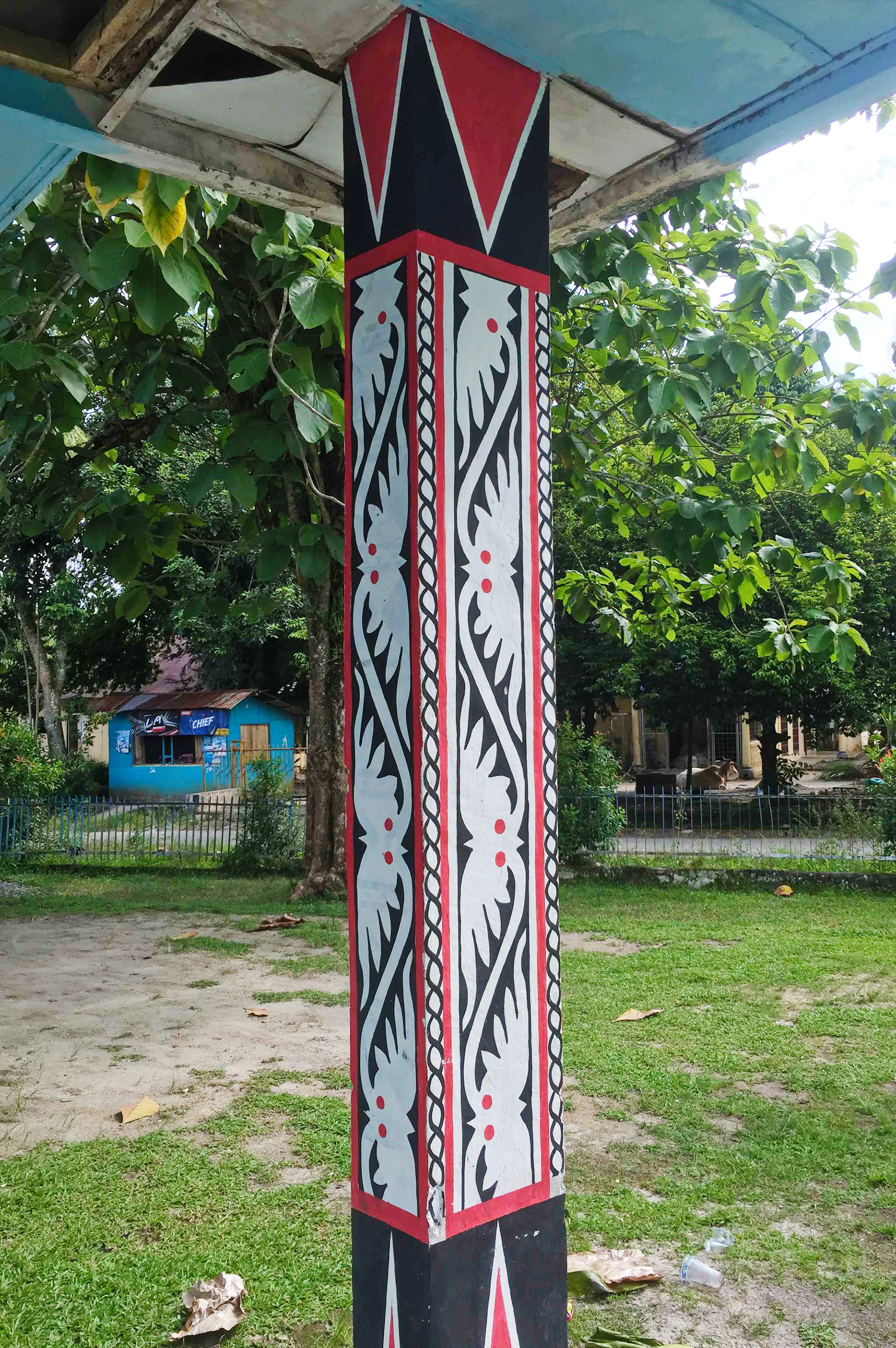
Pinar Apulapul, one of the traditional Simalungun ornamental motifs.

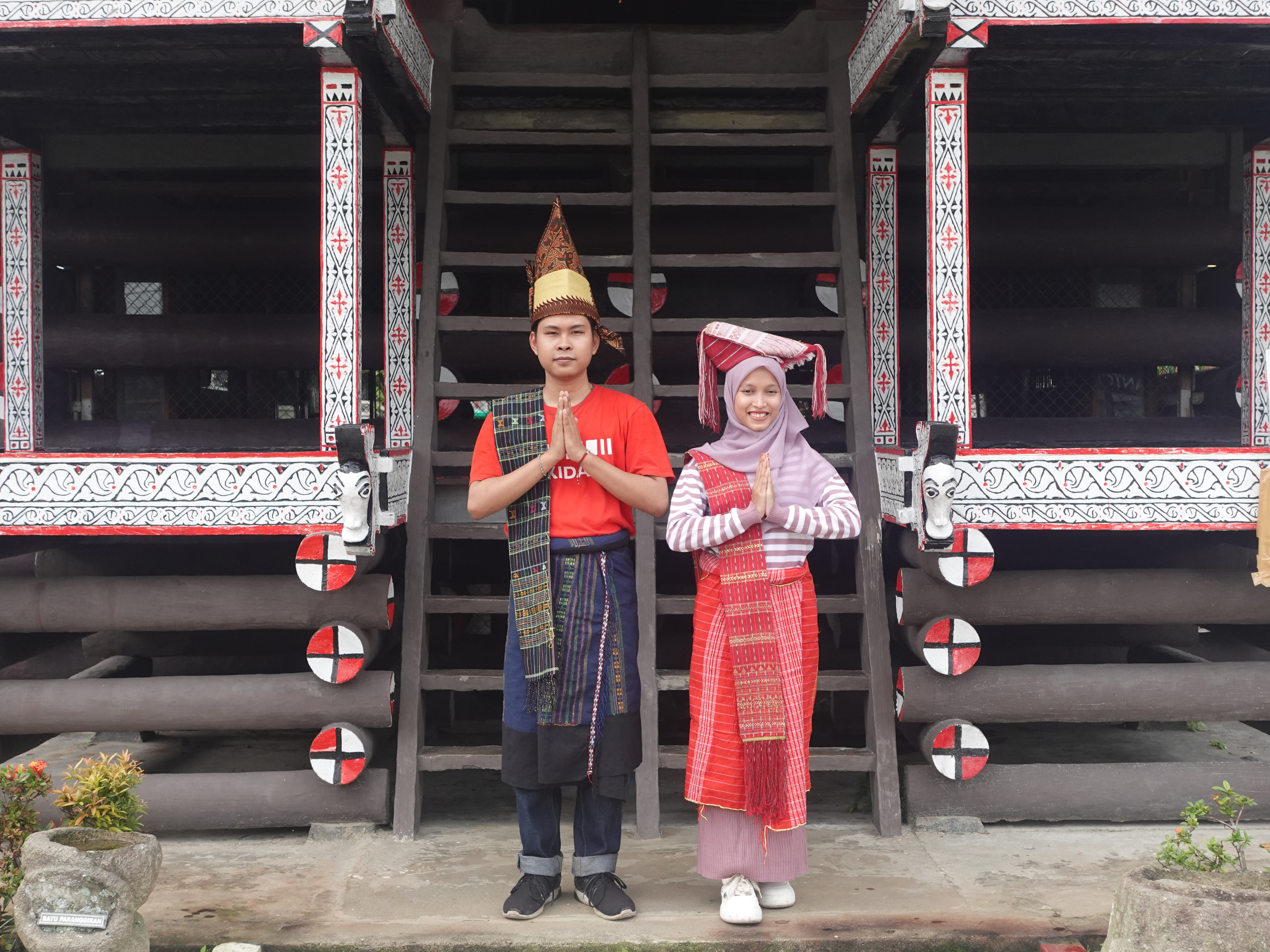
The traditional Simalungun Batak fabric is called hiou, the head covering for men is called gotong, the head covering for women is called bulang, while the fabric worn around the waist or side cloth is called surisuri.
