= Asahan Sultanate =

Sultanate in Sumatra in Indonesia

Kesultanan Negeri Asahan كسلطانن اسهن
- 1630–1946
- Flag

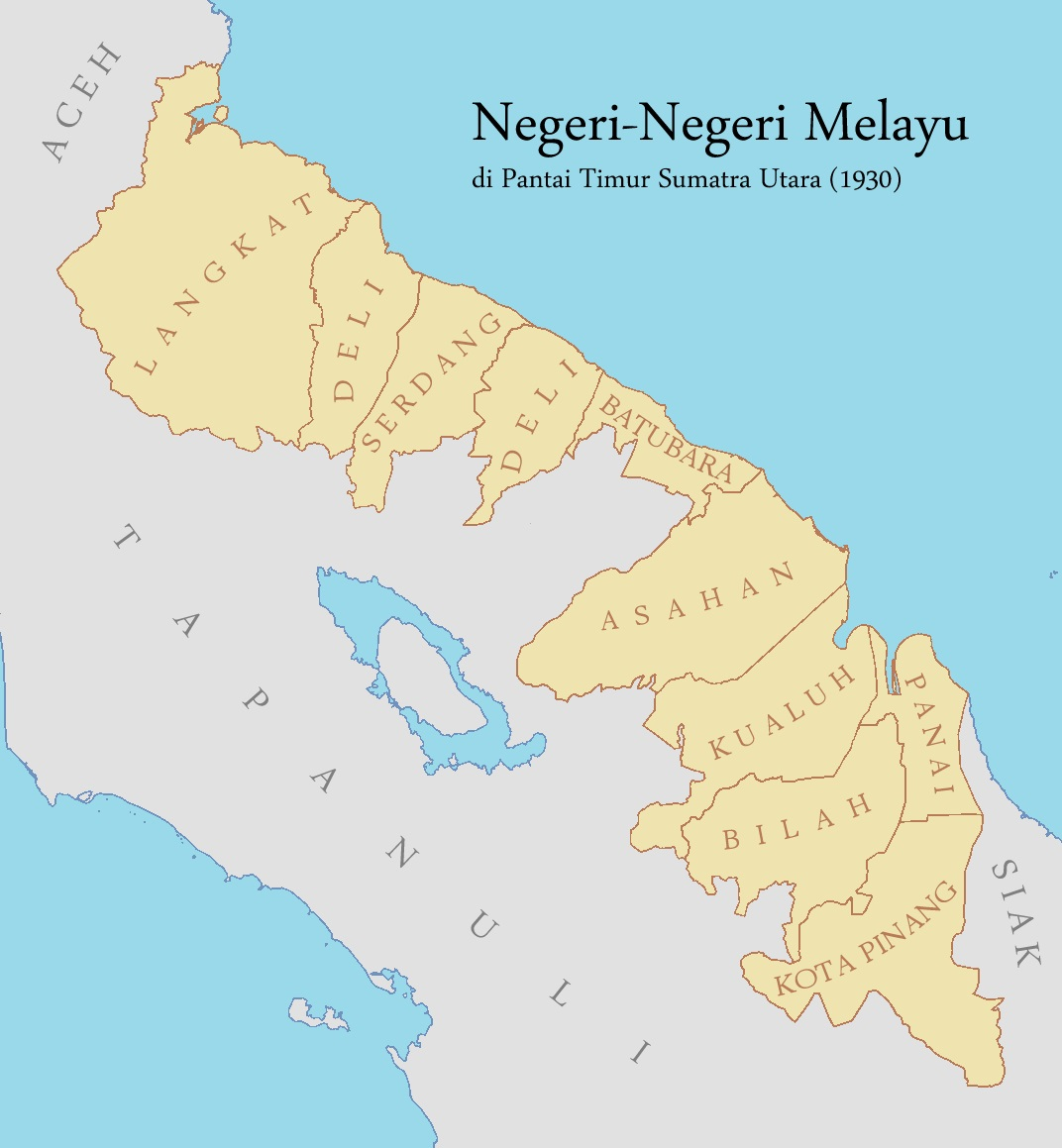
- The territory of the Sultanate of Asahan in 1930 (green)
- Status: Princely state under Asahan Afdeling within Sumatra's East Coast Residency
- Capital: Tanjung Balai; 3°00′00″N 99°10′00″E
- Common languages: Malay
- Religion: Islam
- Government: Monarchy Sultanate
- Sultan
  - 1630: Raja Abdul Jalil I
  - 1915-1980: Sultan Shaibun Abdul Jalil Rahmad Shah III
  - 1980-Now: Sultan Kamal Abraham Abdul Jalil Rahmad Shah
- History
  - Established: 1630
  - East Sumatra revolution: 1946
Preceded by	Succeeded by
Sultanate of Aceh	Indonesia
- Today part of: Indonesia

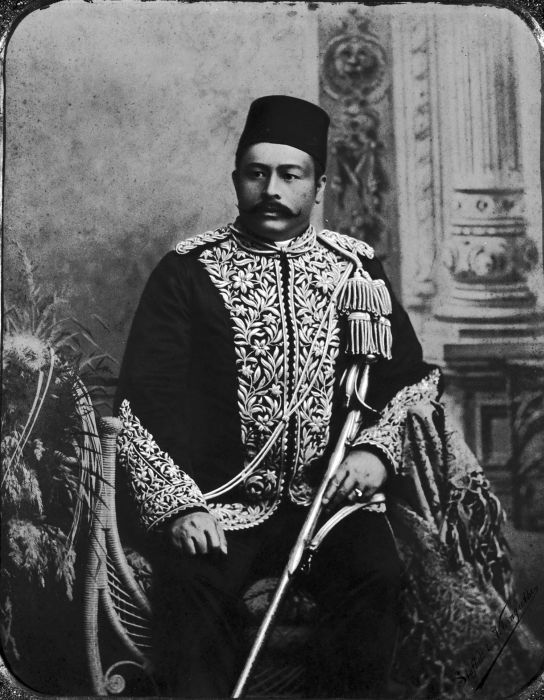
Sultan Muhammad Husain Rahmad Shah II (reign 1888–1915).

The Sultanate of Asahan (كسلطانن اسهن) was a Malay sultanate from approximately 1630 until 1946. It was located in the north-east of the island of Sumatra, in what is now Indonesia and covered what is now the Asahan Regency.

== History ==
The sultanate was founded around 1630 by Rajah Abdul Jalil, the son of Sultan Iskandar Muda of Aceh. Asahan remained indebted to Aceh until the beginning of the 19th century. After this, it declared itself independent under Sultan Muhammad Husain Rahmad Shah. During his 46-year rule, more and more trade was conducted with Europeans and this led to an agreement with the government of the Dutch East Indies.

At his death in 1859, there were difficulties with the succession. The successors had problems with the Dutch authority in Batavia and this led to the relocation of the capital to the interior of the country. The Dutch intervened several times in the succession of the Sultans. The last ruler was Sultan Shaibun Abdul Jalil Rahmad Shah who succeeded his father in 1915. At the end of the Second World War, the sultanate was not restored to its former glory but incorporated into the new republic of Indonesia.

== Socio-cultural ==
As an empire under the influence of Islamic culture, Asahan also developed a strong religious life. The religious scholar Abdul Hamid was born in 1880 (1298 H), and died on 18 February 1951(10 Rabiul Awal 1370 H). Datuk, his grandmother and father came from Talu, Minangkabau. Sheikh Abdul Hamid studied religion in Mecca and was highly respected by the scholars of that era.

The students of Sheikh Abdul Hamid later founded the Jamiyyatul Washliyyah organization, based on Sunni schools and Shafi'i schools. In many ways, this organization has similarities with the Tarbiyah Islamiyah Association (PERTI) which was founded by Minangkabau scholars. The existence of many of these similarities, because indeed the scholars were friendly to each other since they studied in Mecca. The views of these religious leaders are very different from the reformist ideas brought by young Minangkabau scholars, such as Dr. Haji Abdul Karim Amrullah. Therefore, there is often a polemic between the followers of these two different understandings.

In the first half of the 20th century, around 1916, a school called Madrasah Ulumul Arabiyyah was founded in Asahan. As the first director, Sheikh Abdul Hamid was appointed. In its journey, the Ulumul Arabiyah madrasa later developed into one of the important centers of Islamic education in Asahan, even including the well-known madrasa in North Sumatra, comparable to the Stabat, Langkat Islamic Madrasa, Madrasah Islam Binjai and Madrasah al-Hasaniyah Medan. Among the well-known scholars graduating from this Asahan school was Sheikh Muhammad Arsyad Thalib Lubis (1908-1972).

== Family tree ==
House of Meukuta Alam

Raja Abdul; Jalil Shah I^{(1)} r. 1630–?
Raja Said; Shah^{(2)} r. 1600s–1700s
Raja; Muhammad; Mahrum Shah^{(3)} r. 1700s–1760
Raja Abdul; Jalil Shah II^{(4)} r. 1760–1765
Raja Dewa; Shah^{(5)} r. 1765–1805
Raja Said; Musa Shah^{(6)} r. 1805–1808	Raja; Muhammad; Ali Shah^{(7)} r. 1808–1813
Sultan; Muhammad; Husain Rahmad; Shah I^{(8)} r. 1813–1859
Sultan; Ahmad Shah^{(9)} r. 1859–1888	Tengku; Muhammad; Adil
Sultan; Muhammad; Husain Rahmad; Shah II^{(10)} r. 1888–1915
Sultan; Shaibun Abdul; Jalil Rahmad; Shah III^{(10)} r. 1915–1980
Sultan; Kamal Abraham; Abdul Jalil; Rahmad Shah^{(11)} r. 1980–present

== See also ==
- Sultanate of Deli
- Sultanate of Langkat
- Sultanate of Serdang
- Sultanate of Siak Sri Indrapura
- Sultanate of Bulungan
- Jambi Sultanate
- Palembang Sultanate
- Riau-Lingga Sultanate
- Kingdom of Kaimana
