= Simalungun Regency =

Regency in North Sumatra, Indonesia

Coordinates: 2.9000°N 99.0000°E

Simalungun Regency Kabupaten Simalungun
- Regency
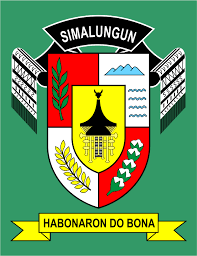
- Coat of arms
- Motto: Habonaron Do Bona (Truth is the Foundation of Everything)
- Country: Indonesia
- Province: North Sumatra
- Regency seat: Raya

Government
  - Regent: Anton Achmad Saragih
  - Vice Regent: Benny Gusman Sinaga
  - Chairman of Regency's Council of Representatives: Timbul Jaya Hamonangan Sibarani (Golkar)
  - Vice Chairmen of Regency's Council of Representatives: Samrin Girsang (PDI-P), Elias Barus (Partai Demokrat) and Sastra Joyo Sirait (Gerindra)

Area
  - Total: 4,372.5 km^{2} (1,688.2 sq mi)

Population (mid 2025 estimate)
  - Total: 955,629
  - Density: 218.55/km^{2} (566.05/sq mi)
- Time zone: UTC+7 (WIB)
- Website: www.simalungunkab.go.id

Simalungun Regency is a regency in North Sumatra Province of Indonesia. Its seat was formerly at Pematangsiantar, but this city was under Law No.15 of 10 March 1986 was separated from the Regency and made into an independent city (kota), although it remains geographically surrounded by the regency, whose new administrative seat is at Raya, while the regency's two most populous districts are Bandar (the centre of the Bandar urban area) and Siantar (essentially the eastern suburbs of Pematangsiantar city). The regency now covers an area of 4,372.5 square kilometres, and at the 2010 census it had a population of 817,720; at the 2020 Census this had risen to 990,246, but as of mid 2025 this was estimated to have declined to 955,620 (comprising 476,355 males and 479,265 females).

== Demography ==
The principal group of inhabitants of the Regency (and of Pematangsiantar city, an enclave within the regency) are the Simalungun people, a sub-group of the Batak people. Their language (Simalungun language) is an Austronesian language.

== Regent ==
The regent of Simalungun is Radiapoh Hasiholan Sinaga, SH, who was elected as Regent of Simalungun on Pilkada (election of regional head) 2020, and took office on 21 April 2021.

== Adjoining administrative entities ==
- North: Serdang Bedagai Regency and Deli Serdang Regency.
- East: Batubara Regency and Asahan Regency.
- South: Toba Regency.
- West: Karo Regency and Lake Toba.

== Administrative districts ==
The regency in 2010 was divided administratively into thirty-one districts (kecamatan), but in 2017 a 32nd district - Dolog Masagal - was created from parts of Raya District and Dolok Pardamean District. These are tabulated below with their areas and their populations at the 2010 Census and 2020 Census, together with the official estimates as of mid 2025. For ease of location these are grouped into three geographical sectors, which have no administrative significance. The table also includes the locations of the district administrative centres, the number of administrative villages in each district (totaling 386 rural desa and 27 urban kelurahan), and its post code.

Kode Wilayah	Name of District (kecamatan)	Area in km^{2}	Pop'n Census 2010	Pop'n Census 2020	Pop'n Estimate mid 2025	Admin centre	No. of villages	Post code
12.08.25	Silimahuta	74.16	13,611	17,479	17,186	Saribu Dolok	7 ^{(a)}	21169
12.08.31	Pematang Silimahuta	79.68	10,334	13,390	13,126	Tiga Raja ^{(b)}	10	21167
12.08.14	Purba	172.71	21,830	27,536	28,672	Tiga Runggu	14 ^{(a)}	21166
12.08.15	Haranggaol Horison	40.97	4,994	7,041	6,164	Haranggaol	5 ^{(a)}	21177
12.08.20	Dolok Pardamean	67.90	16,008	15,136	14,878	Dolok Pardamean	11	21163
12.08.09	Sidamanik	80.88	26,953	30,853	28,392	Sari Matondang	15 ^{(a)}	21171
12.08.10	Pematang Sidamanik	137.80	16,283	19,716	19,229	Sait Buttu Saribu	10 ^{(a)}	21188
12.08.04	Panei	77.96	21,425	28,326	26,425	Panei	17 ^{(a)}	21161
12.08.05	Panombean Panei	73.74	19,193	24,993	23,835	Pematang Panombean	11	21165
12.08.29	Raya	261.56	30,876	30,150	30,797	Pematan Raya	17 ^{(c)}	21160
12.08.32	Dolog Masagal	105.77	^{(d)}	13,406	13,301	Bah Bolon	10	21164
12.08.26	Dolok Silau	302.66	13,716	17,696	17,592	Saran Padang	14	21168
12.08.27	Silau Kahean	228.74	17,000	19,477	19,424	Negeri Dolok	16	21157
12.08.07	Raya Kahean	204.89	17,398	21,583	19,918	Sindar Raya	14 ^{(a)}	21156
Sub-totals	Western sector	1,909.06	233,721	286,782	278,939		176	
12.08.28	Tapian Dolok	119.89	38,034	45,032	44,054	Sinaksak	11 ^{(a)}	21154
12.08.17	Dolok Batu Nanggar	106.91	39,364	45,659	44,477	Serbelawan	16 ^{(e)}	21155
12.08.01	Siantar ^{(f)}	73.99	62,916	73,536	68,037	Dolok Marlawan	17	21151
12.08.02	Gunung Malela	96.74	32,676	41,189	39,261	Dolok Malela	16	21175
12.08.03	Gunung Maligas	51.39	26,173	33,734	34,640	Silau Bayu	9	21176
12.08.21	Pematang Bandar	88.16	31,324	38,688	36,986	Pematang Bandar	13 ^{(g)}	21186
12.08.22	Bandar Huluan	107.33	25,738	29,484	28,749	Naga Jaya I	10	21184
12.08.23	Bandar	100.69	63,584	79,006	77,469	Perdagangan	16 ^{(h)}	21162: 21184
12.08.24	Bandar Masilam	91.22	24,316	30,015	28,615	Bandar Masilam	10	21185
Sub-totals	Central sector	836.32	344,125	416,343	402,288		118	
12.08.16	Girsang Sipangan Bolon	129.89	14,325	17,941	16,703	Parapat	6 ^{(j)}	21174
12.08.11	Tanah Jawa	174.33	45,568	54,900	53,432	Pematang Tanah Jawa	20 ^{(a)}	21181
12.08.12	Hatonduhan	336.26	21,140	26,632	25,955	Buntu Bayu	9	21178
12.08.13	Dolok Panribuan	148.62	17,947	22,018	21,798	Tiga Dolok	15	21173
12.08.06	Jorlang Hataran	93.70	15,316	19,154	17,660	Tiga Balata	8 ^{(a)}	21172
12.08.18	Hutabayu Raja	191.43	29,135	35,426	34,302	Hutabayu	16 ^{(a)}	21182
12.08.19	Jawa Maraja Bah Jambi	38.97	19,951	22,892	21,960	Jawa Maraja	8	21153
12.08.08	Bosar Maligas	285.43	38,970	43,355	40,273	Bosar Maligas	17 ^{(a)}	21183
12.08.30	Ujung Padang	228.49	40,522	44,803	42,310	Ujung Padang	20 ^{(a)}	21187
Sub-totals	Eastern sector	1,627.12	239,874	287,121	274,393		119	
	Totals for Regency	4,372.50	817,720	990,246	955,620	Raya	413	

Notes: (a) including one kelurahan. (b) not to be confused with Tigaraja in Girsang Sipangan Bolon District; in fact the administration of Pematang Silimahuta District would appear to be in Silimahuta Barat desa.
(c) comprises 5 kelurahan (Baringin Raya, Dalig Raya, Merek Raya, Pematang Raya and Sondi Raya) and 12 desa.
(d) The 2010 population of the new Dolog Masagal District is included in the figures for Raya District and Dolok Pardomean District, from which it was cut out in 2017.
(e) includes 2 kelurahan - Aman Sari and Serbelawan. (f) eastern suburbs of Pematangsiantar City.
(g) includes 2 kelurahan - Kerasaan I and Pematang Bandar. (h) includes 2 kelurahan - Perdagangan I and Perdagangan III.
(j) comprises 3 kelurahan (Girsang, Parapat and Tigaraja) and 3 desa.

The urban area of Bandar comprises the four kecamatan (districts) of Pematang Bandar, Bandar Huluan, Bandar and Bandar Masilam, with a combined area of 387.4 km^{2} and a population in mid 2025 of 171,819.

Six southern districts border directly on the north coast of Lake Toba; from west to east, these are Pematang Silimakuta, Silimakuta, Haranggaol Horison, Dolok Pardamean, Pematang Sidamanik, and Girsang Sipangan Bolon.

== Culture ==
Dayang Bandir and Sandean Raja is a folk story from Simalungun.

== Tourism ==
=== White Crater ===
Local people mention it as Bukit Kapur Tinggi Raja, but some people have also called it "Kawah Putih" (White Crater), the same name as Kawah Putih in West Java. The crater is located in Dolok Tinggi Raja Village, 90 kilometres from Medan or 3 to 4 hours drive by motorcycle on the route Medan-Lubuk Pakam-Galang-Bangun Purba-Dolok Tinggi Raja.

=== Parapat ===
Parapat is a small town located on the shore of Lake Toba. This place is known for tourism, and ferry services to Samosir Island are also available.
