= Girsang Sipangan Bolon =

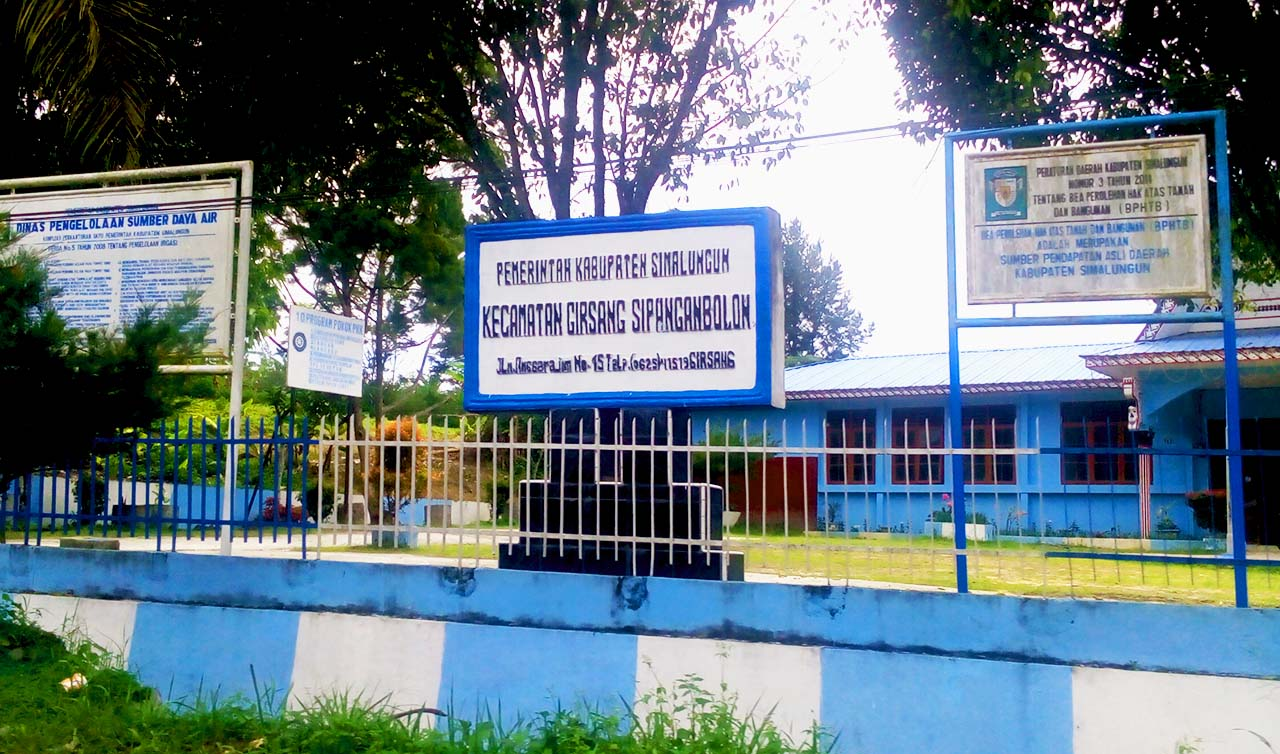
Office district of Girsang Sipangan Bolon

Girsang Sipangan Bolon is an administrative district (kecamatan) in Simalungun Regency, North Sumatra, Indonesia. The district lies on the southwestern side of the regency, and touches the east coast of Lake Toba. The town of Parapat, the main eastern link to Samosir Island, is located within this district. The district covers a land area of 123.56 km^{2}, and is composed of six villages - the rural desa of Sibaganding, Sipangan Bolon and Sipangan Bolon Mekar, and the urban kelurahan of Parapat, Tigaraja (also a part of Parapat town) and Girsang.

== Demographics ==
According to the official estimates as at mid 2023, the district has a population of 18,240. The population density of the district in mid 2023 was 148 persons/km^{2}.
