= Binaka Airport =

Airport in North Sumatra, Indonesia

Binaka Airport Bandar Udara Binaka
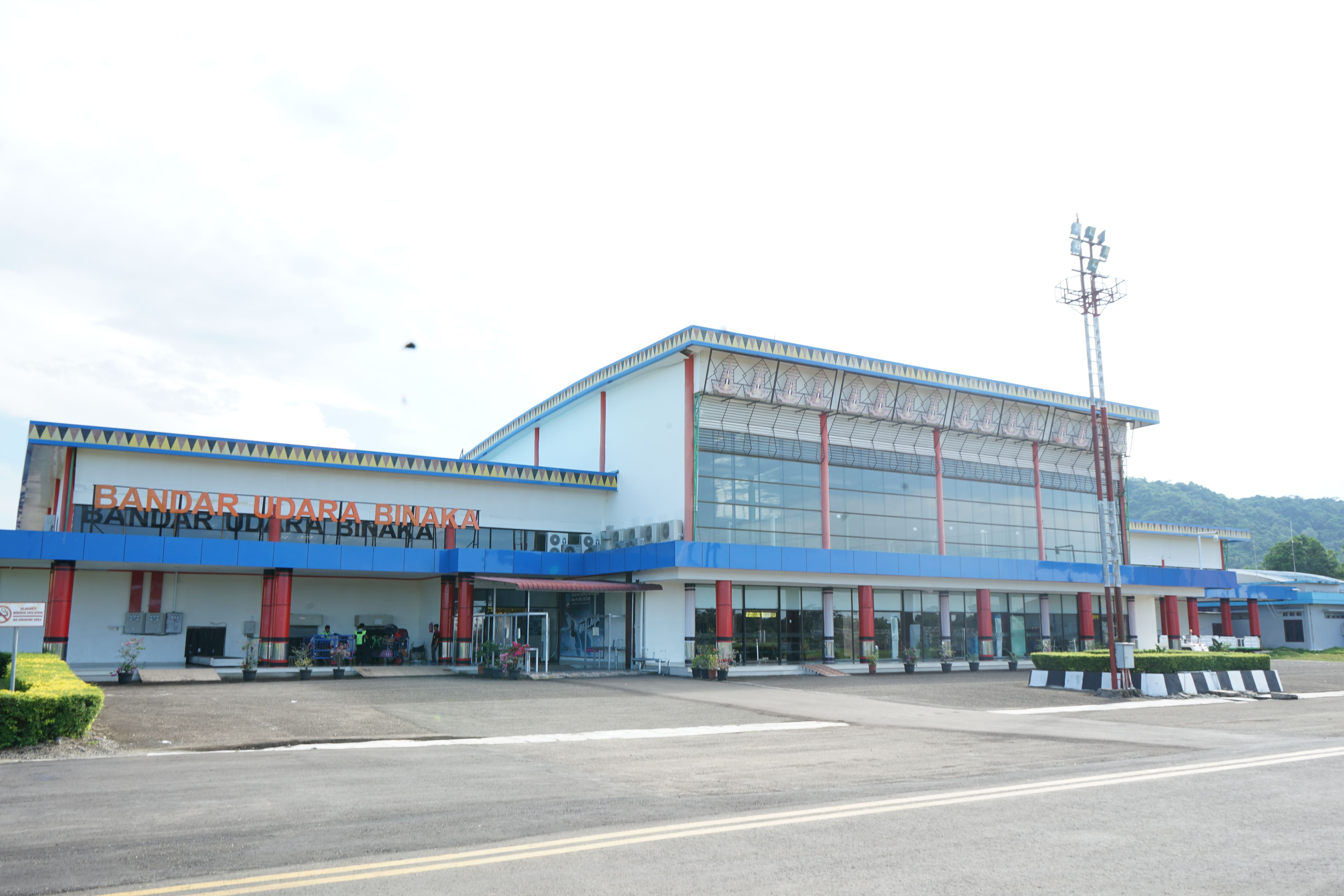
- IATA: GNS; ICAO: WIMB

Summary
- Airport type: Public
- Owner: Government of Indonesia
- Operator: Directorate General of Civil Aviation
- Serves: Gunungsitoli
- Location: Gidö, Nias Regency, North Sumatra, Indonesia
- Time zone: WIB (UTC+07:00)
- Elevation AMSL: 6 m (20 ft)
- Coordinates: 01°09′58″N 97°42′16″E

Maps
- Sumatra region in Indonesia

- Location of airport in Sumatra

Runways
Direction	Length		Surface
Direction	m	ft	Surface
09/27	2,250	7,381	Asphalt

Statistics (2024)
- Passengers: 180,475 (▼17.2%)
- Cargo (tonnes): 428 (▲4.1%)
- Aircraft movements: 3,361 (▼17.8%)
- Source: DGCA

Binaka Airport (IATA: GNS, ICAO: WIMB) is a domestic airport serving Gunungsitoli, the largest city and economic center of Nias Island in North Sumatra, Indonesia. Although it primarily serves Gunungsitoli, the airport is located outside the city limits, in Gidö, Nias Regency, approximately 16 km (9.9 miles) from the city center. It is the only airport on the island and serves as the main point of entry to both Gunungsitoli and the wider Nias region. As of 2026, two airlines serve the airport: Wings Air and Susi Air. Wings Air operates regular inter-Sumatra flights to destinations such as Medan, the provincial capital of North Sumatra, as well as Padang and Pekanbaru. Susi Air operates pioneer routes to destinations such as Parapat, near Lake Toba, and the Batu Islands. In the past, the airport also had direct flights to Jakarta, operated by Garuda Indonesia, though these routes have since been discontinued.

== History ==
=== Construction and early history ===
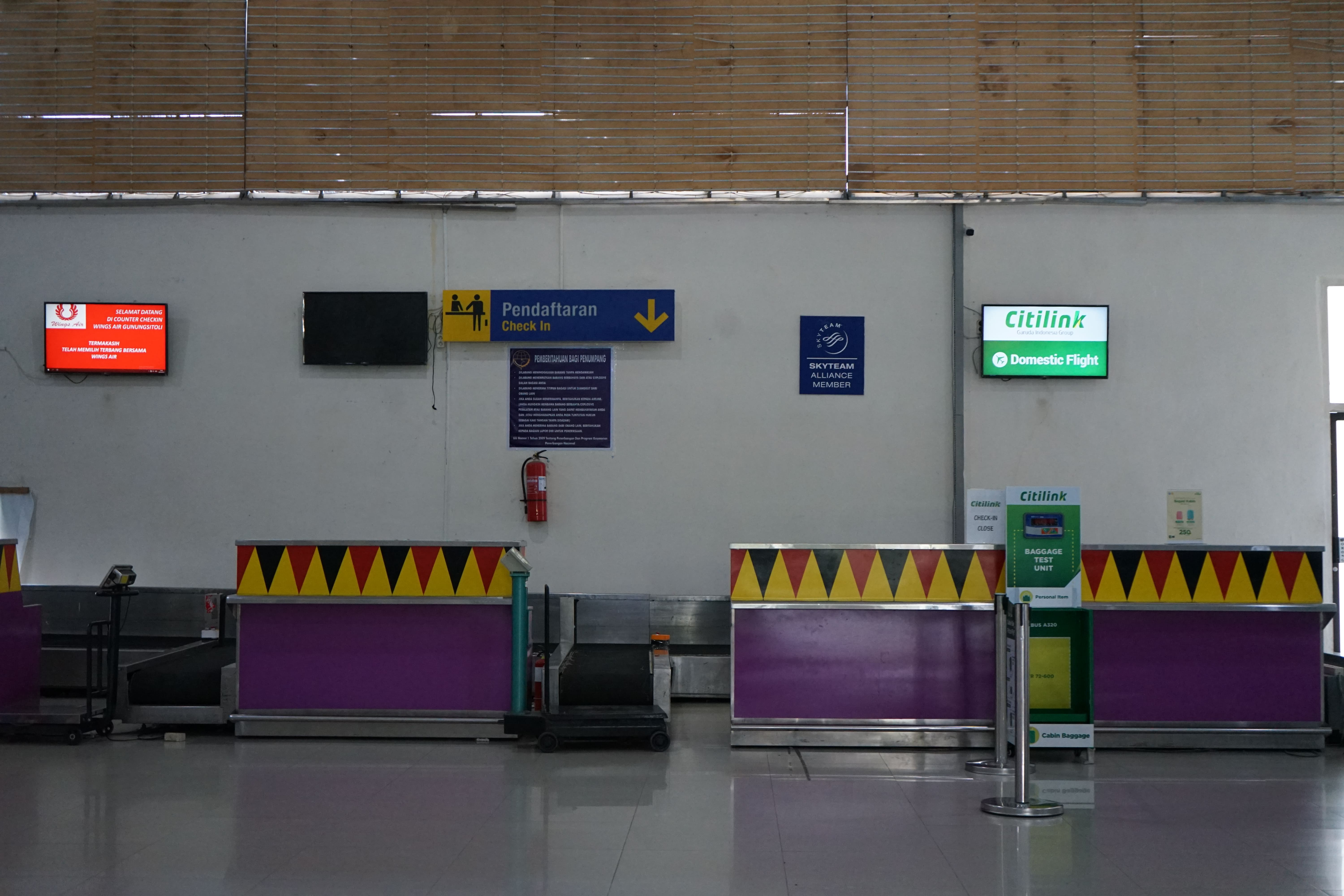
Check-in area

The idea of building an airport in Nias was initiated by Dalihuku Mendröfa, commonly known as Dalimend, who was serving as both the regent of Nias and an active officer in the Indonesian Air Force at the time. He actively lobbied the Ministry of Transportation to support the project, believing that an airport would help break the island’s isolation, promote modernization, and boost tourism development in Nias, which had been declared a national tourism destination by Vice President Sri Sultan Hamengkubuwono IX in 1974. Construction began in 1976 and was completed the following year. The airport was officially inaugurated in a ceremony attended by Dalimend and Emil Salim, the then Minister of Transportation. The inauguration also featured a parachute landing demonstration by personnel from the Indonesian Air Force’s Kopasgat unit, who jumped from a C-130 Hercules aircraft. It was the first such parachute display ever held in Nias.

Merpati Nusantara Airlines became the first airline to serve the airport, connecting Gunungsitoli with Medan, the provincial capital of North Sumatra, on a pioneer flight operated with a de Havilland Canada DHC-6 Twin Otter. At the time, the airport had a short 750 m runway that could accommodate only small aircraft such as the Twin Otter.

The airport suffered significant damage during the 2005 Nias–Simeulue earthquake on 28 March 2005. The earthquake caused the airport’s ATC tower to collapse, disrupting air traffic control and navigational services and effectively preventing aircraft from landing at the airport. The runway also sustained cracks, resulting in the temporary closure of the airport. The airport’s closure in the aftermath of the earthquake severely hampered the delivery of aid and relief supplies to Nias, leaving helicopters as the primary means of transporting assistance to the island.

=== Contemporary history ===
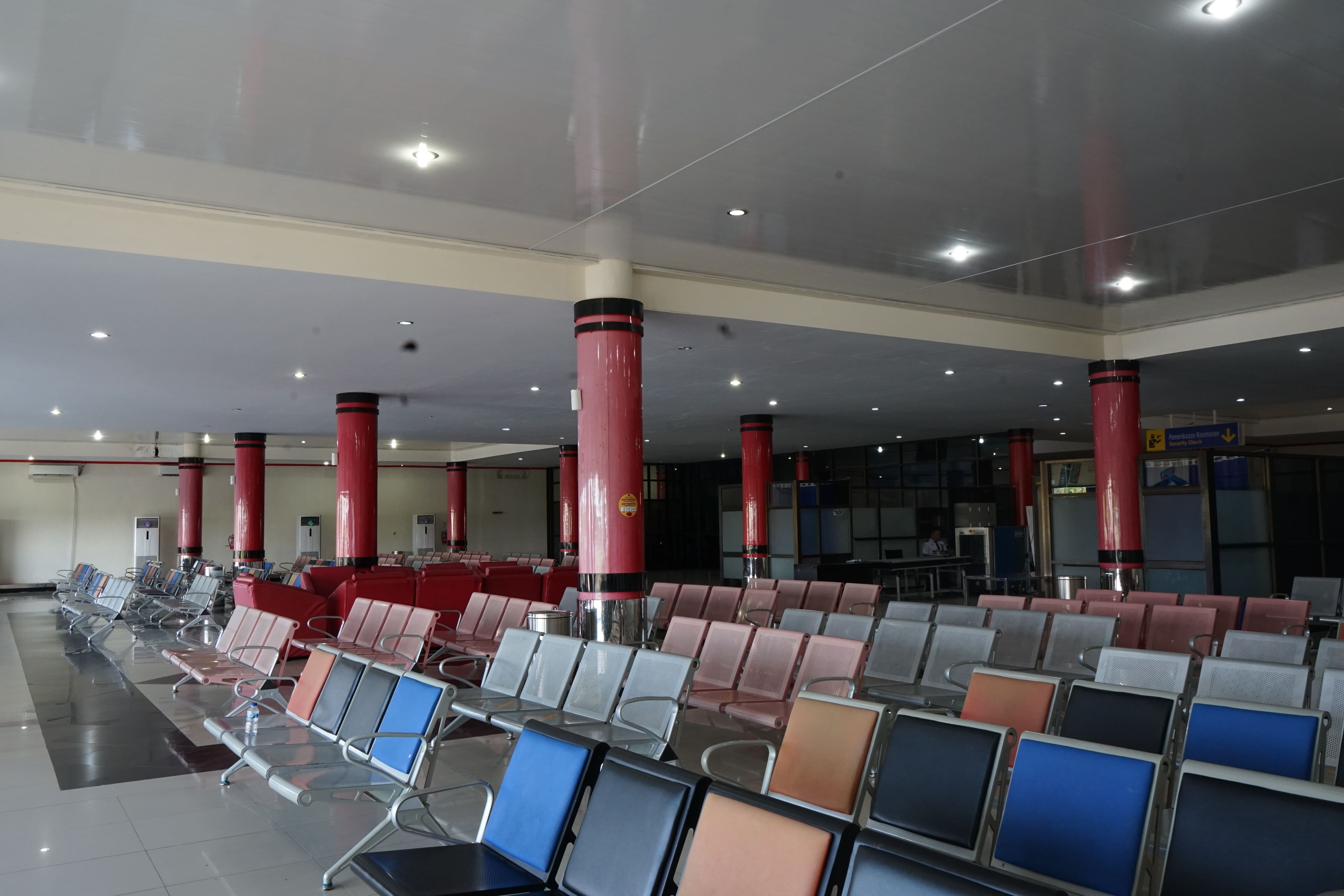
Boarding gate

The airport primarily serves routes between Nias and mainland North Sumatra, such as Medan, with flights operated by Wings Air and, in the past, by Citilink and Garuda Indonesia. Susi Air also operates flights to smaller destinations like Parapat and Sibolga. On 15 November 2018, Garuda Indonesia launched a thrice-weekly direct flight between Jakarta and Gunungsitoli using a Bombardier CRJ-1000, eliminating the need for a transit in Medan. However, the route was discontinued due to the COVID-19 pandemic. On 3 November 2021, Wings Air introduced a new thrice-weekly route connecting Gunungsitoli and Padang using an ATR-72 aircraft. The route was short-lived but resumed in December 2025, and at the same time, the airline also introduced a new route to Pekanbaru. Efforts to reinstate direct flights to Jakarta are ongoing but have yet to materialize.

The local Nias community has proposed renaming the airport Dalimend Airport, in honor of Lieutenant Colonel Dalihuku “Dalimend” Mendröfa, an Indonesian Air Force officer and former regent of Nias who first initiated the idea of its construction. However, any official name change requires approval from the central government.

Due to the growing tourism industry in Nias and the increasing number of foreign visitors, there have been proposals to upgrade the airport to international status and open direct international routes to the island. In 2014, the Ministry of Transportation allocated 100 million rupiah to improve the airport’s infrastructure, including extending the runway from 1,800 meters to 2,250 meters. This upgrade was aimed at accommodating narrow-body aircraft such as the Boeing 737 and Airbus A320, in preparation for potential international flights from destinations like Kuala Lumpur, Penang, and Singapore.

== Facilities and development ==
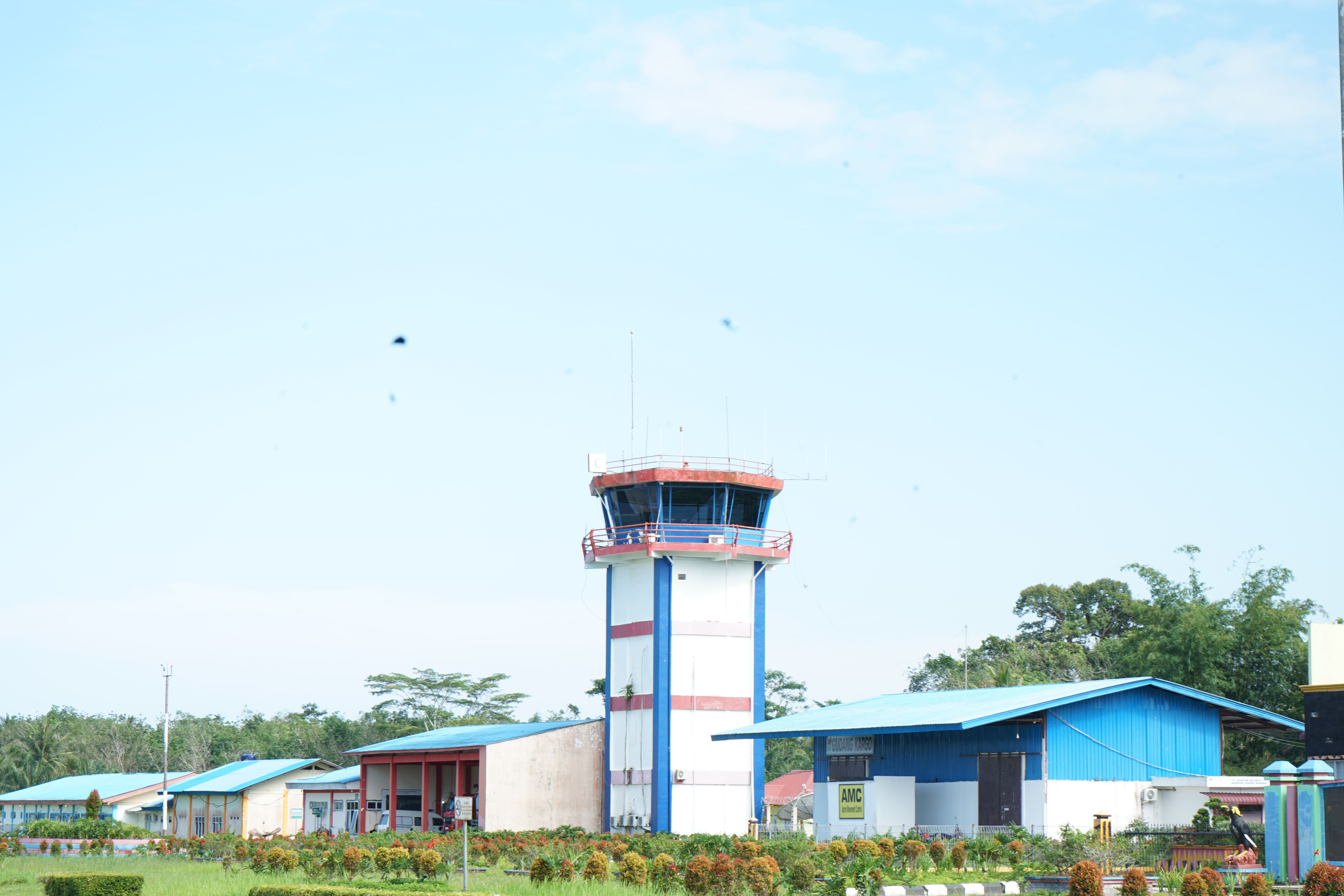
ATC tower

The airport has a single passenger terminal covering an area of 5,571 m² (59,968 sq ft). In 2018, a minor renovation was undertaken to enhance the terminal's appearance and carry out refurbishments, with an estimated cost of approximately 5 billion rupiah. The terminal is equipped with a range of passenger facilities, including an ATM centre, food court, prayer room, lactation room, toilets, baggage-wrapping services, and children’s playgrounds. In addition to the passenger terminal, the airport has a 200 m² (2,153 sq ft) cargo terminal, an 800 m² (8,611 sq ft) VIP terminal, a 400 m² (4,306 sq ft) administrative building, a 200 m² (2,153 sq ft) powerhouse, and a 300 m² (3,229 sq ft) Airport Rescue and Fire Fighting (PKP-PK) building.

On the airside, the airport features a 2,250 m × 45 m (7,382 ft × 148 ft) runway, which was extended from its original dimensions of 1,800 m × 30 m (5,906 ft × 98 ft). It is capable of accommodating narrow-body aircraft such as the Boeing 737 and Airbus A320. The runway is non-instrument and lacks published straight-in instrument approach procedures and electronic navigation aids such as an Instrument Landing System (ILS). Consequently, aircraft operating at the airport rely on visual approaches and are restricted to daytime operations. Plans are in place to further extend the runway to 2,600 m × 60 m (8,530 ft × 197 ft) to accommodate larger aircraft; however, the project is currently facing delays due to land acquisition issues involving local residents. Approximately 3.8 billion rupiah has been allocated for the runway extension. In addition to the runway, the airport is equipped with two taxiways connecting the runway to the apron, each measuring 70 m × 23 m (230 ft × 75 ft), and a single apron measuring 180 m × 80 m (591 ft × 262 ft).

== Airlines and destinations> ==
The following destinations are served from Binaka Airport:

Airlines	Destinations
Susi Air	Batu Islands, Parapat
Wings Air	Medan, Padang, Pekanbaru

== Statistics ==
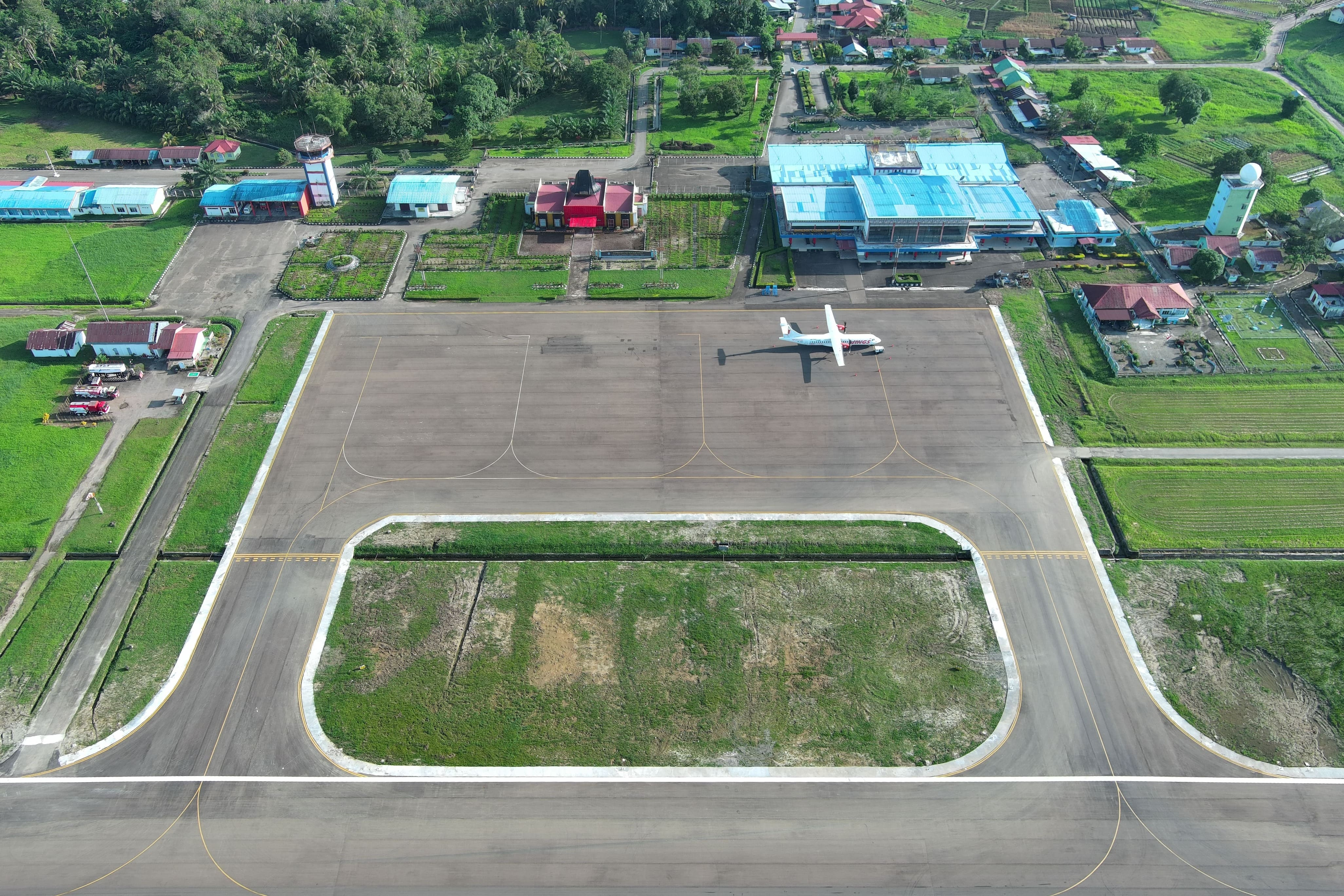
Aerial view of the airport's apron, showing a Wings Air ATR-72 on standby

Annual passenger numbers and aircraft statistics
Year	Passengers handled	Passenger % change	Cargo (tonnes)	Cargo % change	Aircraft movements	Aircraft % change
2006	7,678	Steady	40	Steady	3,288	Steady
2007	93,018	▲1111.5	80	▲100.0	3,762	▲14.4
2008	95,637	▲2.8	55	▼31.3	3,402	▼9.6
2009	88,952	▼7.0	63	14.5	2,850	▼16.2
2010	108,796	▲22.3	42	▼33.3	2,619	▼8.1
2011	190,129	▲74.8	78	▲85.7	3,845	▲46.8
2012	230,522	▲21.2	51	▼34.6	3,793	▼1.4
2013	209,773	▼9.0	29	▼43.1	3,894	▲2.7
2014	204,216	▼2.6	2	▼93.1	4,134	▲6.2
2015	244,949	▲19.9	2	Steady	5,288	▲27.9
2016	332,509	▲35.7	10	▼84.1	6,748	▲27.6
2017	327,401	▼1.5	44	▲340.0	6,198	▼8.2
2018	303,163	▼7.4	66	▲50.0	5,610	▼9.5
2019	301,409	▼0.6	137	▲107.6	5,610	Steady
2020	160,820	▼46.6	1,004	▲632.8	3,758	▼33.0
2021	182,804	▲13.7	717	▼28.6	4,062	▲8.1
2022	215,362	▲17.8	461	▼35.7	4,391	▲8.1
2023	217,899	▲1.2	411	▼10.8	4,089	▼6.9
2024	180,475	▼17.2	428	▲4.1	3,361	▼17.8
^{Source: DGCA, BPS}

== Accidents and incidents ==
- On 12 January 2013, a Wings Air ATR 72-500 operating a flight from Medan to Gunungsitoli experienced a tire burst upon landing at Binaka Airport. Although no injuries were reported among the occupants, the incident led to the temporary closure of the runway for several hours.
