= Lake Sidihoni =

Lake in Indonesia

- Danau Sidihoni (Indonesian); Tao Sidihoni (Batak)
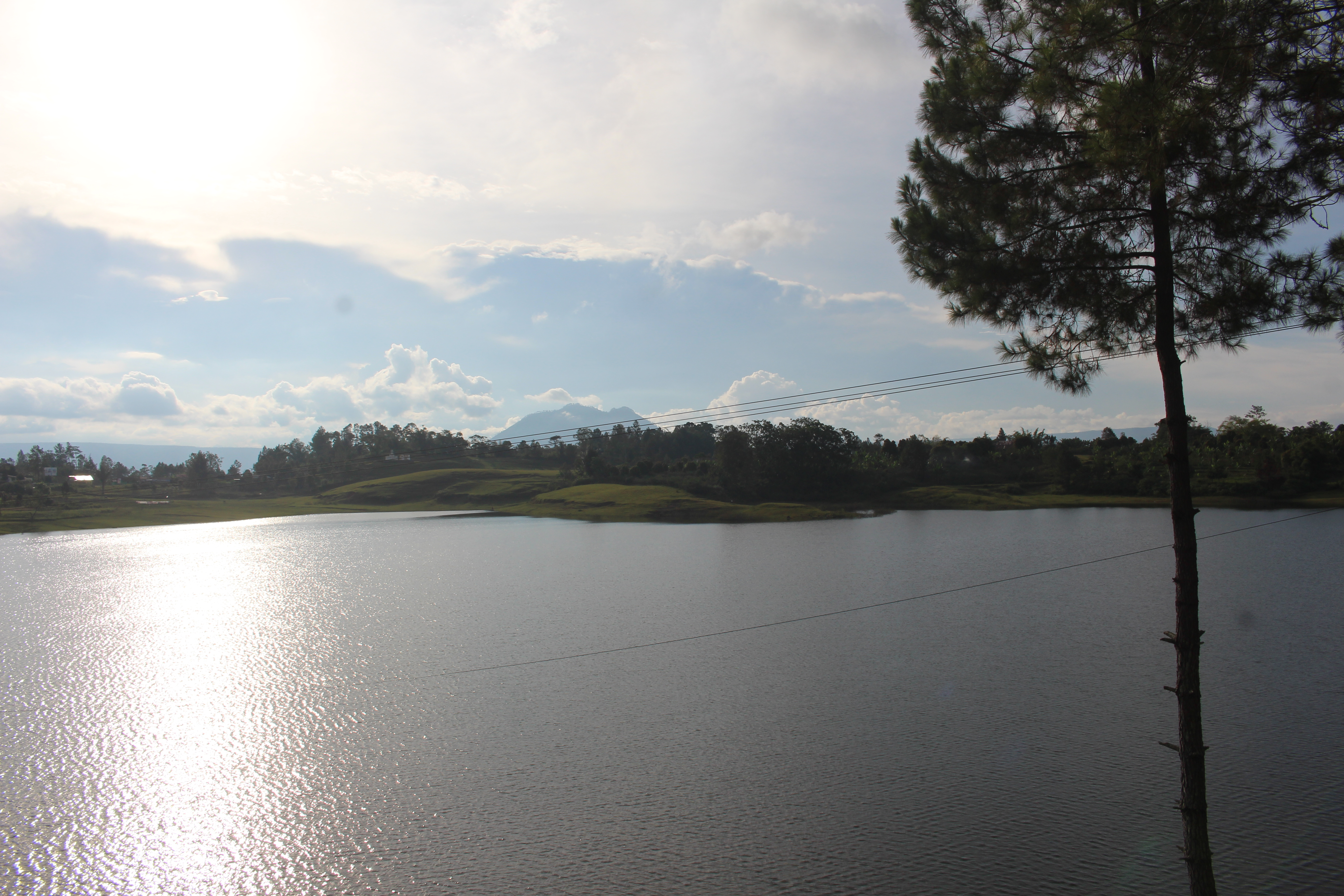

- Location within Northern Sumatra
- Location: Samosir Island, Lake Toba, North Sumatra
- Coordinates: 2°36′05.34″N 98°44′41.15″E
- Basin countries: Indonesia
- Surface elevation: 1,295 m (4,249 ft)

Lake Sidihoni is a lake located within Samosir Island which itself is an island within Lake Toba, in North Sumatra, Indonesia and is therefore notable for being a "lake on an island in a lake on an island". It is approximately 11–12 km to the east of hot spring pools at Pangururan.
