= Uluan Peninsula =

The Uluan Peninsula extends into Lake Toba on the northeastern side toward Medan, in Simalungun Regency and Toba Samosir Regency of North Sumatra province. It has experienced a large amount of uplift because of a series of massive volcanic eruptions that began 1.2 million years ago. The most recent eruption, which occurred 70,000 years ago was among the largest known eruptions ever. Uluan is located on the Porsea caldera, a part of the volcano that erupted approximately 800,000 years ago. Parapat, the primary transit point for tourists going across the lake to Samosir Island, is located on Uluan.

== See also ==
- Toba catastrophe theory
