= Sibisa Airport =

Airport in Indonesia

Sibisa Airport Bandar Udara Sibisa
- IATA: SIW; ICAO: WIMP

Summary
- Airport type: Public
- Operator: Government of Indonesia
- Serves: Parapat
- Location: Ajibata, North Sumatra, Indonesia
- Elevation AMSL: 3,081 ft / 939 m
- Coordinates: 02°36′01″N 098°57′52″E

Map
- Location of airport in Sumatra

Runways
| Direction | Length | | Surface |
| Direction | m | ft | Surface |
|---|---|---|---|
| 14/32 | 750 | 2,461 | Asphalt |
- Source: DAFIF

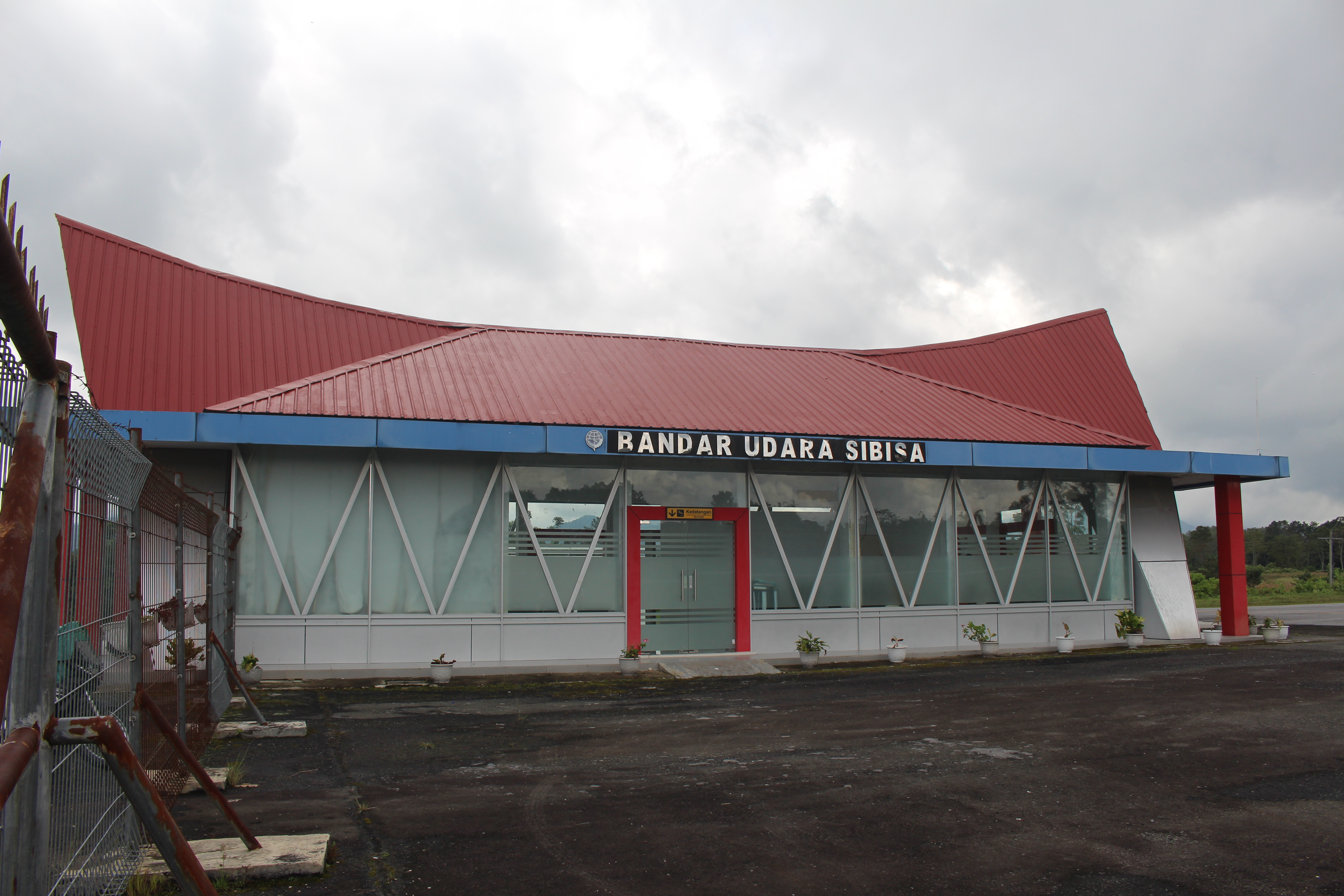
Airport located in Ajibata District, Toba Regency, North Sumatra

Sibisa Airport (IATA: SIW, ICAO: WIMP) is located in Ajibata, Toba Samosir, North Sumatra, Indonesia. The airport is located 10 kilometers from Parapat city, Lake Toba.
