= Ferdinand Lumban Tobing Airport =

Ferdinand Lumban Tobing Airport Bandar Udara Ferdinand Lumban Tobing
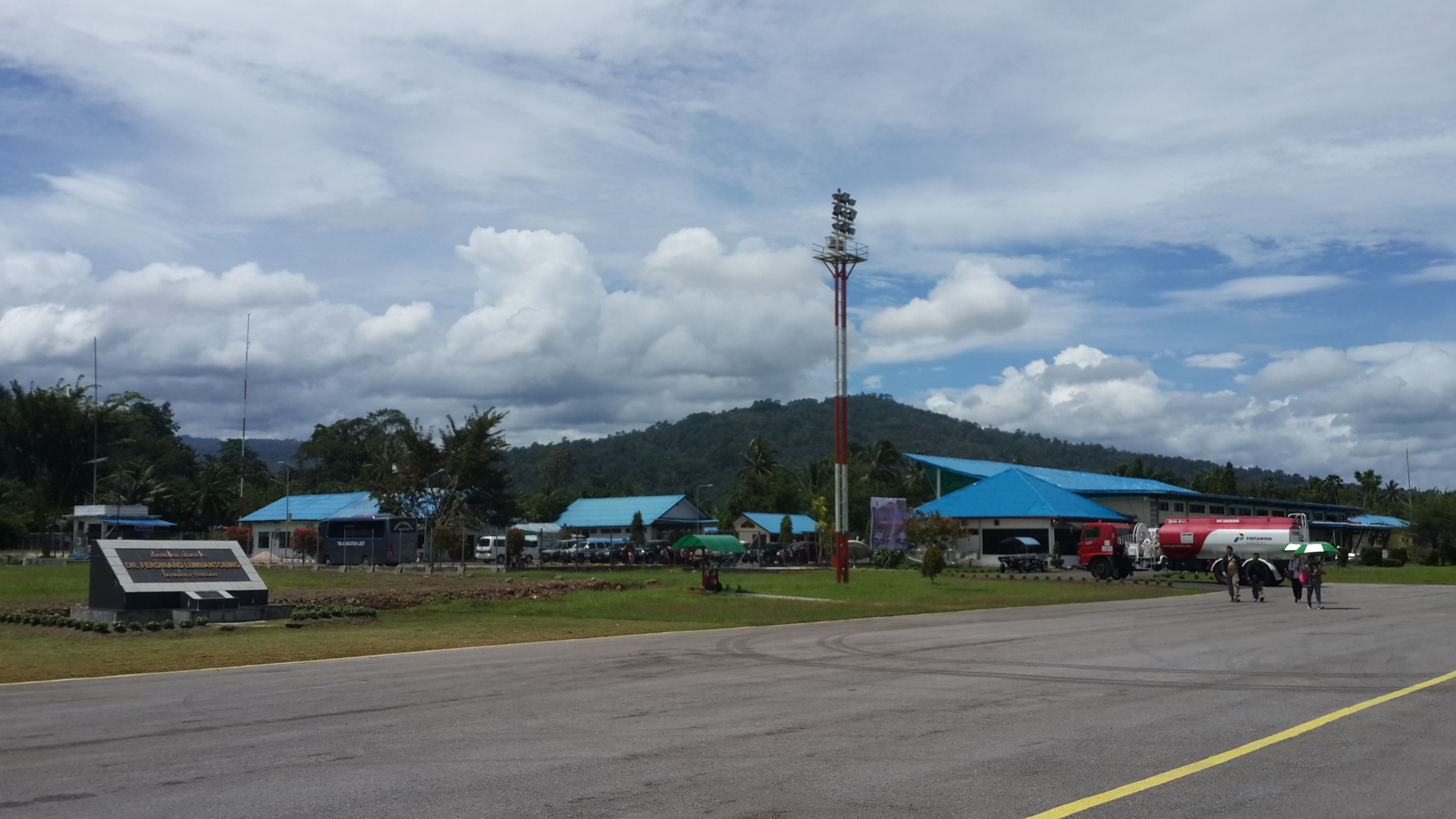
- IATA: FLZ; ICAO: WIMS

Summary
- Airport type: Public
- Operator: Government
- Serves: Sibolga, North Sumatra, Indonesia
- Time zone: WIB (UTC+07:00)
- Elevation AMSL: 10 m (33 ft)
- Coordinates: 01°33′21″N 098°53′20″E

Map
- Location of the airport in the Indonesian Sumatra island

Runways
Direction	Length		Surface
Direction	m	ft	Surface
12/30	2,260	7,415	Asphalt
- Source: WAD, GCM, STV

Dr. Ferdinand Lumban Tobing Airport (also known as Pinangsori Airport) (IATA: FLZ, ICAO: WIMS) serves the city of Sibolga in the North Sumatra province of Indonesia.

== Airlines and destinations ==
The following destinations are served from this airport:

Airlines	Destinations
Susi Air	Batu Islands, Gunung Sitoli
Wings Air	Medan

== See also ==
- Ferdinand Lumban Tobing
