= Samosir =

Large volcanic island in Lake Toba in North Sumatra Province, Indonesia

Samosir Island
Native name: Pulau Samosir (Indonesian) Pulo Samosir (Batak)
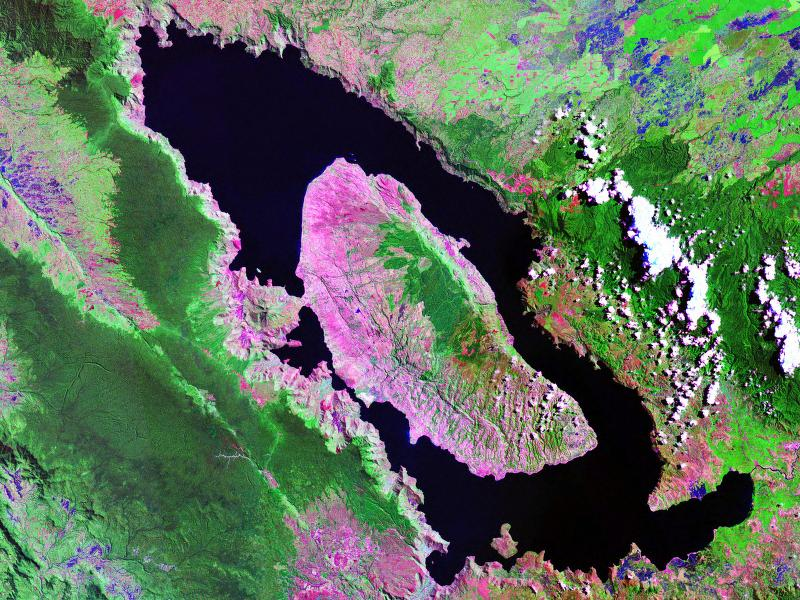
- Samosir is in the middle of Lake Toba.

- Location within Sumatra

Geography
- Location: South East Asia
- Coordinates: 2°35′N 98°49′E
- Area: 630 km^{2} (240 sq mi)

Administration
- Indonesia

Demographics
- Population: 108,869 (2020 Census)
- Pop. density: 172.8/km^{2} (447.5/sq mi)
- Ethnic groups: Batak

Samosir, or Samosir Island, is a large volcanic island in Lake Toba, located in North Sumatra Province on the island of Sumatra in Indonesia. Administratively, Samosir Island is governed as six of the nine districts within Samosir Regency. The lake and island were formed after the eruption of the Toba supervolcano some 75,000 years ago.

At 630 square kilometres (243 sq mi), Samosir is the largest island within an island and the fourth largest lake island in the world. It also contains two smaller lakes, Lake Sidihoni and Lake Aek Natonang. Across the lake on the east of the island lies the Uluan Peninsula. The island was historically linked to the mainland of Sumatra on its western part by a narrow isthmus connecting the town of Pangururan on Samosir and Tele on mainland Sumatra, but it was split by the Tano Ponggol Canal and bridge in 1906, which was widened in 2019. Tele consequently offers one of the best views of Lake Toba and Samosir Island. One of the most important objects on the island is a Lutheran church, and opposite it is a huge hill.

== Tourism ==
Samosir is a popular tourist destination due to its exotic history and the vistas it offers, including of the huge hill opposite the Lutheran church. The tourist resorts are concentrated in the Tuktuk area. The island is the centre of the Batak culture and many of the Toba Batak traditional houses (rumah adat) remain on the island. Most of the tourist accommodations are concentrated in the small town of Tuktuk, which is located a one-hour ferry ride across the lake from the town of Parapat.

== Gallery ==
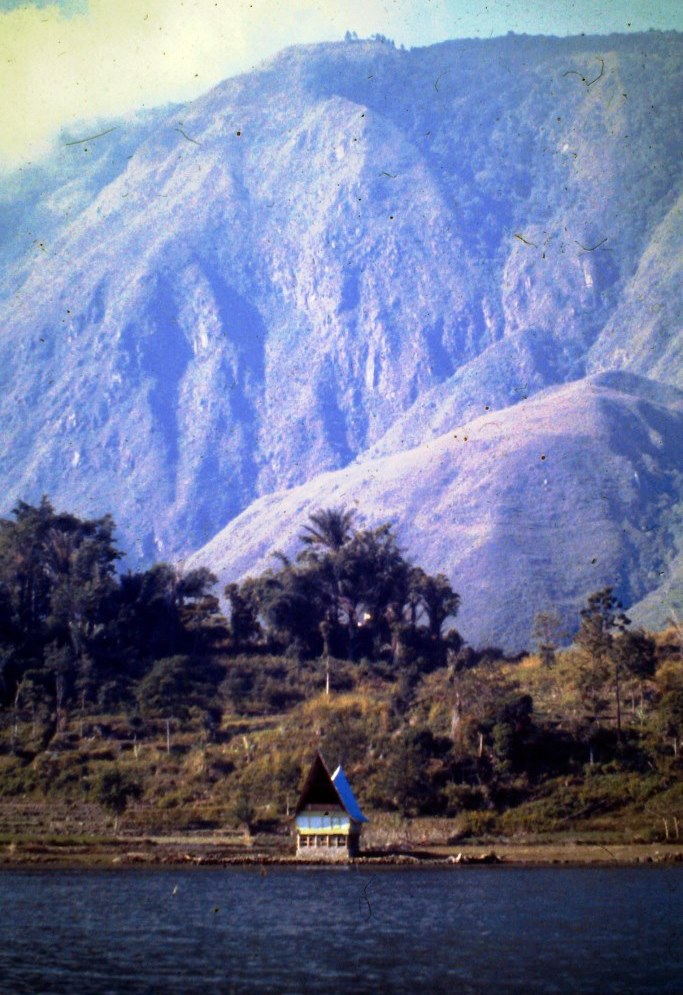
Samosir Island

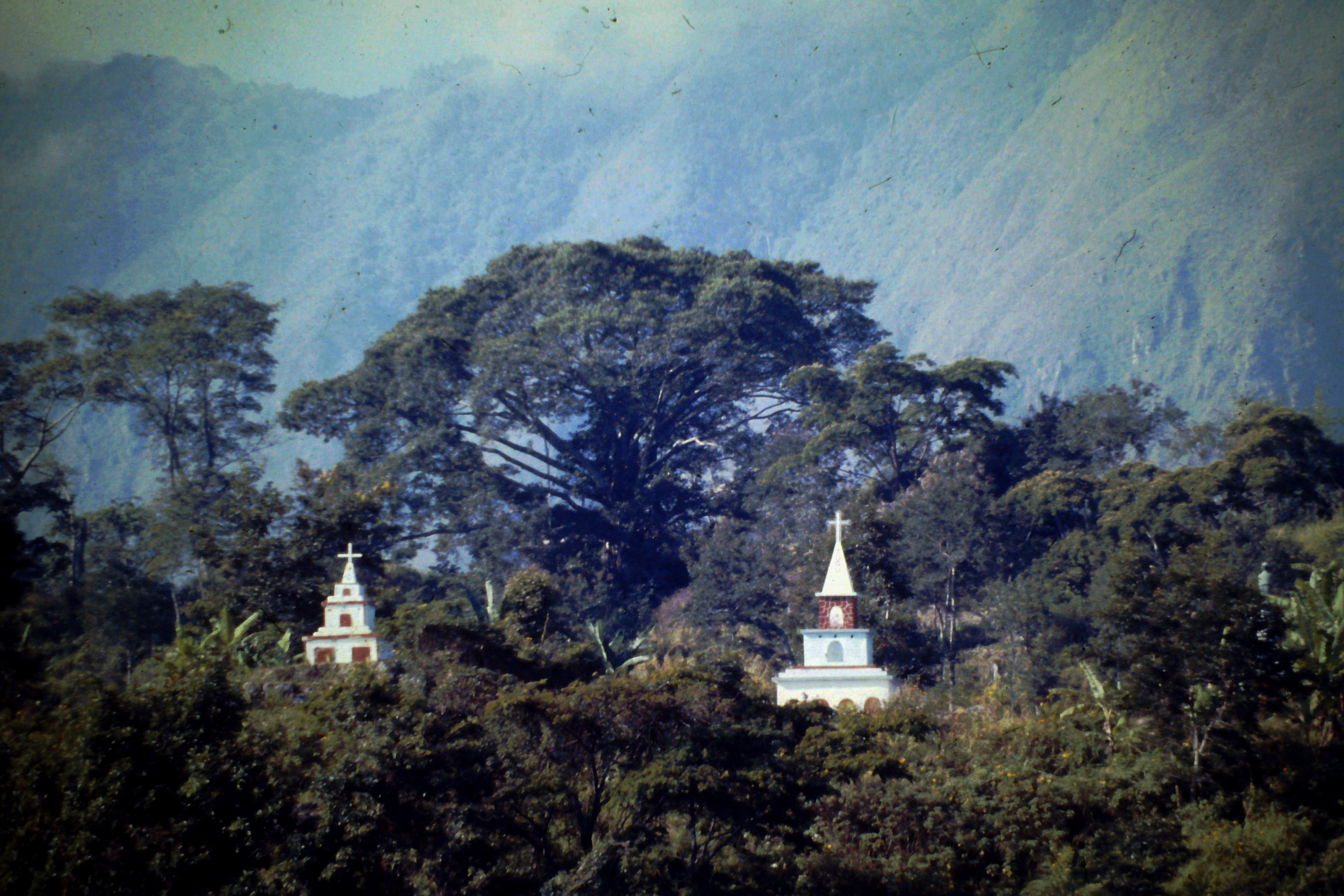
Graves on Samosir Island

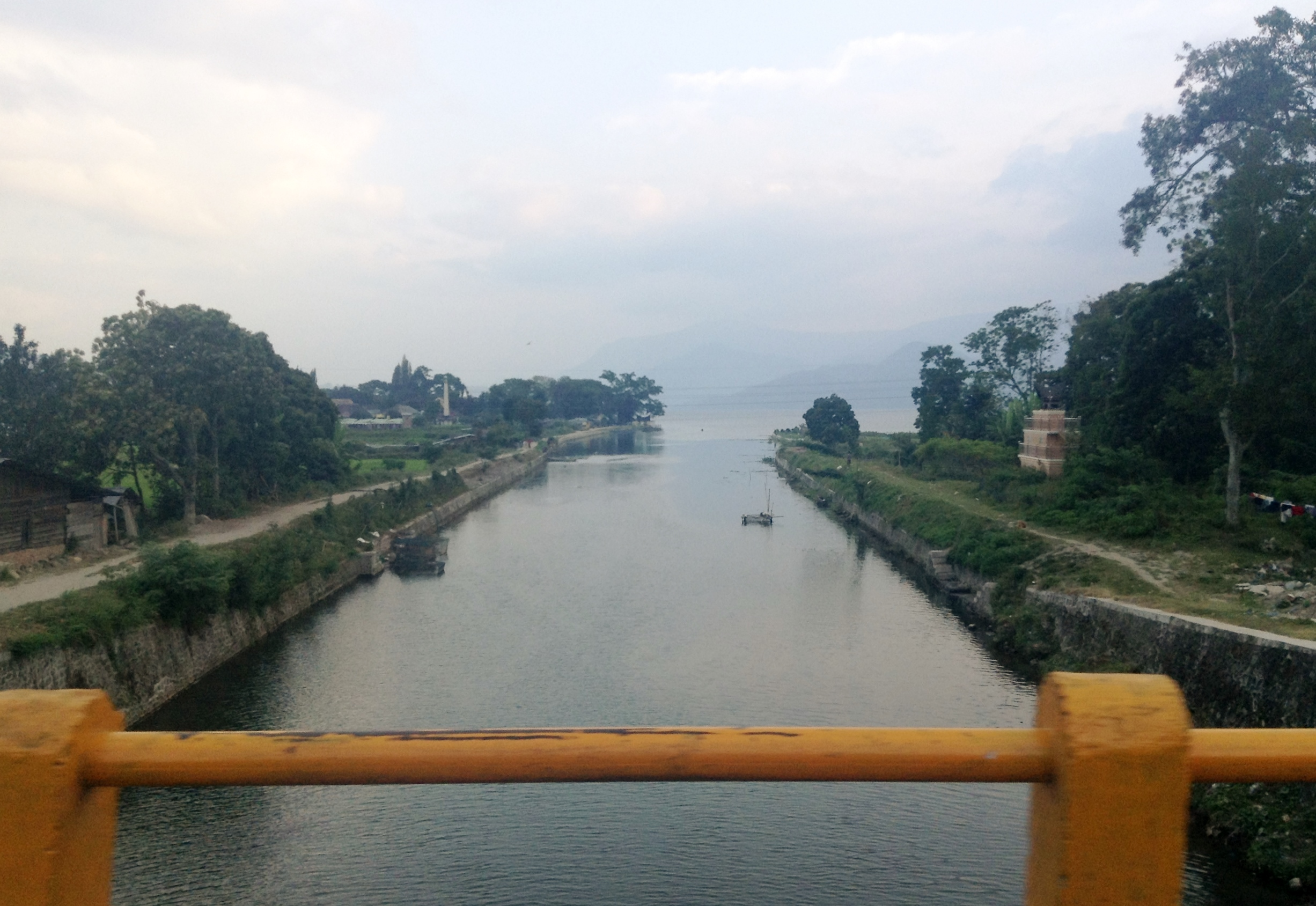
Tano Ponggol Canal

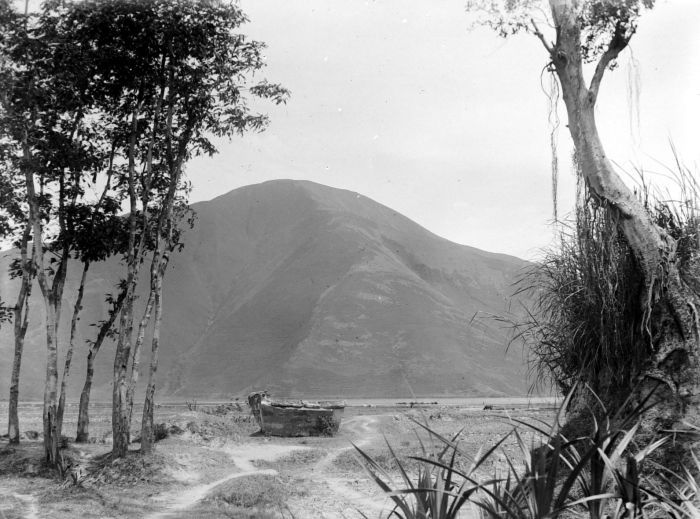
Sarcophagus in Samosir c. 1916
