= Lasondre Airport =

Lasondre Airport Bandar Udara Lasondre
- IATA: LXD; ICAO: WIMO; LID: LSE

Summary
- Airport type: Public
- Operator: Government of Indonesia
- Serves: Batu Islands
- Location: Batu Islands, North Sumatra, Indonesia
- Time zone: WIB (UTC+07:00)
- Elevation AMSL: 0 m (0 ft)
- Coordinates: 00°01′07″S 098°17′57″E

Maps
- Sumatra region in Indonesia

- Location of the airport in Sumatra

Runways
Direction	Length		Surface
Direction	m	ft	Surface
06/24	1,400	4,593	Asphalt
- Source: DAFIF

Lasondre Airport (ICAO: WIMO) is located in Batu Islands, South Nias, North Sumatra, Indonesia.

== Airlines and destinations ==
The following destinations are served from Lasondre Airport:

Airlines	Destinations
Susi Air	Gunung Sitoli, Padang, Sibolga
