= Youngest Toba eruption =

Volcanic supereruption 74,000 years ago in Indonesia

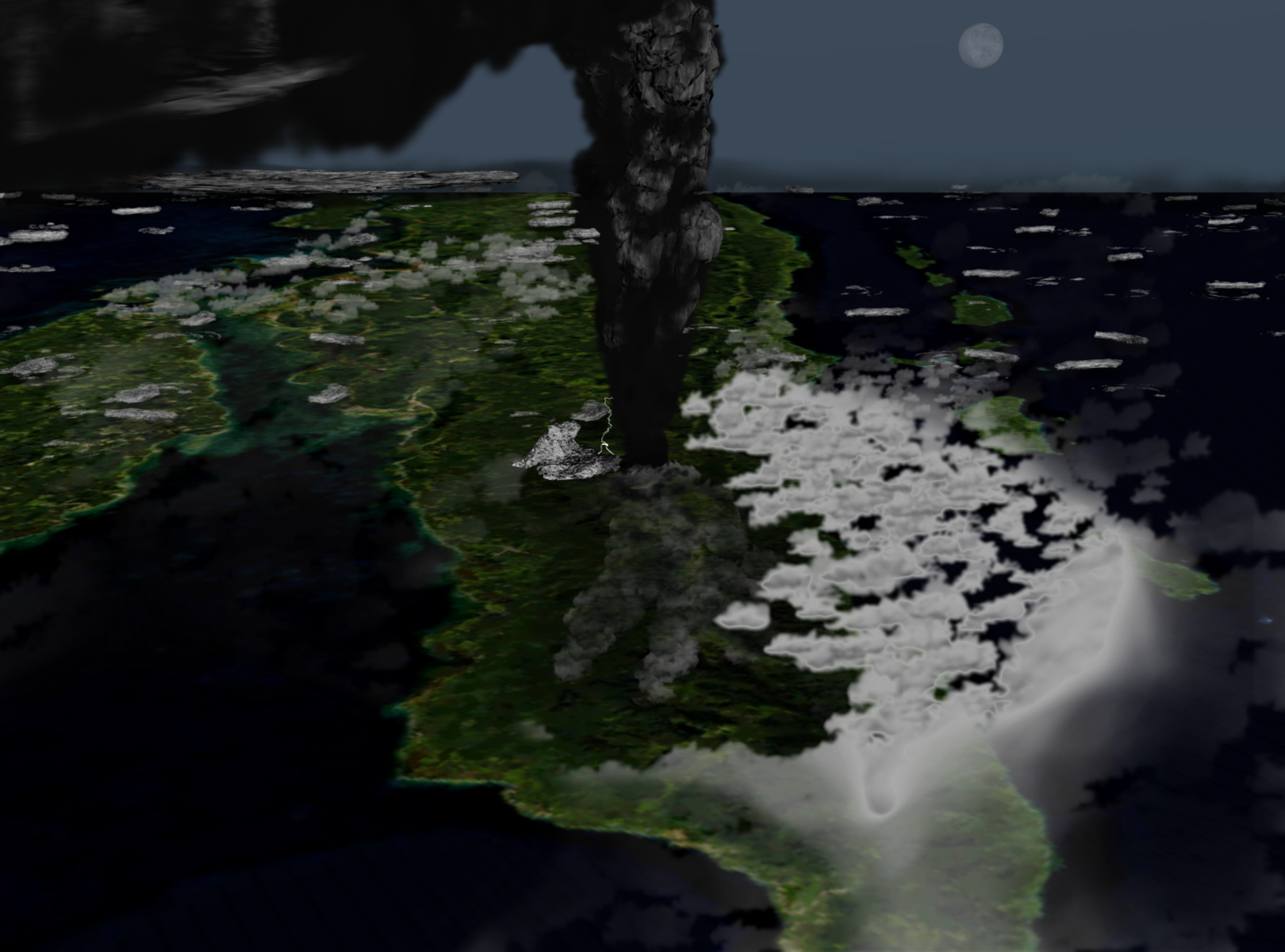
- Artist's impression of early stages of eruption from about 42 km (26 mi) above northern Sumatra
- Volcano: Toba Caldera
- Date: c. 74,000 years ago
- Location: Sumatra, Indonesia; 2.6845°N 98.8756°E
- VEI: 8
- Impact: Covered the Indian subcontinent in 5 cm (2.0 in) of ash, volcanic winter may have caused a severe human population bottleneck
- Deaths: (Potentially) almost all of humanity, leaving around 3,000–10,000 humans left on the planet

Maps
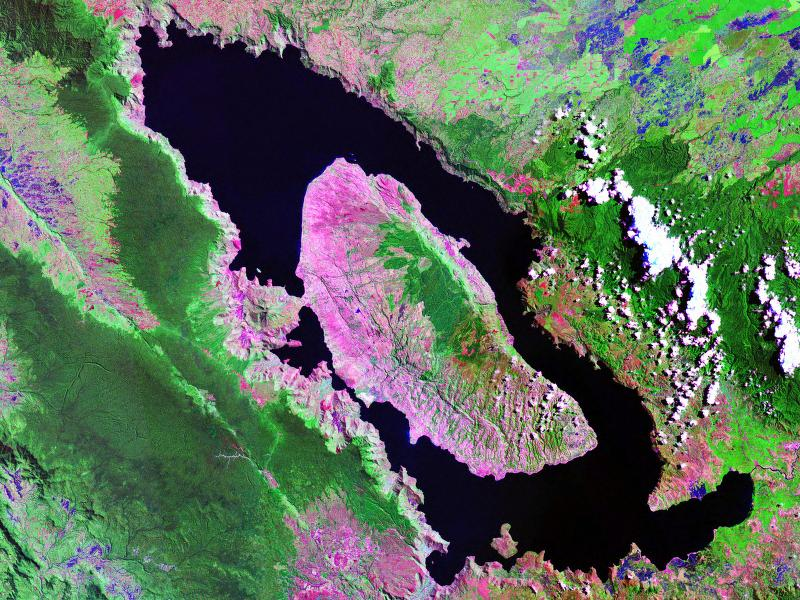
- Lake Toba is the resulting crater lake

The Toba eruption (also called the Toba supereruption and the Youngest Toba eruption) was a large volcanic eruption that occurred around 74,000 years ago during the Late Pleistocene, at the site of present-day Lake Toba in Sumatra, Indonesia. It was the last in a series of at least four caldera-forming eruptions there, the earlier known caldera having formed about 1.2 million years ago. The eruption had an estimated volcanic explosivity index of 8, making it the largest known explosive volcanic eruption in the Quaternary and one of the largest known explosive eruptions in the Earth's history.

== Eruption ==
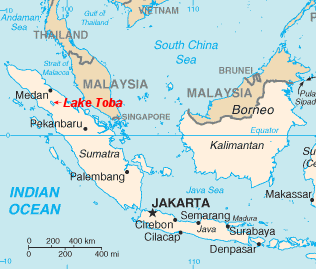
Location of Lake Toba shown in red on map

=== Chronology ===
The pattern of ash deposits suggests that the eruption occurred during the northern summer because only the summer monsoon could have deposited Toba ashfall in the South China Sea. The eruption lasted perhaps 9 to 14 days. The most recent two high-precision argon–argon datings place the eruption at 73,880 ± 320 and 73,700 ± 300 years ago. Five distinct magma bodies were activated within a few centuries before the eruption. The eruption commenced with small and limited air-fall and was directly followed by the main phase of ignimbrite flows. The ignimbrite phase is characterized by low eruption fountain, but co-ignimbrite column developed on top of pyroclastic flows reached a height of 32 km (20 mi). Petrological constraints on sulfur emission yielded a wide range from 1×10^{13} to 1×10^{15} g, depending on the existence of separate sulfur gas in the magma chamber. The lower end of the estimate is related to the low solubility of sulfur in the magma. Ice core records estimate the sulfur emission on the order of 1×10^{14} g.

=== Effects ===
Bill Rose and Craig Chesner of Michigan Technological University estimate that the total amount of material released in the eruption was at least 2,800 km^{3} (670 cu mi)—about 2,000 km^{3} (480 cu mi) of ignimbrite that flowed over the ground, and approximately 800 km^{3} (190 cu mi) that fell as ash mostly to the west. However, as more outcrops become available, the most recent estimate of eruptive volume is 3,800 km^{3} (910 cu mi) dense-rock equivalent, of which 1,800 km^{3} (430 cu mi) was deposited as ash fall and 2,000 km^{3} (480 cu mi) as ignimbrite, making the eruption the largest during the Quaternary period. Previous volume estimates have ranged from 2,000 km^{3} (480 cu mi) to 6,000 km^{3} (1,400 cu mi). Inside the caldera, the maximum thickness of pyroclastic flows is over 600 m (2,000 ft).

The outflow sheet originally covered an area of 20,000–30,000 km^{2} (7,700–11,600 sq mi) with thickness nearly 100 m (330 ft), likely reaching into the Indian Ocean and the Strait of Malacca. The air-fall blanketed the Indian subcontinent in a layer of 5 cm (2.0 in) ash, the Arabian Sea in 1 mm (0.039 in), the South China Sea in 3.5 cm (1.4 in), and Central Indian Ocean Basin in 10 cm (3.9 in). Its horizon of ashfall covered an area of more than 38,000,000 km^{2} (15,000,000 sq mi) in 1 cm (0.39 in) or more thickness (~7.5% of the Earth's surface). Microscopic glass shards from this eruption have been discovered on the south coast of South Africa, in northwest Ethiopia, in Lake Malawi, and in Lake Chala. In South China, tephra is found in Maar Lake.

The subsequent collapse formed a caldera that filled with water, creating Lake Toba. The island in the center of the lake is formed by a resurgent dome.

=== Climatic effects ===
==== Climate at the time of the eruption ====
Greenland stadial 20 (GS20) is a millennium-long cold event in the north Atlantic Ocean that started around the time of the Toba eruption. The initiation of GS20 is dated to 74.0–74.2 kyr, and the event lasted about 1,500 years. It is the stadial part of Dansgaard–Oeschger event 20 (DO20), commonly explained by an abrupt reduction in the strength of the Atlantic meridional overturning circulation (AMOC). A weaker AMOC caused warming in the Southern Ocean and Antarctica, and this asynchrony is known as bipolar seesaw. The start of the GS20 cooling event corresponds to the start of the Antarctic Isotope Maxima 19 warming event. GS20 was associated with iceberg discharges into the north Atlantic, thus it was also named Heinrich stadial 7a. Heinrich events tend to be longer, colder and with weaker AMOC in the Atlantic Ocean than other DO stadials. From 74 to 58 kyr, Earth transitioned from interglacial marine isotope stage (MIS) 5 to glacial MIS 4, experiencing cooling and glacial expansion. This transition is a part of the Pleistocene interglacial-glacial cycle driven by variations in the Earth's orbit. Ocean temperatures cooled by 0.9 °C (1.6 °F), and sea level fell 60 m (200 ft). Northern Hemisphere ice sheets embarked on significant expansion and surpassed the extent of the Last Glacial Maximum in eastern Europe, Northeast Asia and the North American Cordillera. Southern Hemisphere glaciation grew to its maximum extent during MIS 4. Australasia, Africa and Europe were characterized by increasingly cold and arid environments.

==== Possible climate records ====
While the Toba eruption occurred in the backdrop of the rapid climate transitions of GS20 and MIS 4, triggered by changes in ocean currents and insolation, whether the eruption played any role in accelerating these events is debated. South China Sea marine records of climate, sampled at every centennial interval, show 1 °C (1.8 °F) cooling above the Toba ash layer for a thousand years, but the authors concede that it may just be GS20. Arabian Sea marine records confirm that Toba ash occurred after the onset of GS20 but also that GS20 is not colder than GS21 in the records, from which authors conclude that the eruption did not intensify GS20 cooling. Dense sampling of environmental records at every 6–9-year interval in Lake Malawi show no cooling-induced change in lake ecology and in grassy woodlands after the deposition of Toba ash, but cooling-forced aridity killed high-elevation afromontane forests. The Lake Malawi studies suggest that the environmental effects of the eruption were mild and limited to less than a decade in East Africa, but these studies are questioned because of sediment mixing which would have diminished the cooling signal. Environmental records from a Middle Stone Age site in Ethiopia show that a severe drought occurred concurrently with the Toba ash layer, which altered early human foraging behaviours.

Toba ash records have not been identified in ice core samples. However, four sulfate events in the ice strata are proposed to represent the deposition of aerosols from the Toba eruption. One sulfate event at 73.75–74.16 kyr, which has all the characteristics of the Toba eruption, is among the largest sulfate loadings that have ever been identified. In the ice core records, GS20 cooling was already underway by the time of sulfate deposition; however, a 110-year period of accelerated cooling followed this sulfate event. The authors interpret this acceleration as AMOC weakened by the eruption.

==== Climate modeling ====
The modeled climate effects of the eruption hinges on the mass of sulfurous gases and aerosol microphysical processes. Modeling on an emission of 8.5×10^{14} g of sulfur, which is 100 times the 1991 Pinatubo sulphur, volcanic winter has a maximum global mean cooling of 3.5 °C (6.3 °F) and returns gradually within the range of natural variability 5 years after the eruption. An initiation of a 1,000-year cold period or ice age is not supported by the model. Two other emission scenarios, 1×10^{14} g and 1×10^{15} g, were investigated using simulations provided by the Community Earth System Model, resulting in mean cooling between 2.3 °C (4.1 °F) and 4.1 °C (7.4 °F). A strong decrease in precipitation occurs in the higher emission scenario. Negative temperature anomalies return to less than 1 °C (1.8 °F) within 3 and 6 years for each emission scenario after the eruption. But so far no model can simulate aerosol microphysical processes with sufficient accuracy, empirical constraints from historical eruptions suggest that aerosol size may substantially reduce the magnitude of cooling to less than 1.5 °C (2.7 °F), no matter how much sulfur is emitted.

== Toba catastrophe theory ==
The Toba catastrophe theory holds that the eruption caused a severe global volcanic winter of six to ten years and contributed to a 1,000-year-long cooling episode, resulting in a genetic bottleneck in humans. However, some physical evidence disputes the association with the millennium-long cold event and genetic bottleneck, and some consider the theory disproven.

=== History ===
In 1972, an analysis of human hemoglobins found very few variants, and to account for this low frequency of variation, the human population must have been as low as a few thousand until very recently. More genetic studies confirmed an effective population on the order of 10,000 for much of human history. Subsequent research on the differences in human mitochondrial DNA sequences dates a rapid growth from a small effective population size of 1,000 to 10,000, sometime between 35 and 65 kyr. Recent research shows the extent of climate change was much smaller than believed by proponents of the theory.

In 1993, science journalist Ann Gibbons posited that population growth was suppressed by the cold climate of the last Pleistocene Ice Age, possibly exacerbated by the Toba super-eruption which at the time was dated to between 73 and 75 kyr near the beginning of glacial period MIS 4. The subsequent explosive human expansion was believed to be the result of the end of the ice age. Geologist Michael R. Rampino of New York University and volcanologist Stephen Self of the University of Hawaiʻi at Mānoa support her theory. In 1998, anthropologist Stanley H. Ambrose of the University of Illinois Urbana-Champaign used coalescence evidence of some genes to hypothesize that the Toba eruption caused a human population crash to only a few thousand surviving individuals, and the subsequent recovery was suppressed by the global glacial condition of MIS 4 until the climate eventually transitioned to the warmer condition of MIS 3 about 60,000 years ago, during which rapid human population expansion occurred.

=== Possible effects on Homo ===
At least two other Homo lineages, H. neanderthalensis and Denisovans, survived the Toba eruption and subsequent MIS 4 ice age, as their latest presence is dated to c. 40 kyr, and c. 55 kyr. Other lineages, including H. floresiensis and H. luzonensis, may have also survived through the eruption. More recently, reconstructions of human demographic history using whole-genome sequencing and discoveries of archaeological cultures within the ash layer add further light to how humans had fared during the eruption and the following GS20 and MIS 4 ice age.

==== Human demographic history ====
Recent analyses apply Markov models to the complete set of genetic material to infer human population history. In non-African populations, studies recover a long-term steep decline in numbers starting 200 kyr and reaching the lowest point around 40–60 kyr. During this bottleneck non-African populations experienced 5- to 15-fold reduction, with an effective population size of 1,000–3,000 individuals by 50 kyr, consistent with the earliest mtDNA studies. This severe non-African contraction is consistent with a founder effect caused by Out-of-Africa dispersal. As a small group with a size of a few thousand people migrated from the African continent into the Near East, the drastic reduction in numbers imprinted on non-African genomic diversity. Genetic analysis identified 56 selective sweeps related to cold adaptations in non-African populations, of which 31 sweeps occurred during 72–97 kyr. This event of closely timed selections is named the "Arabian Standstill" and may have been caused by the severe cold, arid conditions from the onset of MIS 4 and exacerbated by the Toba super-eruption.

African populations experienced a slightly earlier, milder bottleneck and recovered earlier. Estimated effective population size based on samples from the Luhya and Maasai people attained their lowest numbers around 70–80 kyr, while those from the Yoruba people reached a nadir around 50 kyr, though the long-term declining trend already started before 200 kyr. The estimated remaining effective population sizes are around 10,000 individuals, larger than the estimated non-African size during their bottleneck. Unlike the non-African populations, there is no consensus as to the cause of the African bottleneck. Proposed causes include climatic deterioration (from MIS 5, Toba eruption, GS20 and/or MIS 4), reduction in substructure across African populations, and founder effects from the dispersal within Africa.

Earlier genetic analysis of Alu sequences across the entire human genome has shown that the effective human population size was less than 26,000 at 1.2 million years ago; possible explanations for the low population size of human ancestors may include repeated population crashes or periodic replacement events from competing Homo subspecies. Whole-genome analysis similarly recovers very low African population sizes around 1 million years ago. This 1 million year old bottleneck is thought to have been caused by severe ice age MIS 22 which marked the mid-Pleistocene climate transition with widespread aridity across Africa.

==== Archaeological studies ====
Other research has cast doubt on an association between the Toba eruption and a genetic bottleneck. For example, ancient stone tools at the Jurreru Valley in southern India (Andhra Pradesh) were found above and below a thick layer of ash from the eruption and were very similar across these layers, suggesting that the dust clouds from the eruption did not wipe out this local population. However, another site in India, the Middle Son Valley (in Madhya Pradesh), exhibits evidence of a major population decline, and it has been suggested that the abundant springs of the Jurreru Valley may have offered its inhabitants unique protection.

At the Jurreru Valley, Middle Paleolithic stone tools below the ash layer are dated by OSL to 77±4 kyr, while the age of stone tools above the ash layer is constrained to be no older than 55 kyr. This age gap is suspected to be caused by the removal of post-eruption sediments or decimation of the local population until re-occupation at 55 kyr. Additional archaeological evidence from southern and northern India also suggests a lack of evidence for effects of the eruption on local populations, causing the authors of the study to conclude, "many forms of life survived the supereruption, contrary to other research which has suggested significant animal extinctions and genetic bottlenecks".

However, some researchers have questioned the techniques utilized to date artifacts to the period subsequent to the supervolcano, which also coincides with the disappearance of the Skhul and Qafzeh hominins. Evidence from pollen analysis suggests prolonged deforestation in South Asia, and some researchers posit that the Toba eruption may have forced humans to adopt new adaptive strategies which may have permitted them to replace Neanderthals and "other archaic human species".

=== Genetic bottlenecks in other mammals ===
Some evidence indicates population crashes of other animals after the eruption. The populations of the eastern African chimpanzee, Bornean orangutan, central Indian macaque, gorillas cheetah and tiger, all expanded from very small populations around 55-70 kyr.

== See also ==
- Early human migrations – Spread of humans from Africa across the world
- Most recent common ancestor – Most recent individual from which all organisms in a group are directly descended
- Late Pleistocene extinctions – Extinction of large animals at the end of the last Ice Age
- Timeline of volcanism on Earth
- Wallace Line – Line separating Asian and Australian fauna
