= Parapat =

Coordinates: 2°039′028″N 98°056′021″E

- Village
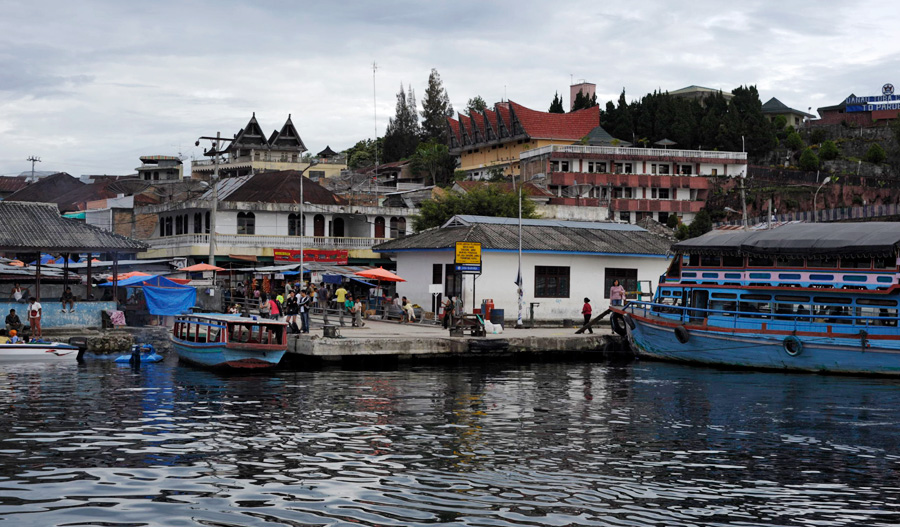
- View of Parapat from Lake Toba
- Interactive map of Parapat
- Country: Indonesia
- Province: North Sumatra
- Regency: Simalungun Regency
- District: Girsang Sipangan Bolon
- Elevation: 900 m (3,000 ft)

Population (mid 2025 estimate)
  - Total: 12,707
- Time zone: UTC+7 (WIB)

Parapat is a small town and port in North Sumatra province on the edge of Lake Toba, on the Uluan Peninsula where it forms the closest point to Samosir Island. It is the primary transit point by ferry for visitors going across the lake to Samosir Island. The town had a population of 12,707 as at mid 2024 (comprising the three kelurahan of Parapat, Tigaraja and Girsang). Administratively it is part of Girsang Sipangan Bolon District (which comprises the 3 rural villages or desa - Sipangan Bolon and Sipangan Bolon Mekar are both south of Parapat, and Sibaganding is north of Parapat - as well as the 3 kelurahan) all within Simalungun Regency.

== Administrative Districts ==
Parapat kelurahan consists of the following villages:

- Bangun Dolok
- Buntu Pasir
- Parapat

== Port ==
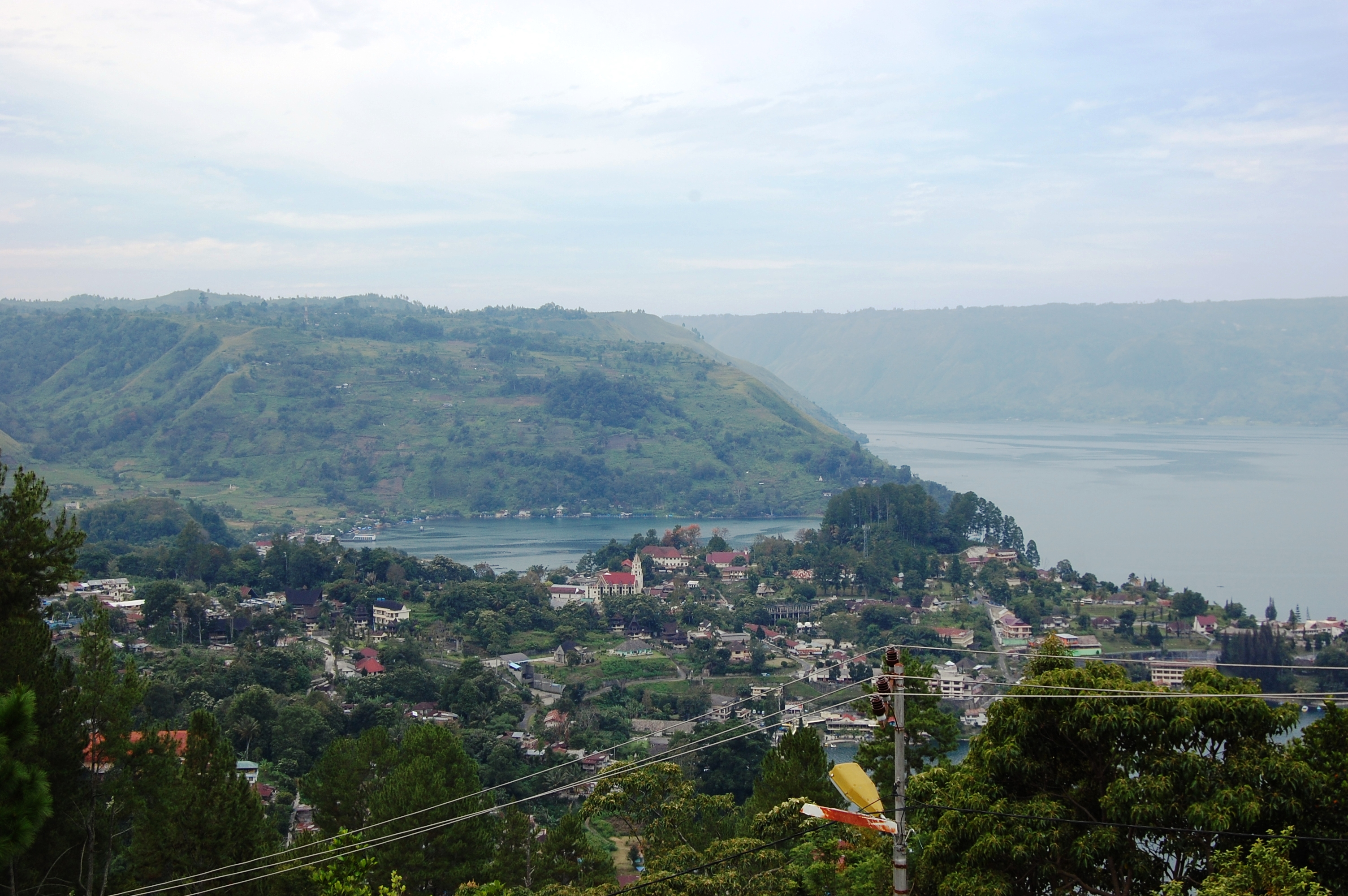
The birdeye view of Parapat

In Parapat, Ajibata ferry port provides transportation to Samosir Island; it is the most direct route from Medan and the east.

Parapat is very famous for the beauty of Lake Toba. This town is a famous tourist attraction in North Sumatra. In fact, in the 1990s it became a favorite destination for foreign tourists. However, in 1997, there was a financial crisis that made some tourists reluctant to travel to this place. However, the Parapat community and the government are striving to advance Parapat's tourism industry.

== Transportation ==
Sisingamangaraja XII International Airport is located about 47 mi (76 km) distance from Parapat town. It is also connected via Trans-Sumatran Highway to Pematang Siantar by a 48 km road.

== Places of interest ==
- Batu Gantung (Hanging Stone)
- Sukarno's house when in exile
- Parapat Ferry Harbour
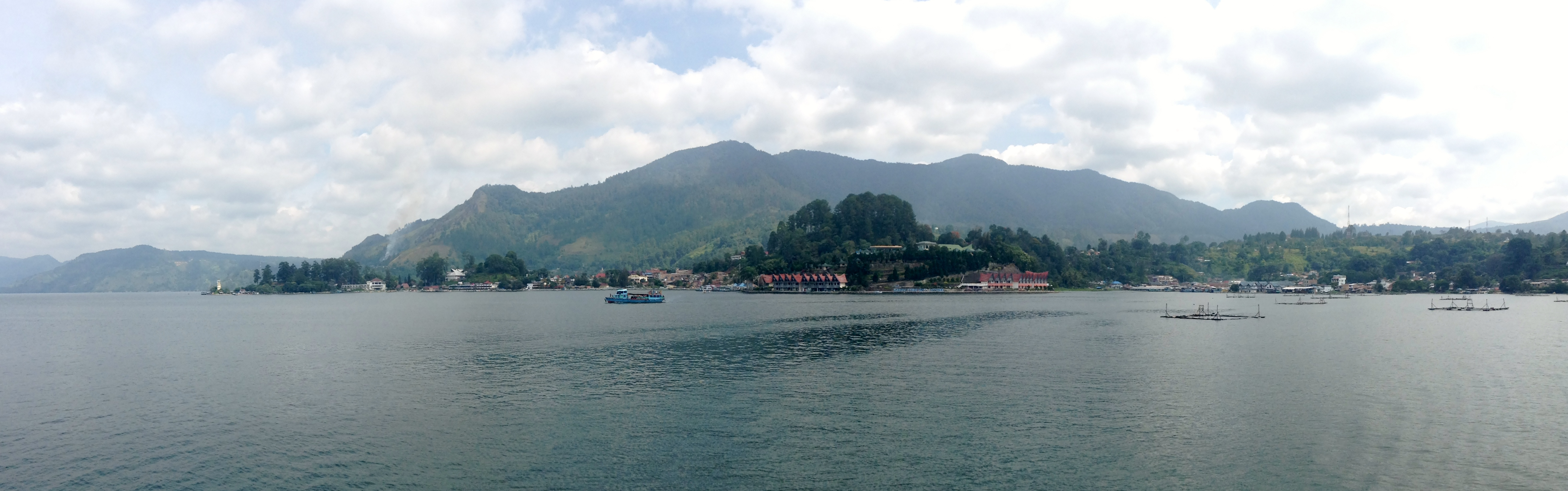
Panoramic view of Parapat from Lake Toba
