= William I. Rose (geologist) =

American volcanologist

William Rose
- Born: 1944; Detroit, Michigan, United States
- Died: July 17, 2025 (aged 80–81); Eagle Harbor, Michigan, United States
- Education: Dartmouth College (PhD)
- Known for: Remote sensing of volcanic plumes
- Children: 2
- Scientific career
- Fields: Volcanologist
- Workplaces: Michigan Technological University
- Doctoral advisor: Richard Stoiber

William Ingersoll Rose, known as Bill Rose (1944 - 17 July 2025), was emeritus professor of petrology at Michigan Technological University. He was best known for his work in the field of volcanology and remote sensing.

== Career ==
Rose was born in 1944 in Detroit, Michigan to William Ingersoll Rose and Mary Jane (nee Brown). At the age of five, Rose moved with his family to Corrales, New Mexico. He studied geography and geology at Dartmouth College from 1962-1966, graduating with a BA. He remained at Dartmouth to complete a PhD under the supervision of Professor Richard Stoiber, from 1966 to 1970. He took up a faculty position at Michigan Tech in September 1970.

From 1970 to 1990, he rose from Assistant Professor in Petrology to full Professor at Michigan Technological University, and was appointed Research Professor in 2011. He served as chair of the Department of Geological and Mining Engineering and Sciences from 1990 to 1998. Rose also spent periods as visiting scientist or visiting fellow at NCAR, USGS, Volcanological Survey of Indonesia, Cascades Volcano Observatory and Bristol University.

In his career, Rose worked across a wide range of topics in volcanology. His early work with Stoiber included studies of the fumaroles and incrustations at steaming volcanoes across Central America. He worked extensively on volcanic gas and ash emissions from volcanic systems, and on processes in volcanic plumes, and on the detection of ice in eruption plumes from remote sensing data. Rose spent much of his career working on the volcanoes of Central America. He established programmes and activities for training in the region, and edited several books on the topics of volcanism and hazards in that region.

During his retirement, Rose remained active, and developed new themes in the area of geoheritage with a particular focus on the Copper Country of the Keweenaw Peninsula and Isle Royale.

== Recognition and awards ==
Rose was awarded the 2002 N. L. Bowen Award of the American Geophysical Union for his contributions to geosciences, volcanology and remote sensing. In 2013, Rose was elected Fellow of the American Geophysical Union, in recognition of his scientific contributions and eminence in the field.

== Family ==
Rose married Nanno in 1967, and they had two children. He died in Eagle Harbor, Michigan in July 2025.
