= Lake Toba =

Volcanic lake located in North Sumatra Province, Indonesia

- Danau Toba (Indonesian)
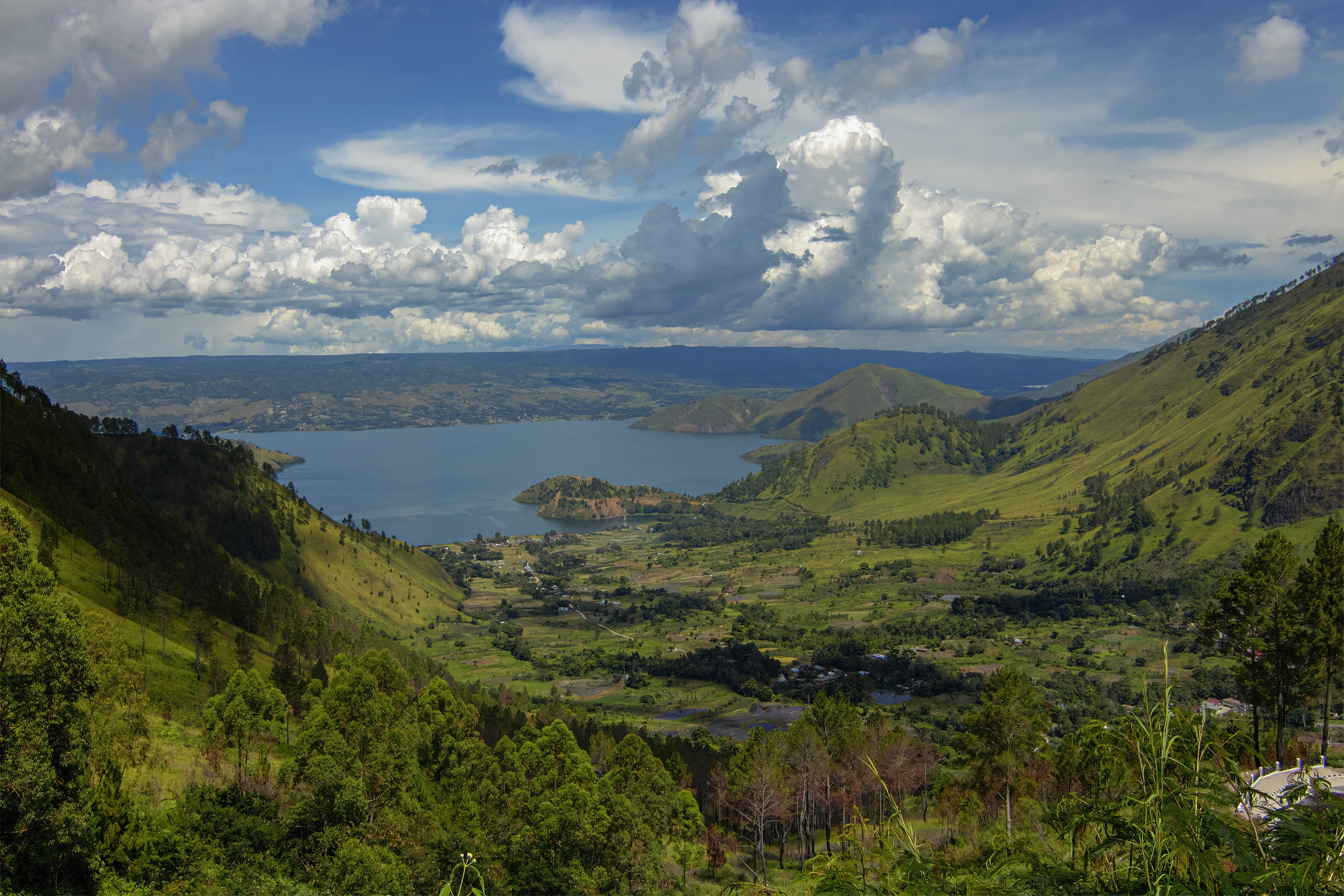
- A view of Lake Toba and Samosir Island

- Location within Indonesia Location within Sumatra
- Location: Balige, North Sumatra
- Coordinates: 2.68°N 98.88°E
- Type: Volcanic/tectonic
- Part of: Asahan Toba basin
- Primary outflows: Asahan River
- Basin countries: Indonesia
- Max. length: 100 km (62 mi)
- Max. width: 30 km (19 mi)
- Surface area: 1,130 km^{2} (440 sq mi)
- Average depth: 216 m (709 ft)
- Max. depth: 505 m (1,657 ft)
- Water volume: 244 km^{3} (59 cu mi)
- Surface elevation: 905 m (2,969 ft)
- Islands: Samosir (major); Hole, Sibandang, Tulas
- Settlements: Ambarita, Pangururan

Lake Toba (Indonesian: Danau Toba, Toba Batak: ᯖᯀᯬ ᯖᯬᯅ; romanized: Tao Toba) is a large natural lake in North Sumatra and Indonesia. The lake is the massive caldera of the Toba supervolcano. The lake is located in the middle of the northern part of the island of Sumatra, with a surface elevation of about 900 metres (2,953 ft), and stretches from 2.88°N 98.52°E to 2.35°N 99.1°E. The lake is about 100 kilometres (62 miles) long, 30 kilometres (19 mi) wide, and up to 505 metres (1,657 ft) deep. It is the largest lake in Indonesia and the largest volcanic lake in the world. Toba Caldera is one of the twenty geoparks in Indonesia, and was recognised in July 2020 as one of the UNESCO Global Geoparks.

Lake Toba is the site of a supervolcanic eruption estimated at VEI 8 that occurred 69,000 to 77,000 years ago, temporarily changing the earth's climate. Recent advances in dating methods suggest a more precise eruption date of 74,000 years ago. It is the largest-known explosive eruption on Earth in the last 25 million years.

A theory known as the Toba catastrophe theory postulates that this event held global consequences for Earth's human population. As the eruption likely would have killed most humans along with many other creatures living at the time, the theory suggests, it could account for an apparent population bottleneck in central east Africa and India around that time. A catastrophic loss of genetic diversity would affect the genetic make-up of humans worldwide, affecting human evolution to the present. More recent studies have cast doubt on this theory, as no evidence has emerged of lasting reductions in populations of humans and other fauna at the time. Other possibilities exist, including migration patterns, to account for apparent reductions in human genetic diversity.

It has also been suggested that the eruption of the Toba Caldera led to a volcanic winter with a worldwide decrease in temperature between 3 and 5 °C (5.4 and 9.0 °F), and up to 15 °C (27 °F) at higher latitudes. Additional studies in Lake Malawi in East Africa show significant amounts of ash deposits from the Toba Caldera eruptions even at that great distance, yet little indication of a significant climatic effect in East Africa.

== Geology ==
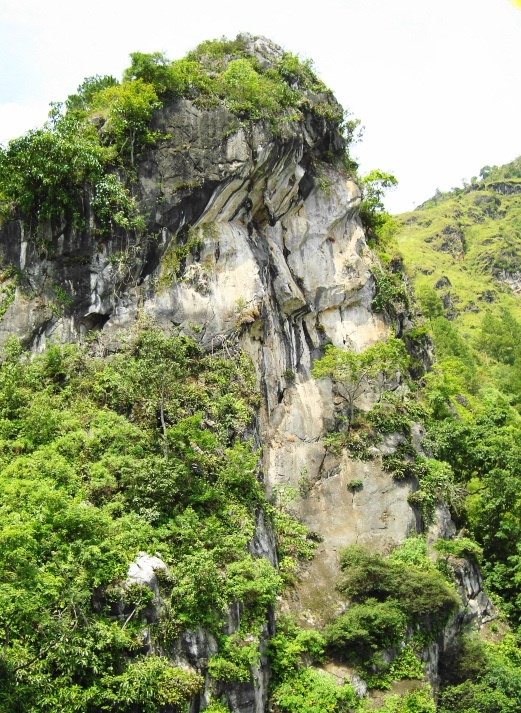
Batu Gantung (Hanging stone) in Lake Toba

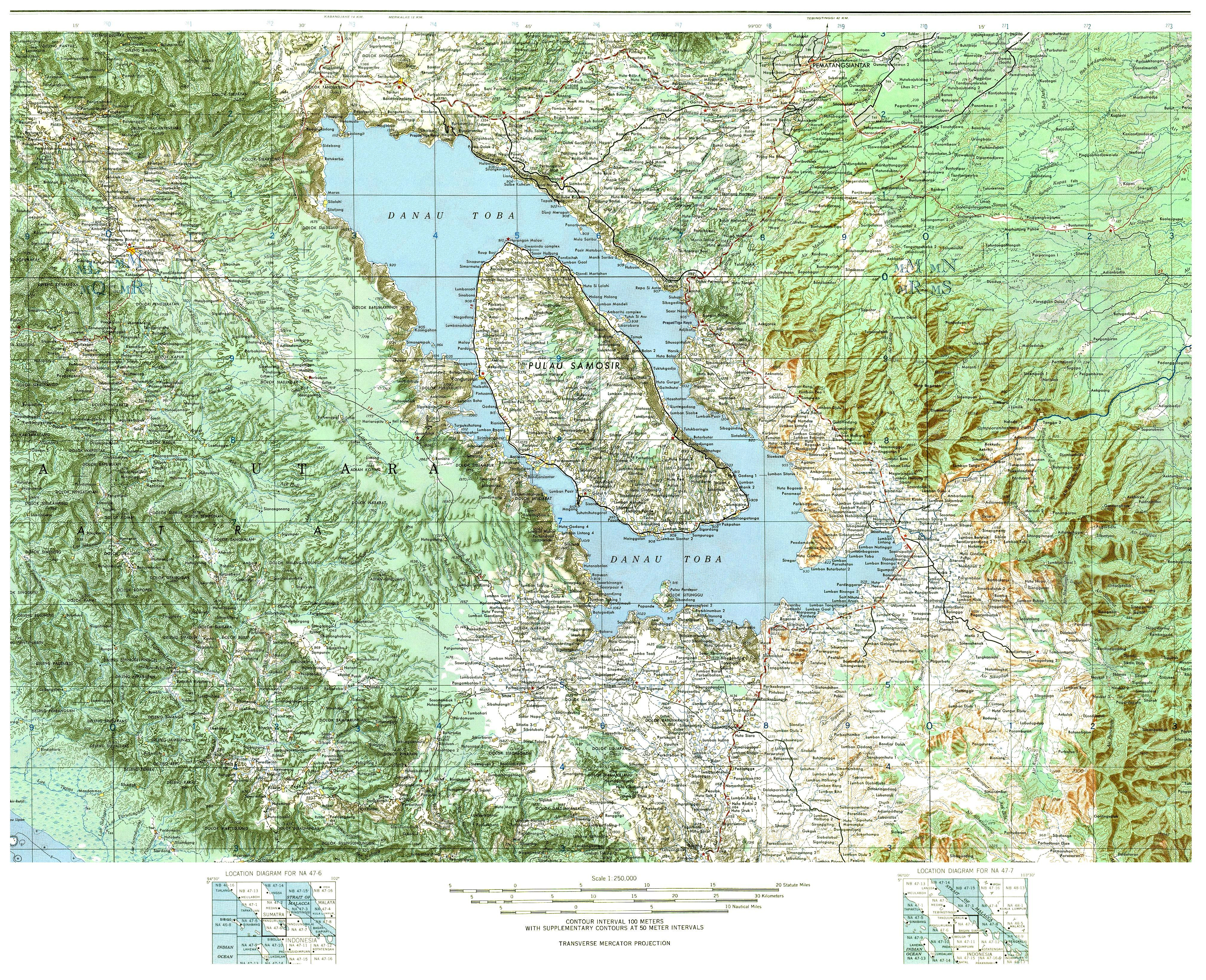
Map of the lake

The Toba Caldera in North Sumatra comprises four overlapping volcanic craters that adjoin the Sumatran "volcanic front". At 100 by 30 kilometres (62 by 19 mi) it is the world's largest Quaternary caldera, and the fourth and youngest caldera. It intersects the three older calderas. An estimated 2,800 km^{3} (670 cu mi) of dense-rock equivalent pyroclastic material, known as the youngest Toba tuff, was released during one of the largest explosive volcanic eruptions in recent geological history. Following this eruption, a resurgent dome formed within the new caldera, joining two half-domes separated by a longitudinal graben.

At least four cones, four stratovolcanoes, and three craters are visible in the lake. The Tandukbenua cone on the northwestern edge of the caldera has only sparse vegetation, suggesting a young age of several hundred years. Also, the Pusubukit (Hill Center) volcano (1,971 m (6,467 ft) above sea level) on the south edge of the caldera is solfatarically active.

The magma reservoir of the Toba supervolcano appears to consist of a layer of stacked magma sills, extending at least 7–30 kilometres (4.3–18.6 mi) beneath Samosir Island, in the center of the lake, and measuring 10–20 kilometres (6.2–12.4 mi) in diameter, with a shallow magma chamber sitting on top of the magma sills. This structure has been described as "magma pancakes", and similar structures are thought to potentially exist in the Taupō Supervolcano and Long Valley Caldera. The "magma pancakes" were uncovered through a study involving ambient seismic noise, and they are thought to be the driving force behind the Toba supervolcano's past supereruptions.

== Major eruption ==
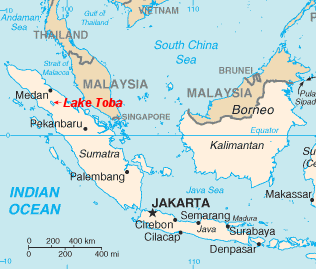
Location of Lake Toba shown in red on map

The Toba eruption (the Toba event) occurred at what is now Lake Toba about 73,700±300 years ago. It was the last in a series of at least four caldera-forming eruptions at this location, with the earlier known caldera having formed around 1.2 million years ago. This last eruption had an estimated VEI of 8, making it the largest-known explosive volcanic eruption in the Quaternary Period.

Bill Rose and Craig Chesner of Michigan Technological University have estimated that the total amount of material released in the eruption was at least 2,800 km^{3} (670 cu mi)—about 2,000 km^{3} (480 cu mi) of ignimbrite that flowed over the ground, and approximately 800 km^{3} (190 cu mi) that fell as ash mostly to the west. However, as more outcrops become available, Toba possibly erupted 3,200 km^{3} (770 cu mi) of ignimbrite and co-ignimbrite. The pyroclastic flows of the eruption destroyed an area of least 20,000 km^{2} (7,700 sq mi), with ash deposits as thick as 600 m (2,000 ft) by the main vent. The eruption was large enough to have deposited an ash layer approximately 15 cm (6 in) thick over all of South Asia; at one site in central India, the Toba ash layer today is up to 6 m (20 ft) thick and parts of Malaysia were covered with 9 m (30 ft) of ash fall.

The subsequent collapse formed a caldera that filled with water, creating Lake Toba. The island in the center of the lake is formed by a resurgent dome.

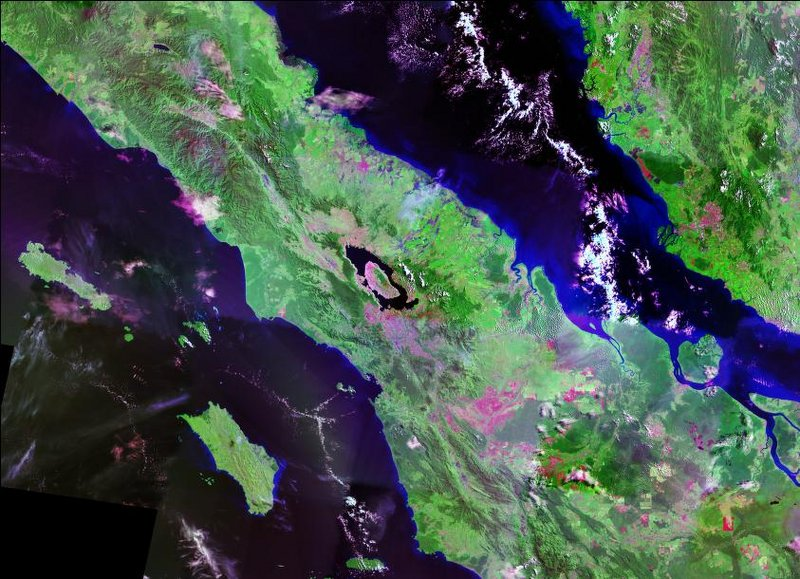
Landsat photo of Sumatra surrounding Lake Toba

The exact year of the eruption is unknown, but the pattern of ash deposits suggests that it occurred during the northern summer because only the summer monsoon could have deposited Toba ashfall in the South China Sea. The eruption lasted perhaps two weeks, and the ensuing volcanic winter resulted in a decrease in average global temperatures by 3.0 to 3.5 °C (5 to 6 °F) for several years. Ice cores from Greenland record a pulse of starkly reduced levels of organic carbon sequestration. Very few plants or animals in southeast Asia would have survived, and it is possible that the eruption caused a planet-wide die-off. However, the global cooling has been discussed by Rampino and Self. Their conclusion is that the cooling had already started before Toba's eruption. This conclusion was supported by Lane and Zielinski who studied the lake-core from Africa and GISP2. They concluded that there was no volcanic winter after the Toba eruption and that high H_{2}SO_{4} deposits do not cause long-term effects. Furthermore, due to the low solubility of sulfur in the magma, the emission of volatiles and climate impacts are likely limited.

Evidence from studies of mitochondrial DNA suggests that humans may have passed through a genetic bottleneck around this time that reduced genetic diversity below what would be expected given the age of the species. According to the Toba catastrophe theory, proposed by Stanley H. Ambrose of the University of Illinois at Urbana–Champaign in 1998, the effects of the Toba eruption may have decreased the size of human populations to only a few tens of thousands of individuals. However, this hypothesis is not widely accepted because similar effects on other animal species have not been observed, and paleoanthropology suggests there was no population bottleneck. The genetic bottleneck is now recognized to be the Out-of-Africa founder effect, rather than an actual reduction in population.

=== More recent activity ===
Since the major eruption ~70,000 years ago, eruptions of smaller magnitude have also occurred at Toba. The small cone of Pusukbukit formed on the southwestern margin of the caldera and lava domes. The most recent eruption may have been at Tandukbenua on the northwestern caldera edge, suggested by a lack of vegetation that could be due to an eruption within the last few hundred years.

Some parts of the caldera have shown uplift due to partial refilling of the magma chamber, for example, pushing Samosir Island and the Uluan Peninsula above the surface of the lake. The lake sediments on Samosir Island show that it has risen by at least 450 m (1,476 ft) since the cataclysmic eruption. Such uplifts are common in very large calderas, apparently due to the upward pressure of below-ground magma. Toba is probably the largest resurgent caldera on Earth. Large earthquakes have recently occurred in the vicinity of the volcano, notably in 1987 along the southern shore of the lake at a depth of 11 km (6.8 mi). Such earthquakes have also been recorded in 1892, 1916, and 1920–1922.

In 2016, a study revealed that the Toba Supervolcano has a magma chamber containing 50,000 cubic kilometres (12,000 mi^{3}) of eruptible magma, about 30–50 kilometres (19–31 mi) underground. This makes the supervolcano's magma chamber more than four times larger than the volume of Lake Superior in North America, and also larger than the magma chamber underneath Yellowstone.

Lake Toba lies near the Great Sumatran fault, which runs along the centre of Sumatra in the Sumatra fracture zone. The volcanoes of Sumatra and Java are part of the Sunda Arc, a result of the northeasterly movement of the Indo-Australian plate, which is sliding under the eastward-moving Eurasian plate. The subduction zone in this area is very active: the seabed near the west coast of Sumatra has had several major earthquakes since 1995, including the 9.1 2004 Indian Ocean earthquake and the 8.7 2005 Nias–Simeulue earthquake, the epicenters of which were around 300 km (190 mi) from Toba.

== People ==
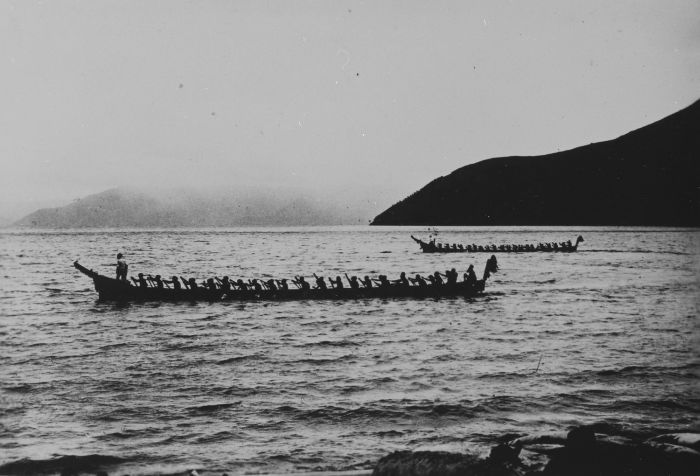
Batak canoes near Haranggaol on Lake Toba (circa 1920)

Most of the people who live around Lake Toba are ethnically Bataks. Traditional Batak houses are noted for their distinctive roofs (which curve upwards at each end, as a boat's hull does) and their colorful decor.

== Transportation ==
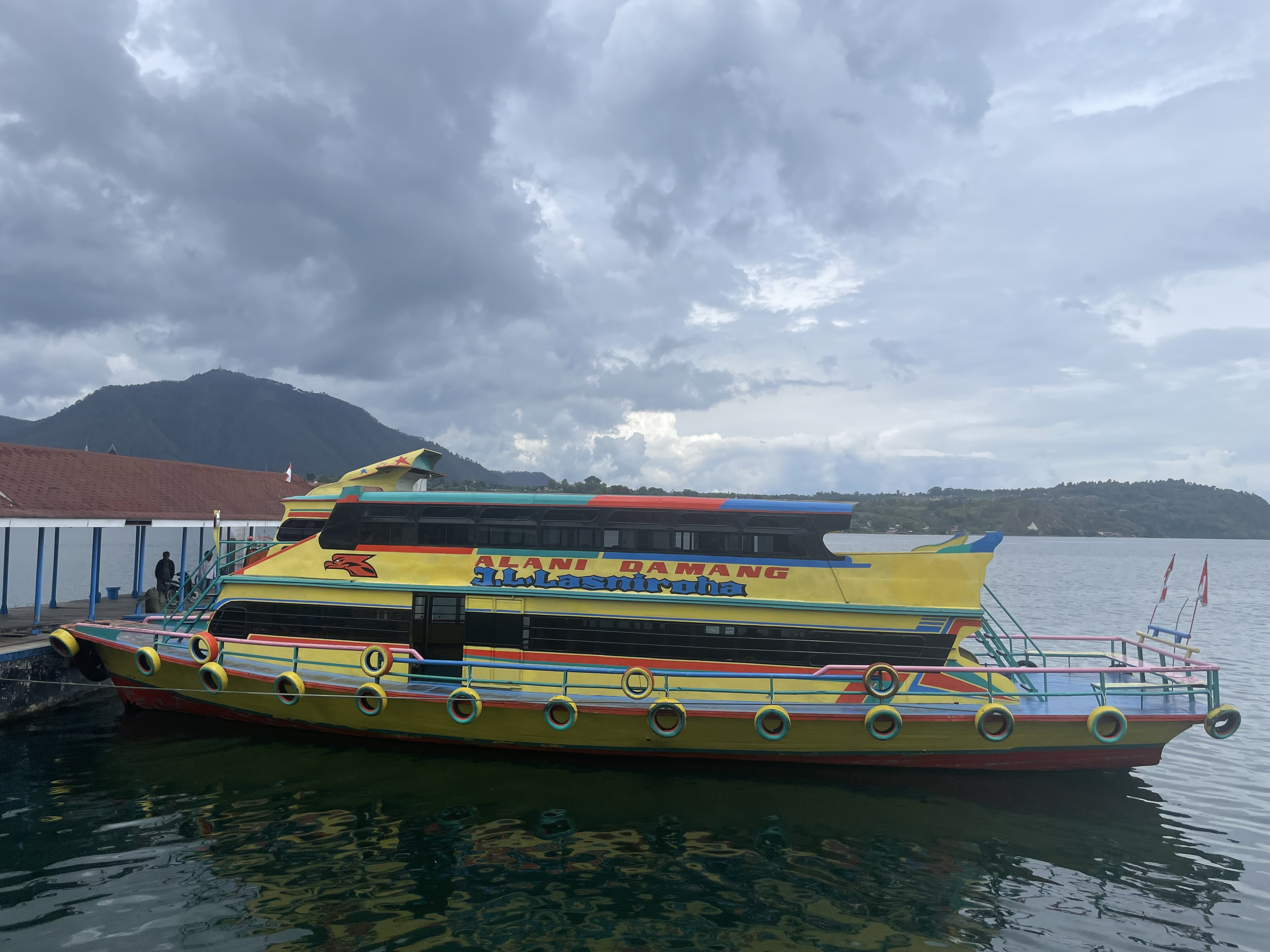
Ferry boats on Lake Toba

Parapat is located on the edge of the lake, which is the transit point to travel the lake and Samosir Island. Medan is about 173 km by road from the town and is connected via the Trans-Sumatran Highway to Pematang Siantar by a 48 km road. Sisingamangaraja XII International Airport is located about 76 km from Parapat.

== Flora and fauna ==
The flora of the lake includes various types of phytoplankton, emerged macrophytes, floating macrophytes, and submerged macrophytes, while the surrounding countryside is rainforest including areas of Sumatran tropical pine forests on the higher mountainsides.

The fauna includes several species of zooplankton and benthic animals. Since the lake is oligotrophic (nutrient-poor), the native fish fauna is relatively scarce, and the only endemics are Rasbora tobana (strictly speaking near-endemic, since also found in some tributary rivers that run into the lake) and Neolissochilus thienemanni, locally known as the Batak fish. The latter species is threatened by deforestation (causing siltation), pollution, changes in water level and the numerous fish species that have been introduced to the lake. Other native fishes include species such as Aplocheilus panchax, Nemacheilus pfeifferae, Homaloptera gymnogaster, Channa gachua, Channa striata, Clarias batrachus, Barbonymus gonionotus, Barbonymus schwanenfeldii, Danio albolineatus, Osteochilus vittatus, Puntius binotatus, Rasbora jacobsoni, Tor tambra, Betta imbellis, Betta taeniata and Monopterus albus. Among the many introduced species are Anabas testudineus, Oreochromis mossambicus, Oreochromis niloticus, Ctenopharyngodon idella, Cyprinus carpio, Osphronemus goramy, Trichogaster pectoralis, Trichopodus trichopterus, Poecilia reticulata and Xiphophorus hellerii.

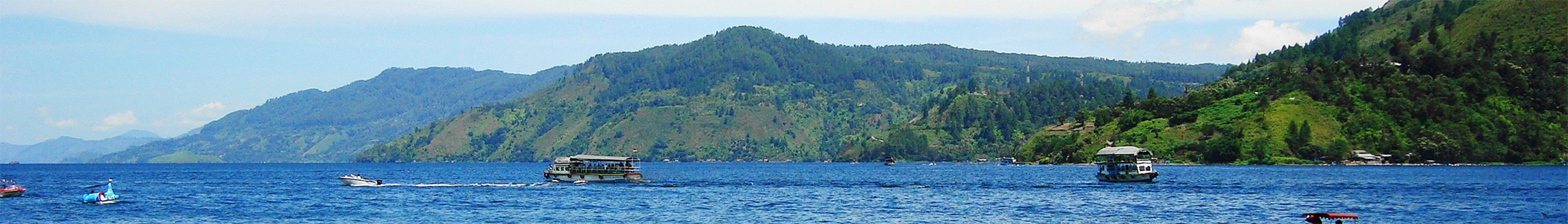
Panoramic view of Lake Toba

== Sinking of MV Sinar Bangun ==
On 18 June 2018, Lake Toba was the scene of a ferry disaster, in which over 160 people drowned. MV Sinar Bangun was an irregular operating vessel on the lake which capsized with many passengers on board. The incident caused the death of 167 people and injuries to a number of others. Preliminary reports found the vessel was in operation with irregularities. Ignoring overloading on the vessel and operating in rough weather conditions were concluded to be the main reasons leading to the disaster.

== In popular culture ==
The Origin of Lake Toba is a folk story about the lake, in which once upon a time, there was a fisherman who caught a golden fish. Samosir Island is believed to be the golden fish's son.

== Gallery ==
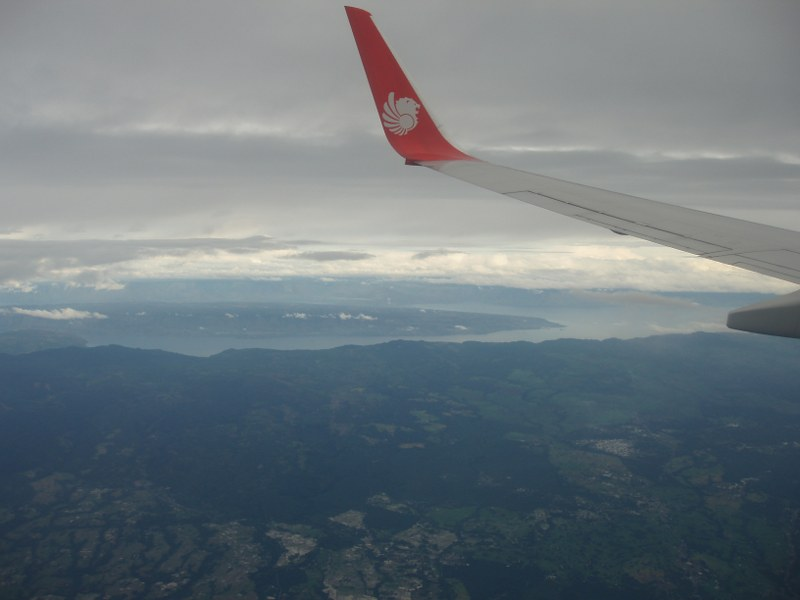
Lake Toba Aerial View

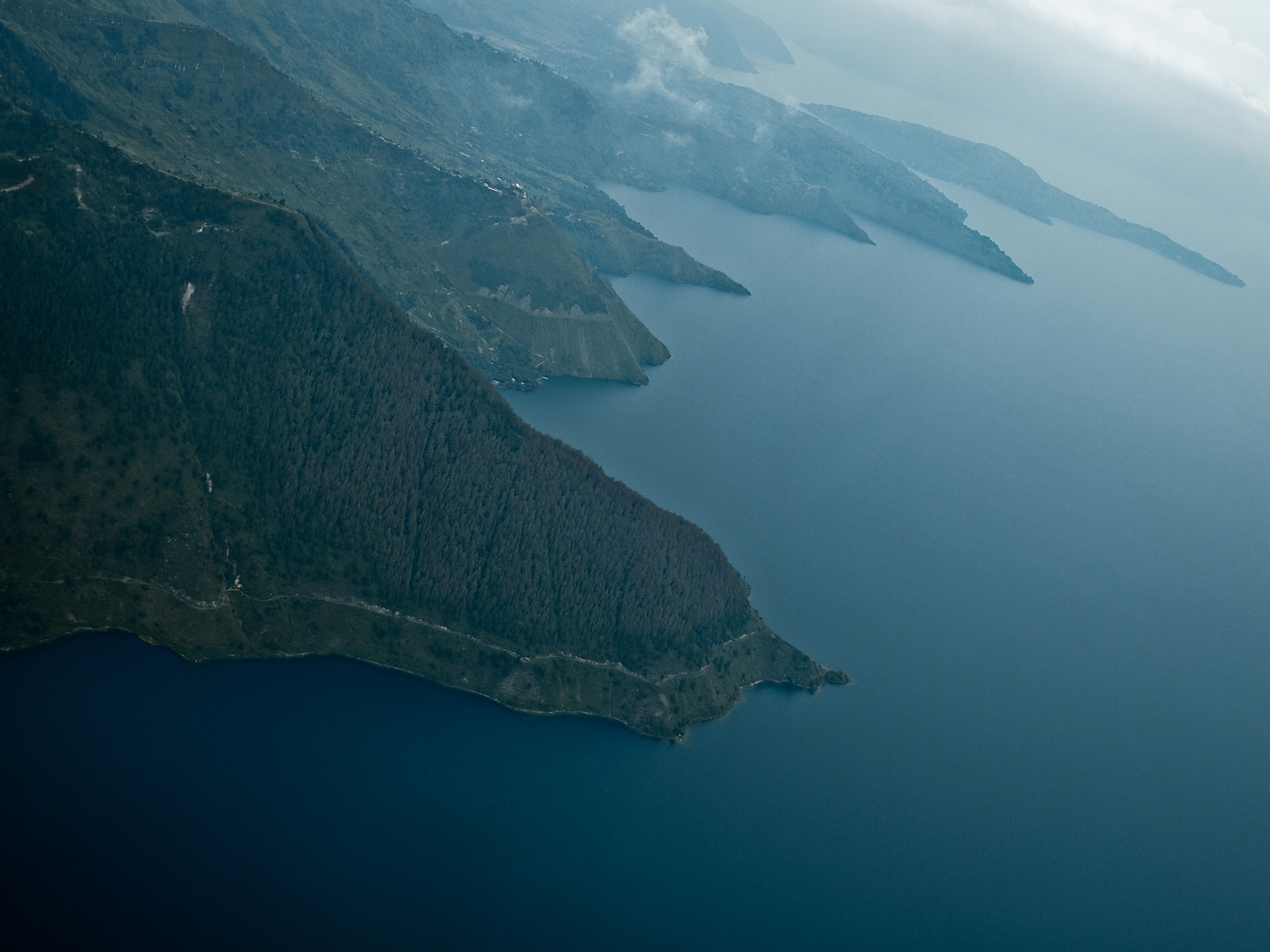
Aerial view of the southern shore with Sibandang Island visible in the background

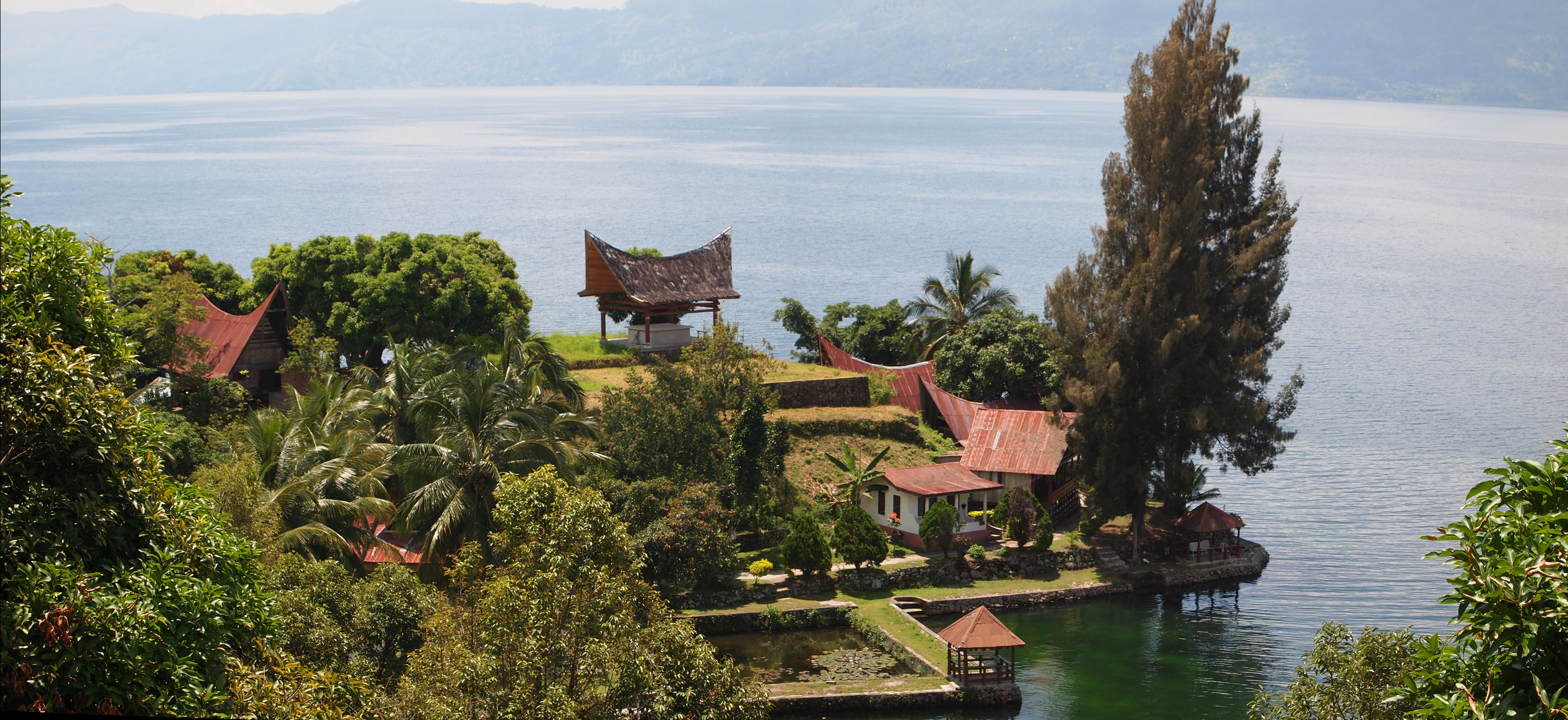
View of the lake with an example of Batak architecture in the foreground

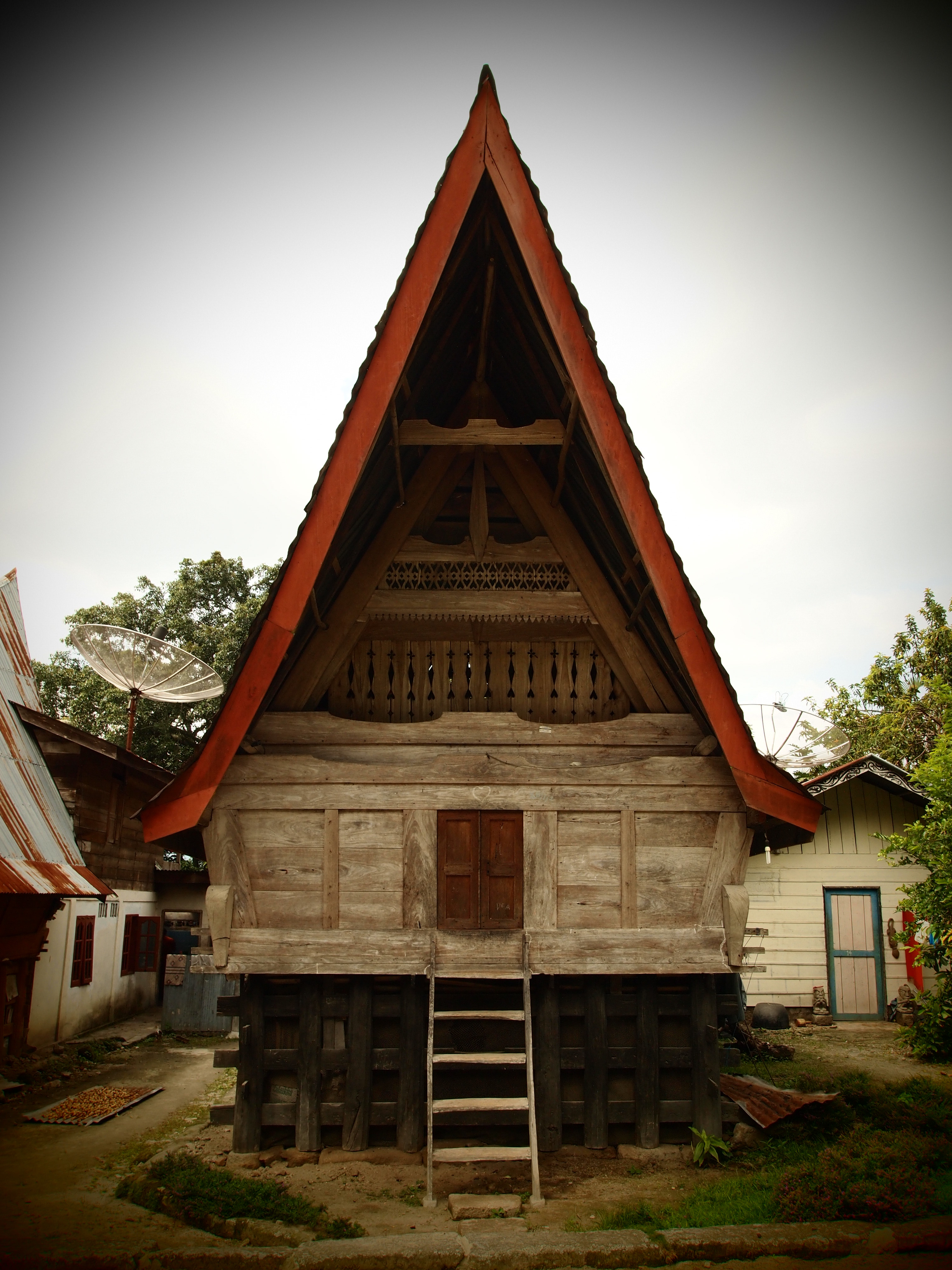
Traditional Batak house at Ambarita, Lake Toba

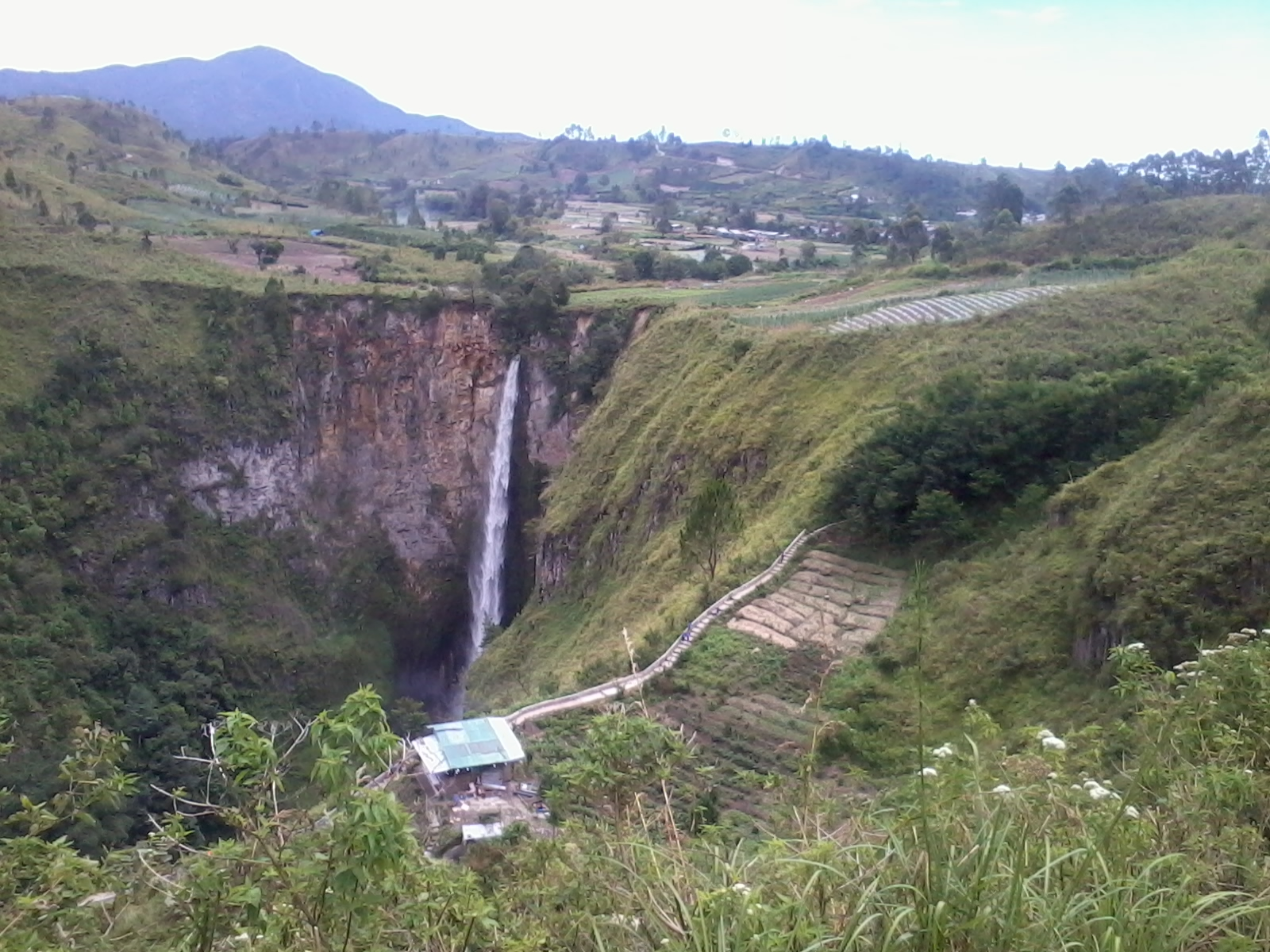
Sipiso-Piso Waterfall

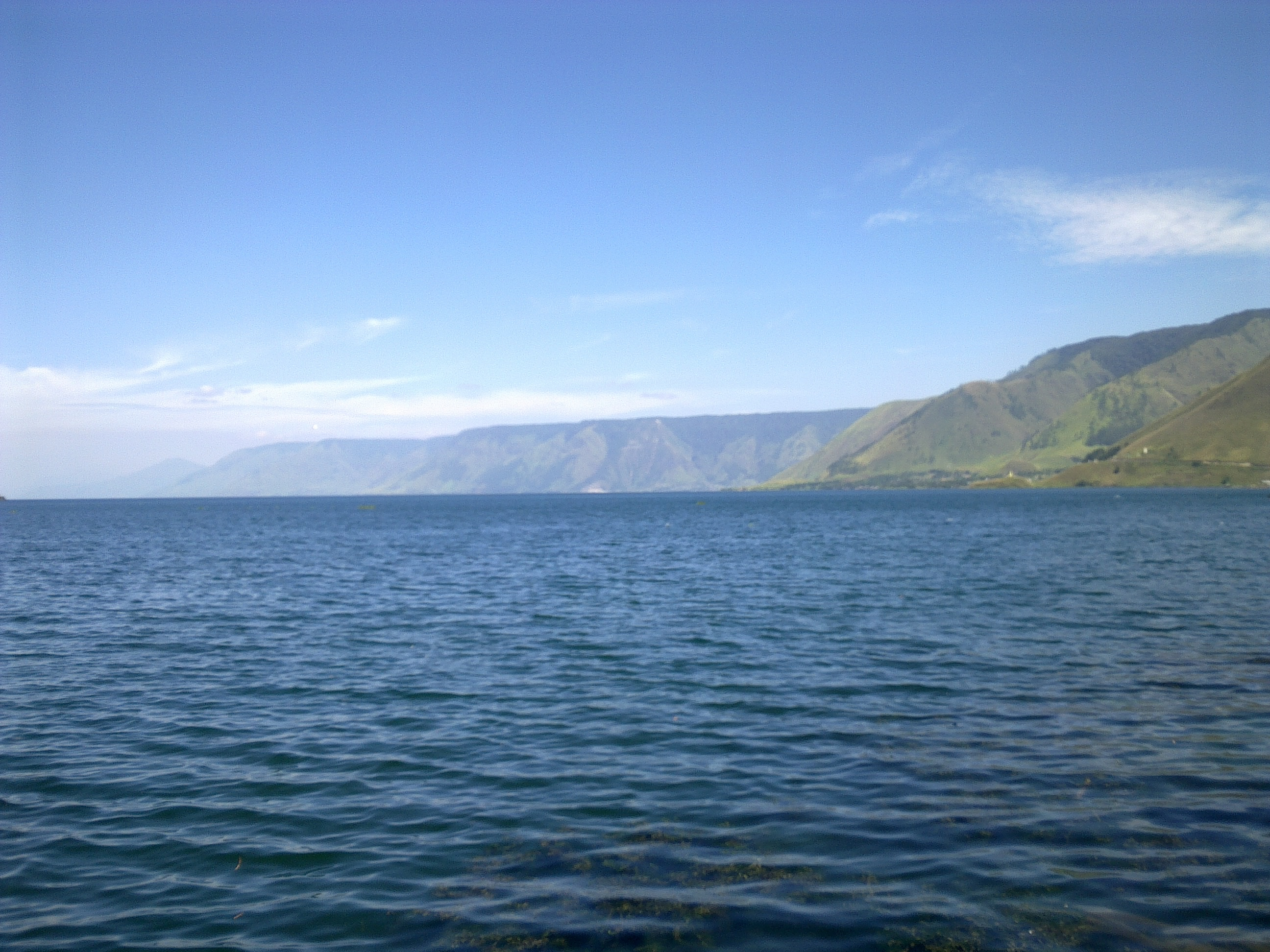
Lake Toba from Tongging Village, near Sipiso-Piso Waterfall

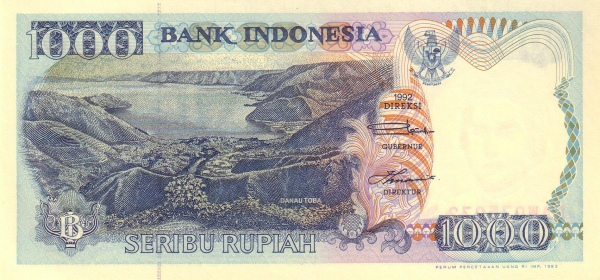
Lake Toba featured in 1,000-rupiah banknote

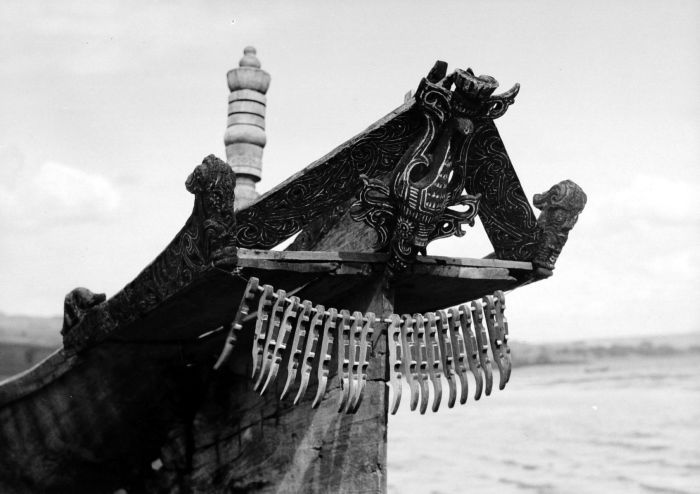
Details of carvings on the prow of a Toba Batak canoe

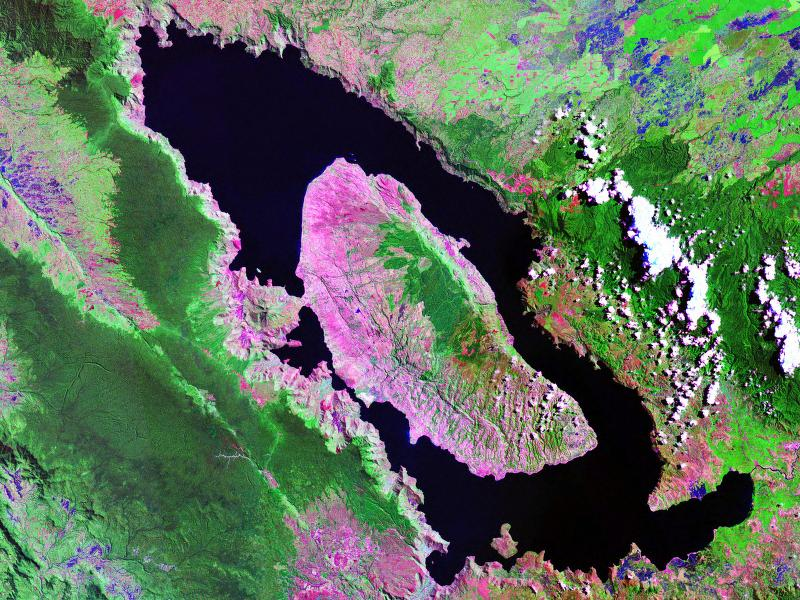
The caldera of Lake Toba, with a resurgent dome, forming Samosir Island

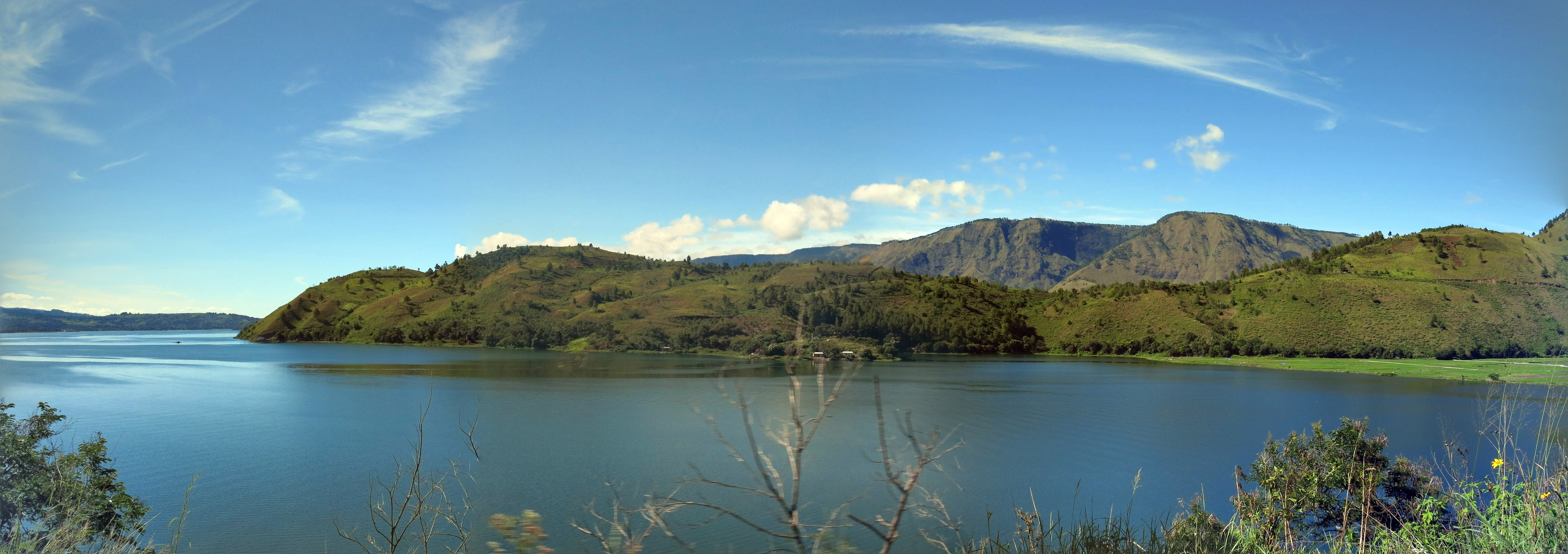
A panoramic partial view of Toba Lake, as seen from the west side to the southeast

== See also ==
- List of lakes of Indonesia
- List of volcanoes in Indonesia
- Samosir Island
- Batak people
- Nias people
