= Medan–Kualanamu–Tebing Tinggi Toll Road =

Toll Road in Indonesia

Medan–Kuala Namu–Tebing Tinggi Toll Road
- MKTT Toll Road
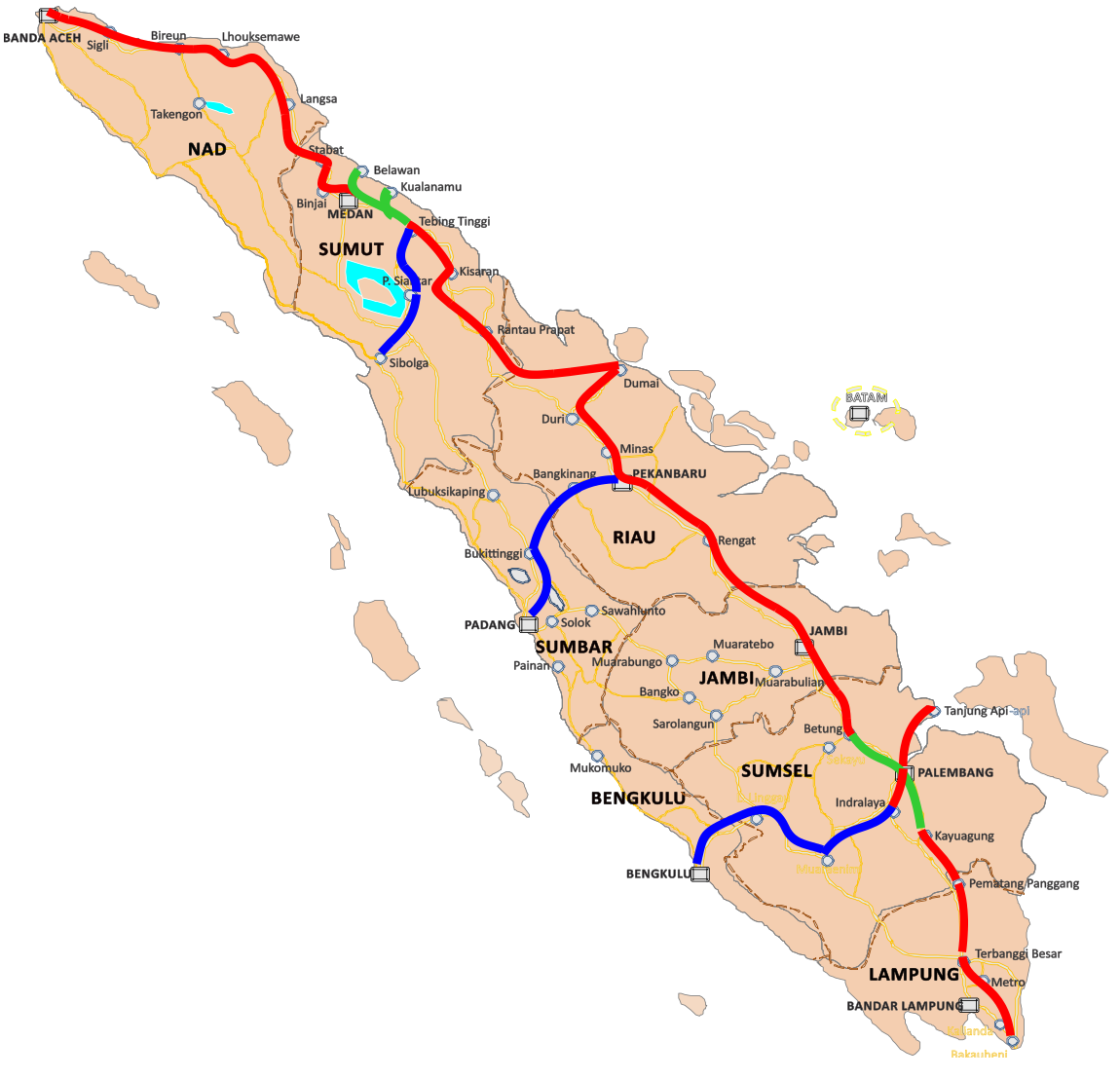

Route information
- Part of AH25
- Maintained by PT Jasamarga Kualanamu Tol (PT Jasa Marga Tbk, Waskita Karya Group (Waskita and Waskita Toll Road), PT PP)
- Length: 61.8 km (38.4 mi)
- Existed: 2014–present

Major junctions
- Northwest end: Tanjung Morawa Interchange
- Belmera Toll Road; Kuala Tanjung-Tebing Tinggi-Parapat Toll Road (Planned)
- Southeast end: Tebing Tinggi

Location
- Country: Indonesia
- Major cities: Deli Serdang Regency; Serdang Bedagai Regency; Tebing Tinggi

Highway system
- Transport in Indonesia

The Medan–Kuala Namu–Tebing Tinggi Toll Road or MKTT toll road is an controlled-access toll road that connects Medan, Kualanamu International Airport and Tebing Tinggi, in Sumatra, Indonesia. This toll road is part of Trans-Sumatra Toll Road network. The toll road also connects the industrial area in Medan, Kualanamu International Airport, Kuala Tanjung Port, Sei Mangkei Special Economic Zone and the access to Lake Toba.

== Sections ==
It is in two sections:

- Section-1 Medan–Perbarakan–Kuala Namu, 17.8 kilometers. Section I was built by the Indonesian government. The first stone laying of the commencement of the construction was carried out on 23 September 2014 and is now operational.
- Section-2 Perbarakan–Tebing Tinggi, 44.0 kilometers. Section II was built by the Consortium of BUMN consisting of Jasa Marga, Pembangunan Perumahan, Waskita Karya, and Hutama Karya.

== Exits ==
=== Tanjung Morawa-Tebing Tinggi Section ===
Province	Location	km	mi	Exit	Name	Destinations	Notes
North Sumatra	Tanjung Morawa, Deli Serdang Regency	32.4	20.1	Belawan–Medan–Tanjung Morawa Toll Road			
North Sumatra	Tanjung Morawa, Deli Serdang Regency	33.2	20.6	32	Tanjung Morawa Toll Gate	Tanjung Morawa	Northwestern terminus
North Sumatra	Pagar Merbau, Deli Serdang Regency	42.3	26.3	42	Perbarakan Link	Paluh Kemiri; Kualanamu International Airport	
North Sumatra	Pagar Merbau, Deli Serdang Regency	46.7	29.0	46	Lubuk Pakam Toll Gate	Lubuk Pakam	
North Sumatra	Perbaungan, Serdang Bedagai Regency	59.7	37.1	60	Perbaungan Toll Gate	Perbaungan; Pegajahan; Bengkel	
North Sumatra	Teluk Mengkudu, Serdang Bedagai Regency	69.2	43.0	69	Teluk Mengkudu Toll Gate	Teluk Mengkudu; Katapao	
North Sumatra	Sei Rampah, Serdang Bedagai Regency	77.2	48.0	77	Sei Rampah Toll Gate	Sei Rampah; Penggalangan	
North Sumatra	Tebing Tinggi, Serdang Bedagai Regency	85.9	53.4	Tebing Tinggi Toll Gate			
North Sumatra	Tebing Tinggi, Serdang Bedagai Regency	87.0	54.1	87	Tebing Tinggi Ramp	Tebing Tinggi (Serdang Bedagai); Tebing Tinggi City	Southeastern terminus
1.000 mi = 1.609 km; 1.000 km = 0.621 mi: Electronic toll collection; Route transition; Continues south-east bound as Kisaran-Indrapura Toll Road

=== Perbarakan Link ===
Province	Location	km	mi	Exit	Name	Destinations	Notes
North Sumatra	Tanjung Morawa, Deli Serdang Regency	0.0	0.0	0	Kualanamu Ramp	Batang Kuis; Kualanamu International Airport	Northern terminus
North Sumatra	Tanjung Morawa, Deli Serdang Regency	0.4	0.25	Kualanamu Toll Gate			
North Sumatra	Tanjung Morawa, Deli Serdang Regency	3.4	2.1	3	Kemiri Toll Gate	Paluh Kemiri; Lubuk Pakam	
North Sumatra	Pagar Merbau, Deli Serdang Regency	6.2	3.9	6	Perbarakan Interchange	Eastbound; Lubuk Pakam; Perbaungan; Tebing Tinggi; Eastbound; Tanjung Morawa; Belawan–Medan–Tanjung Morawa Toll Road	Southern terminus
1.000 mi = 1.609 km; 1.000 km = 0.621 mi: Electronic toll collection; Route transition

== Toll Fare ==
=== Tanjung Morawa-Tebing Tinggi Section ===
Origin	Destination	Toll Rate		
Origin	Destination	Category I	Category II and III	Category IV and V
Tanjung Morawa	Lubuk Pakam	Rp 17,000	Rp 25,500	Rp 34,000
	Perbaungan	Rp 30,500	Rp 46,000	Rp 61,500
	Teluk Mengkudu	Rp 41,000	Rp 61,500	Rp 82,000
	Sei Rampah	Rp 49,500	Rp 74,500	Rp 99,500
	Tebing Tinggi	Rp 60,000	Rp 89,500	Rp 119,500
Lubuk Pakam	Tanjung Morawa	Rp 17,000	Rp 25,500	Rp 34,000
	Perbaungan	Rp 13.500	Rp 20,500	Rp 27,000
	Teluk Mengkudu	Rp 24,000	Rp 36,000	Rp 48,000
	Sei Rampah	Rp 32,500	Rp 49,000	Rp 65,000
	Tebing Tinggi	Rp 42,500	Rp 64,000	Rp 85,500
Perbaungan	Tanjung Morawa	Rp 30,500	Rp 46,000	Rp 61,500
	Lubuk Pakam	Rp 13,500	Rp 20,500	Rp 27,000
	Teluk Mengkudu	Rp 10,500	Rp 15,500	Rp 21,000
	Sei Rampah	Rp 19,000	Rp 28,500	Rp 38,000
	Tebing Tinggi	Rp 29,000	Rp 44,000	Rp 58,500
Teluk Mengkudu	Tanjung Morawa	Rp 41,000	Rp 61,500	Rp 82,000
	Lubuk Pakam	Rp 24,000	Rp 36,000	Rp 48,000
	Perbaungan	Rp 10,500	Rp 15,500	Rp 21,000
	Sei Rampah	Rp 8,500	Rp 13,000	Rp 17,000
	Tebing Tinggi	Rp 18,500	Rp 28,000	Rp 37,500
Sei Rampah	Tanjung Morawa	Rp 49,500	Rp 74,500	Rp 99,500
	Lubuk Pakam	Rp 32,500	Rp 49,000	Rp 65,000
	Perbaungan	Rp 19,000	Rp 28,500	Rp 38,000
	Teluk Mengkudu	Rp 8,500	Rp 13,000	Rp 17,000
	Tebing Tinggi	Rp 10,000	Rp 15,000	Rp 20,500
Tebing Tinggi	Tanjung Morawa	Rp 60,000	Rp 89,500	Rp 119,500
	Lubuk Pakam	Rp 42,500	Rp 64,000	Rp 85,500
	Perbaungan	Rp 29,000	Rp 44,000	Rp 58,500
	Teluk Mengkudu	Rp 18,500	Rp 28,000	Rp 37,500
	Sei Rampah	Rp 10,000	Rp 15,000	Rp 20,500

== See also ==
- Trans-Sumatra Toll Road
