= Belawan–Medan–Tanjung Morawa Toll Road =

Toll Road in Indonesia

Belawan–Medan–Tanjung Morawa Toll Road Belmera Toll Road Jalan Tol Belmera
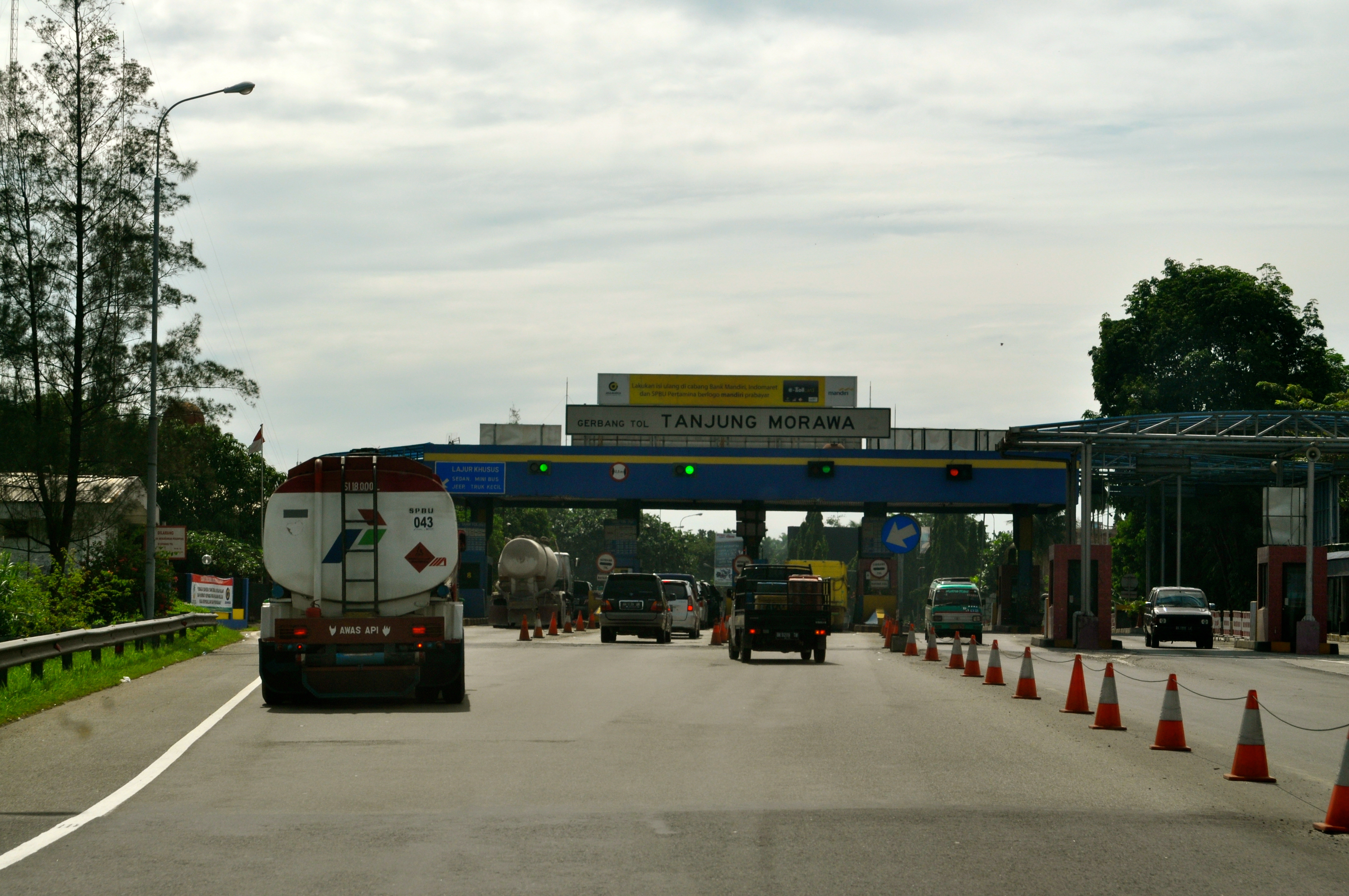
- Tanjung Morawa Toll Gate

Route information
- Part of AH25
- Maintained by PT Jasa Marga Tbk
- Length: 34.4 km (21.4 mi)
- Existed: December 15, 1986–present

Major junctions
- North end: Port of Belawan
- Medan–Binjai Toll Road; Medan–Kualanamu–Tebing Tinggi Toll Road
- Southeast end: Tanjung Morawa

Location
- Country: Indonesia
- Major cities: Medan; Deli Serdang Regency

Highway system
- Transport in Indonesia

Belawan–Medan–Tanjung Morawa Toll Road or Belmera Toll Road is a controlled-access toll road in the east part of Medan in Indonesia that connects Belawan to Tanjung Morawa. Completed on December 15, 1986 and operated by PT Jasa Marga, this is the first toll road in Indonesia outside Java.

== History ==
The toll road, which connects Port of Belawan and Tanjung Morawa in Deli Serdang Regency was built by contractors Takenaka Nippon Hutama and Pacific Consultant International and inaugurated in December 15, 1986, becoming the first toll road to be built in Sumatra. The toll road has a length of 34 km (21 mi) with 2 lanes in each direction.

== Exits ==
Province	Location	km	mi	Exit	Name	Destinations	Notes
North Sumatra	Medan Kota Belawan, Medan	0.0	0.0	0	Port of Belawan	Port of Belawan	Northern terminus
North Sumatra	Medan Labuhan, Medan	4	2.5	Belawan Toll Gate			
North Sumatra	Percut Sei Tuan, Deli Serdang Regency	10.5	6.5	10	Mabar Toll Gate	Mabar; Medan Industrial Complex; Martubung	
North Sumatra	Medan Deli, Medan	13.0	8.1	13	Tanjung Mulia Interchange	Tanjung Mulia; Helvetia; Medan–Binjai Toll Road	
North Sumatra	Percut Sei Tuan, Deli Serdang Regency	16.6	10.3	17	Haji Anif Toll Gate	Cemara; Pancing; Percut	
North Sumatra	Percut Sei Tuan, Deli Serdang Regency	21.2	13.2	21	Bandar Selamat Toll Gate	Bandar Selamat; Tembung	
North Sumatra	Percut Sei Tuan, Deli Serdang Regency	27.2	16.9	27	Amplas Toll Gate	Medan Amplas; Patumbak	
North Sumatra	Tanjung Morawa, Deli Serdang Regency	32.3	20.1	33	Tanjung Morawa Toll Gate	Tanjung Morawa	Southeastern terminus
North Sumatra	Tanjung Morawa, Deli Serdang Regency	33.2	20.6	Medan–Kualanamu–Tebing Tinggi Toll Road			
1.000 mi = 1.609 km; 1.000 km = 0.621 mi: Electronic toll collection; Route transition

== See also ==
- List of toll roads in Indonesia
- Trans-Sumatra Toll Road
- Transport in Indonesia
