= Medan–Binjai Toll Road =

Toll road in Indonesia

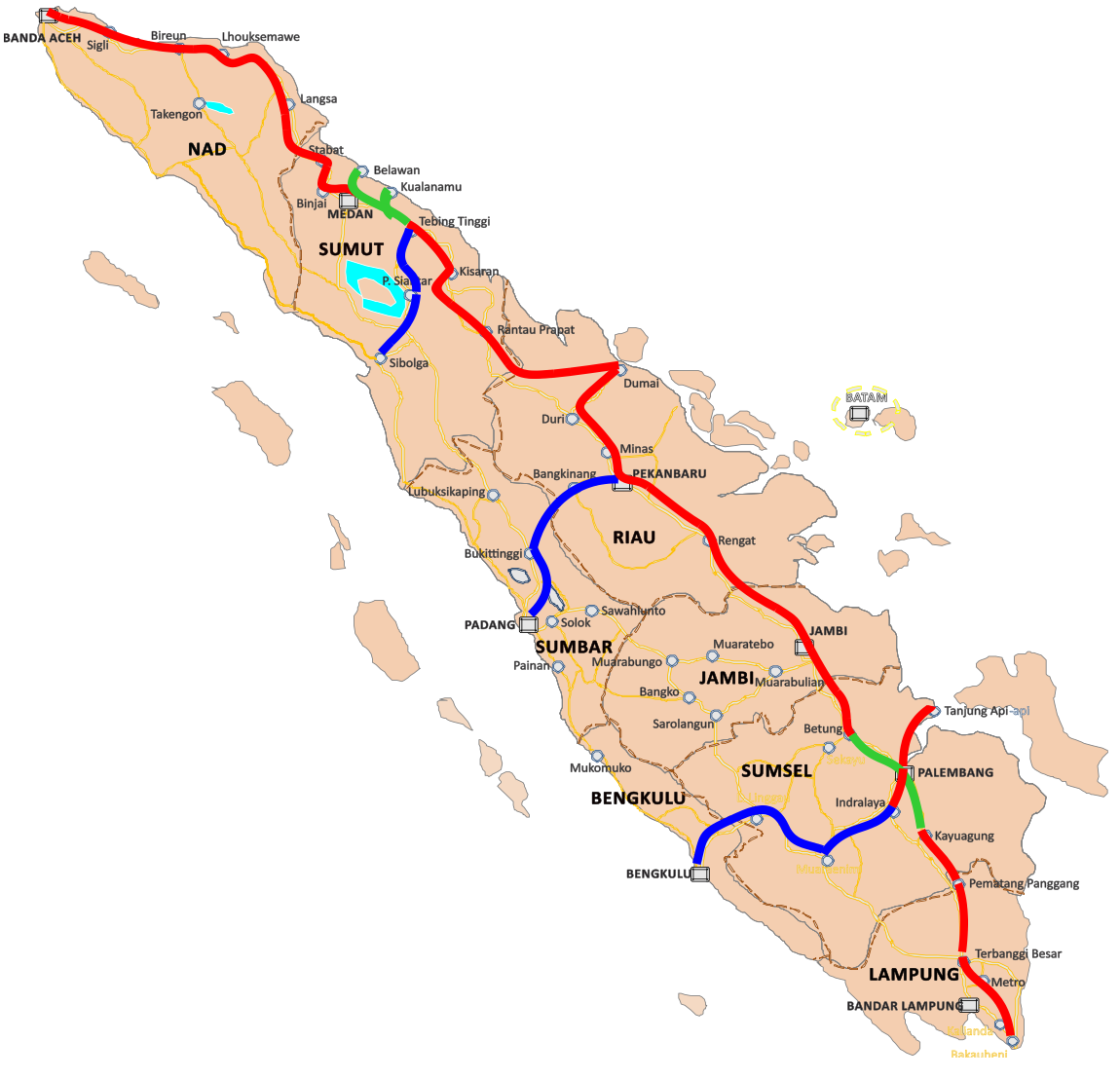

Route information
- Part of AH25
- Maintained by PT Hutama Karya (Persero) as part of a government-granted monopoly on the Trans-Sumatra Toll Road system
- Length: 17 km (11 mi)
- Existed: 2019–present

Major junctions
- From: Medan
- Belawan–Medan–Tanjung Morawa Toll Road
- To: Binjai

Location
- Country: Indonesia
- Major cities: Medan; Deli Serdang Regency; Binjai

Highway system
- Transport in Indonesia

Medan–Binjai Toll Road is a controlled-access toll road connecting to Medan from Binjai. This toll road is part of Banda Aceh-Medan corridor of Trans-Sumatra Toll Road network.

== History ==
On October 10, 2014, the construction of this toll road was inaugurated by the Coordinating Minister for the Economy Chairul Tanjung. While the groundbreaking ceremony was carried out by President Joko Widodo on 27 January 2015. The construction of this toll road was planned to last for 3 years.

The Medan–Kualanamu–Tebing Tinggi Toll Road and Medan–Binjai Toll Road were officially operational after being inaugurated by President Joko Widodo on October 13, 2017. Even though they are already in operation, not all toll roads can be traversed due to land acquisition constraints.

== Sections ==
The toll road is 17 kilometers long, with sections below,

- Helvetia-Binjai-Semayang: 10.45 kilometers
- Tanjung Mulia-Helvetia: 6.75 kilometers

== Exits ==
Because this expressway is a part of Trans-Sumatra Toll Road Network, the KM 0 exit is located at the Bakauheni Port. For the sake of simplicity, the distance counter will start around Tanjung Mulia Junction/IC

Province	Location	km	mi	Exit	Name	Destinations	Notes
North Sumatera	Medan Deli, Medan	0	0.0	14	Tanjung Mulia Interchange	Belmera Toll Road; Northbound; Mabar; Port of Belawan; Southbound; Cemara; Tanjung Morawa; Tanjung Mulia Toll Gate; Tanjung Mulia; Pulo Brayan	Eastern terminus, End of Toll Route Sumatera 2, Start of Toll Route Sumatera 1
North Sumatera	Labuhan Deli, Deli Serdang Regency	1.89	1.17	1	Marelan Ramp	Marelan; Medan	Eastbound exit, westbound entrance only
North Sumatera	Sunggal, Deli Serdang Regency	4.65	2.89	4	Helvetia Toll Gate	Helvetia	
North Sumatera	Sunggal, Deli Serdang Regency	10.81	6.72	10	Semayang Toll Gate	Semayang	
North Sumatera	Sunggal, Deli Serdang Regency	14.96	9.30	14	Binjai Toll Gate	Binjai	Western terminus
1.000 mi = 1.609 km; 1.000 km = 0.621 mi: Incomplete access; Route transition

== See also ==
- Trans-Sumatra Toll Road
