= Tebing Tinggi (disambiguation) =

Tebing Tinggi is a city in North Sumatra.

Tebing Tinggi may also refer to:

- Tebing Tinggi Island, island in Riau
- Tebing Tinggi, the town and district in Empat Lawang Regency
- Tebing Tinggi, Serdang Bedagai, district in Serdang Bedagai Regency
- Tebing Tinggi (state constituency), state constituency in Perak, Malaysia
