= Trans-Sulawesi Highway =

Road in Indonesia

- Jalan Raya Trans-Sulawesi
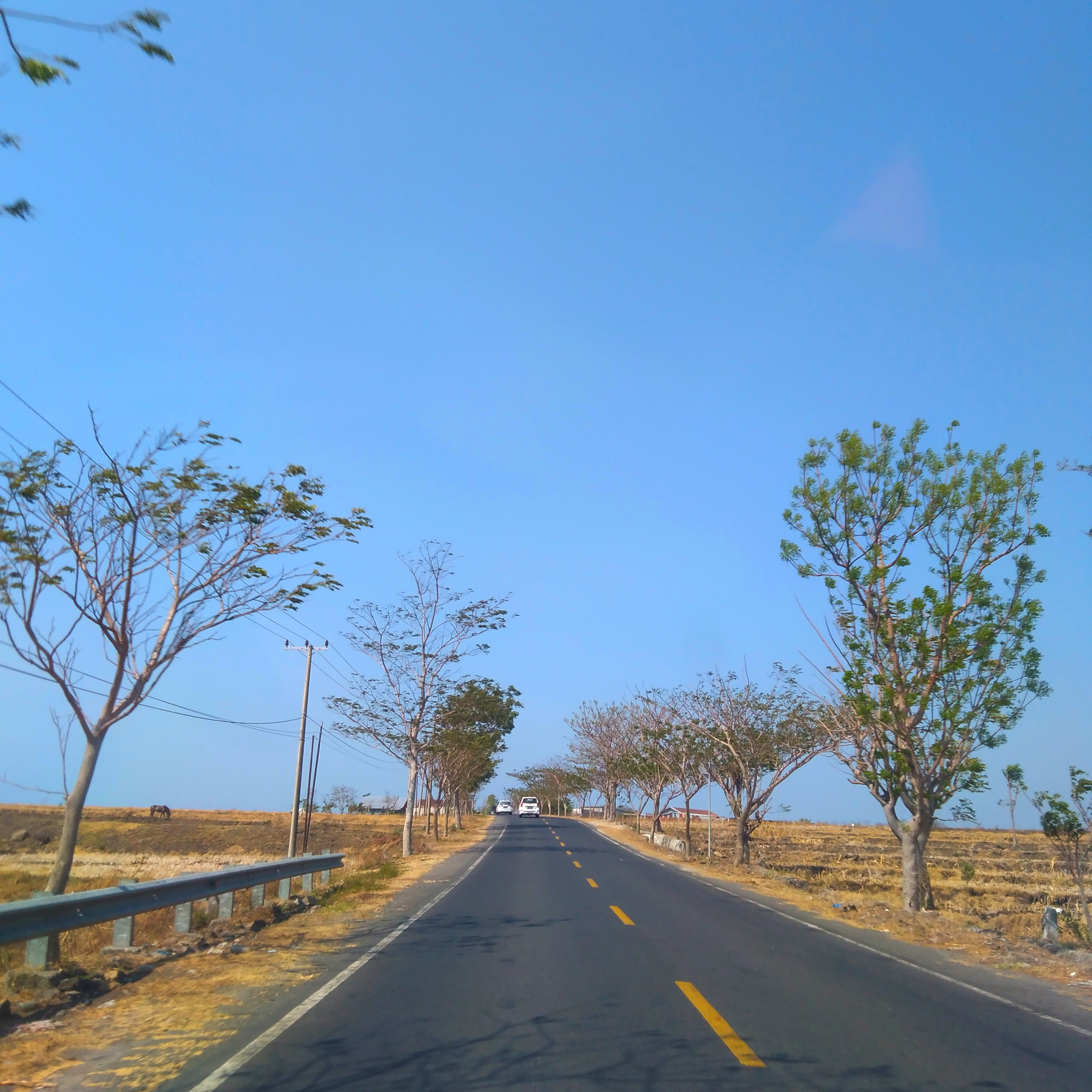

Route information
- Length: 2,000 km (1,200 mi)
- History: Partially completed

Major junctions
- North end: Manado
- South end: Makassar

Location
- Country: Indonesia

Highway system
- Transport in Indonesia

Trans-Sulawesi Highway (Indonesian: Jalan Raya Trans-Sulawesi) is an under construction highway which connects Manado with Makassar, Sulawesi Island, to be upgraded and repaired. Portions under construction include South Minahasa, Bolaang North, Mongondow, and North Gorontalo as of 2012.

== See also ==
- Trans-Sumatran Highway
- Trans-Java toll road
