= Serdang Bedagai Regency =

Regency in North Sumatra, Indonesia

Coordinates: 3.3667°N 99.0333°E

Serdang Bedagai Regency Kabupaten Serdang Bedagai
- Regency

Other transcription(s)
  - Jawi: سردڠ بيداڬاي
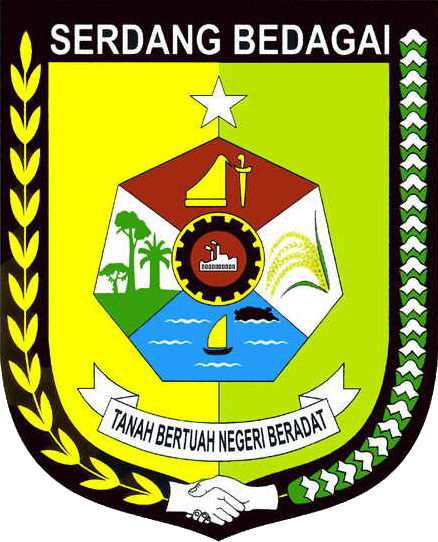
- Coat of arms
- Motto: Tanah Bertuah Negeri Beradat (The Lucky Land of the Indigenous Land)
- Country: Indonesia
- Province: North Sumatra
- Regency seat: Sei Rampah

Government
  - Regent: Darma Wijaya
  - Vice Regent: Adlin Umar Yusri Tambunan
  - Chairman of Council of Representatives: Riski Ramadhan Hasibuan (Gerindra) (Acting)
  - Vice Chairman of Council of Representatives: Siswanto (Nasdem) (Acting)

Area
  - Total: 1,900.22 km^{2} (733.68 sq mi)

Population (mid 2025 estimate)
  - Total: 700,077
  - Density: 368.419/km^{2} (954.201/sq mi)
- Time zone: UTC+7 (WIB)
- Website: www.serdangbedagaikab.go.id

Serdang Bedagai Regency is a regency on the east coast of North Sumatra Province of Indonesia, facing Malaysia, with 95 km of coastline and covering an area of 1,900.22 square kilometres, divided into seventeen districts (kecamatan), in turn subdivided into 243 villages. Its administrative centre is the town of Sei Rampah. The regency surrounds the independent city of Tebing Tinggi, and also contains a district (kecamatan) by the same name (Tebing Tinggi District surrounds the city on its west side, while Tebing Syahbandar District surrounds the city on its east side). The name "Serdang Bedagai" was derived from the two Sultanates which formerly existed in the Region; they were Serdang Sultanate and Padang Bedagai Sultanate. The population was 592,922 at the 2010 Census, while the 2020 Census produced a total of 657,490; the official estimate as of mid 2025 was 700,077 (comprising 352,386 males and 347,691 females).

== Location ==
Serdang Bedagai Regency extends between 3° 01’ 2.5’’ North latitude and 3° 46’ 33’’ North latitude, and between 98° 44’ 22” east longitude and 99° 19’ 01’’ east longitude. To the north are the Malacca Straits, to the west is Deli Serdang Regency (surrounding Medan), to the south and southeast is Simalungun Regency, and to the east are the Buaya River and Ular River bordering Batubara Regency, which was formed in 2006 from the western part of the Asahan Regency.

== Administration ==
The Serdang Bedagai Regency is divided administratively into seventeen districts (kecamatan), tabulated below with their areas and their populations at the 2010 Census and the 2020 Census, together with the official estimates as of mid 2025. The table also includes the locations of the district administrative centres, the numbers of administrative villages in each district (totaling 237 rural desa and 6 urban kelurahan), and its post code.

Kode Wilayah	Name of District (kecamatan)	Area in km^{2}	Pop'n Census 2010	Pop'n Census 2020	Pop'n Estimate mid 2025	Admin centre	No. of villages	Post code
12.18.10	Kotarih	78.02	7,975	9,169	9,942	Kotarih	11	20982
12.18.11	Silinda	56.74	8,332	9,514	10,281	Silinda	9	20983
12.18.17	Bintang Bayu	95.59	10,581	12,511	13,750	Bitang Bayu	19	20984
12.18.09	Dolok Masihul	237.42	48,241	52,705	55,752	Pekan Dolok Masihul	28 ^{(a)}	20991
12.18.12	Serbajabi	50.69	19,560	21,759	23,219	Serbajabi	10	20995
12.18.08	Sipispis	145.26	31,617	33,826	35,521	Sipispis	20	20992
12.18.07	Dolok Merawan	120.60	17,029	17,976	18,702	Dolok Merawan	17	20993
12.18.13	Tebing Tinggi	182.29	40,253	41,162	42,170	Tebing Tinggi	14	20999
12.18.16	Tebing Syahbandar	120.30	32,191	33,585	34,743	Paya Pasir	10	20998
12.18.06	Bandar Khalipah	116.00	24,774	25,857	26,754	Bandar Khakipah	5	20994
12.18.05	Tanjung Beringin	74.17	36,864	42,142	45,567	Tanjung Beringin	8	20996
12.18.04	Sei Rampah	198.90	63,379	71,366	76,603	Sei Rampah	17	20995
12.18.15	Sei Bamban	72.26	42,791	46,043	48,347	Sei Bamban	10	20995
12.18.03	Teluk Mengkudu (Mengkudu Bay)	66.95	41,118	48,334	52,972	Sialang Buah	12	20997
12.18.02	Perbaungan	111.62	99,936	112,153	120,189	Simpang III Pekan	28 ^{(b)}	20985
12.18.14	Pegajahan	93.12	26,859	30,206	32,403	Pegajahan	13 ^{(c)}	20986
12.18.01	Pantai Cermin	80.30	42,883	49,182	53,262	Pantai Cermin	12	20987
	Totals	1,900.22	594,383	657,490	700,077		243	

Notes: (a) including one kelurahan (Pekan Dolok Masihul). (b) comprising four kelurahan (Batang Terap, Melati I, Simpang Tiga Pekan and Tualang) and 24 desa. (c) including one kelurahan (Melati Kebun).
