= 2026 North Musi Rawas collision =

Public transit accident in Indonesia

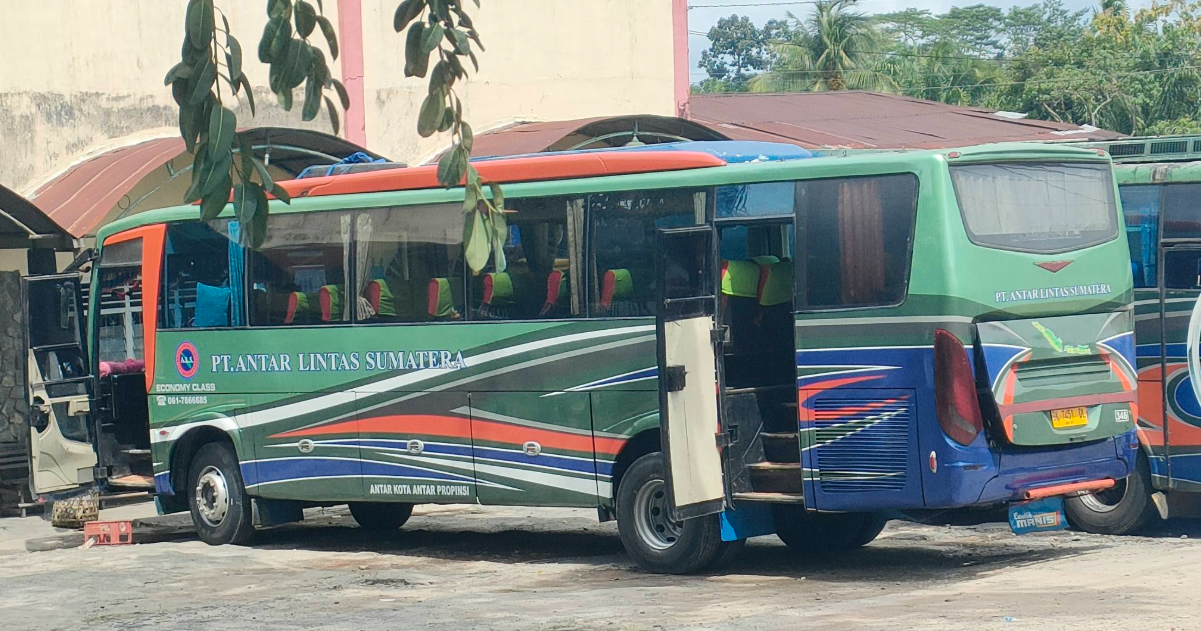
- ALS bus number 346, the bus involved in the incident

Details
- Date: 6 May 2026; 12:39 WIB
- Location: Trans-Sumatra Highway, Karang Jaya, North Musi Rawas Regency, South Sumatra
- Country: Indonesia
- Operator: ALS
- Owner: PT Antar Lintas Sumatra
- Service: Intercity Interprovince (AKAP)
- Incident type: Collision
- Cause: Under investigation

Statistics
- Bus: 1
- Vehicles: 2
- Passengers: at least 19
- Crew: 2
- Deaths: 19
- Damage: Two vehicles burned

On 6 May 2026, an Antar Lintas Sumatera bus and an oil tanker truck collided on the Trans-Sumatra Highway in Karang Jaya, North Musi Rawas Regency, South Sumatra. The accident resulted in the deaths of 19 people.

== Chronology ==
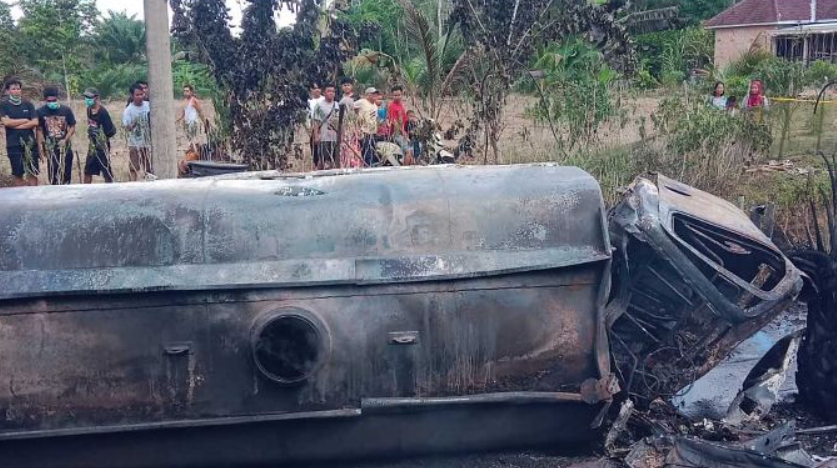
Oil tanker truck involved in the collision

On 6 May 2026, an Antar Lintas Sumatera (ALS) bus was traveling from Lubuklinggau toward Pekanbaru and Medan.

While passing through Karang Jaya District, sparks reportedly emerged from the bus. The driver attempted to steer the vehicle toward the right side of the road to minimize risk. At 12:39 WIB, an oil tanker truck traveling at high speed from the opposite direction appeared simultaneously, resulting in an unavoidable collision.

== Casualties ==
A total of 16 people were killed in the incident, including 14 bus passengers and 2 crew members of the tanker truck.

== Response and evacuation ==
Following the incident, personnel from the Regional Disaster Management Agency (BPBD) and the Indonesian National Police were deployed to the scene.

== Investigation ==
The exact cause of the accident remains under investigation by the National Transportation Safety Committee, police, and relevant authorities.
