= Tebing Tinggi =

City in North Sumatra, Indonesia

- City
- City of Tebing Tinggi; Kota Tebing Tinggi

Other transcription(s)
  - Jawi: تبيڠ تيڠڬي
  - Batak: ᯖᯩᯅᯪᯰ ᯖᯪᯝ᯲ᯎᯪ
  - Chinese: 直名丁宜
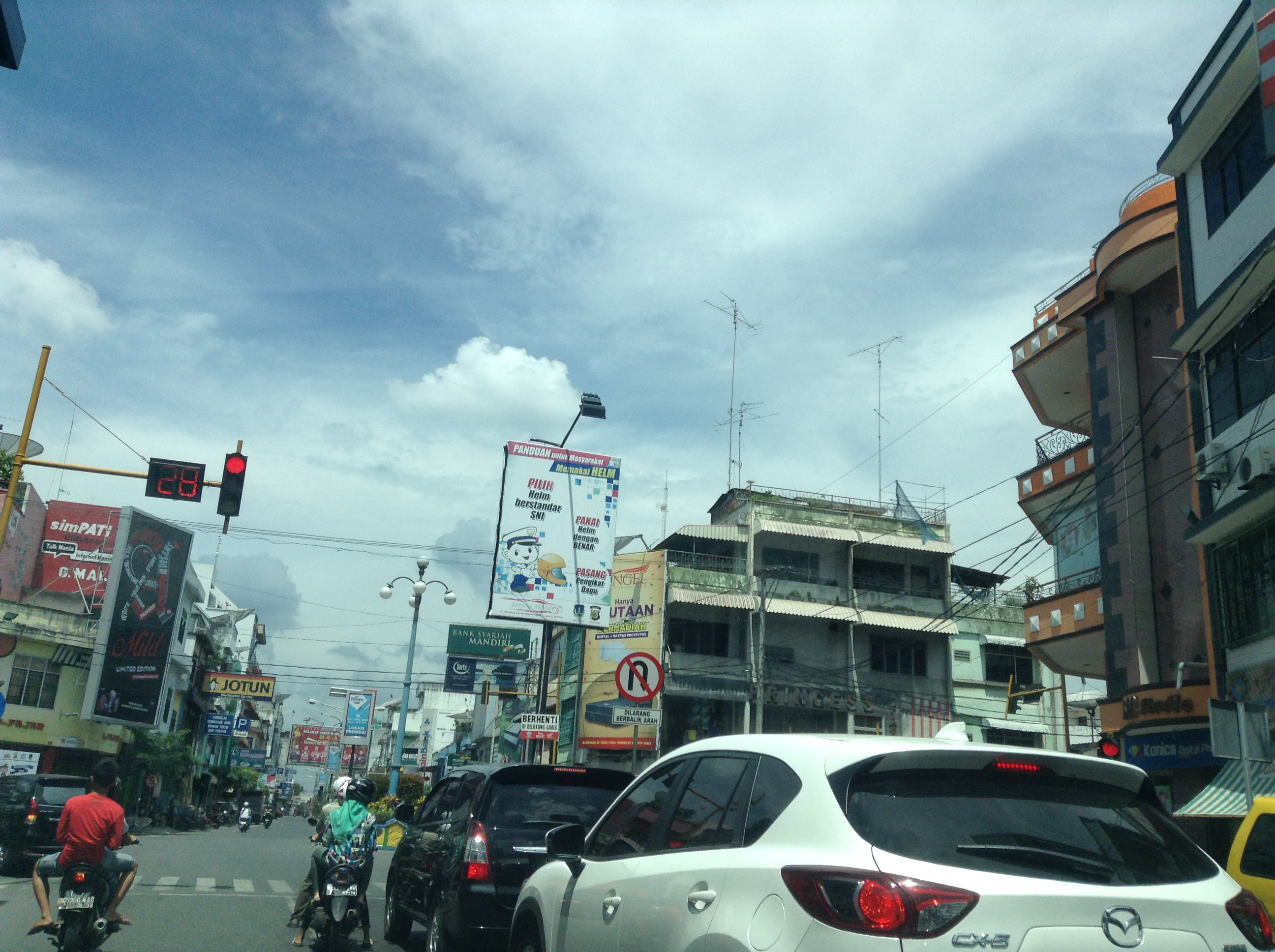
- Street view of Tebing Tinggi

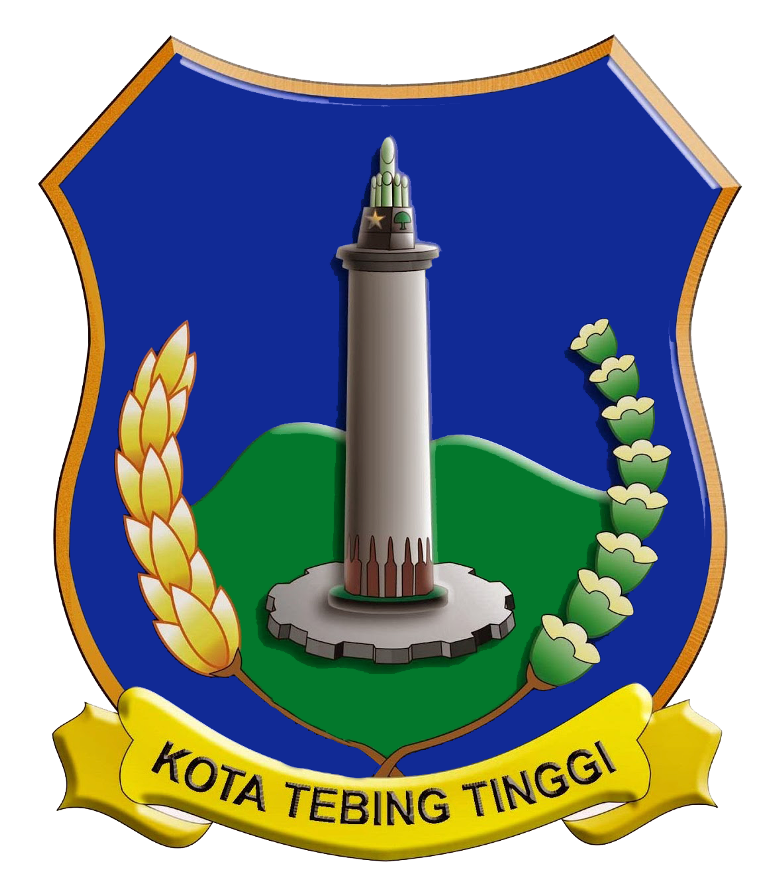
- Coat of arms

- Location within North Sumatra

- Location in Sumatra and Indonesia Tebing Tinggi (Indonesia)
- Coordinates: 3°19′10″N 99°9′8″E
- Country: Indonesia
- Province: North Sumatra

Government
  - Mayor: Iman Irdian Saragih
  - Vice Mayor: Chairil Mukmin Tambunan
  - Chairman of City's Council of Representatives: Basyaruddin Nasution (Golkar)
  - Vice Chairmen of City's Council of Representatives: Muhammad Azwar (Nasdem) and Iman Irdian Saragih (PDI-P)

Area
  - Total: 38.44 km^{2} (14.84 sq mi)

Population (mid 2025 estimate)
  - Total: 184,893
  - Density: 4,810/km^{2} (12,460/sq mi)
- Time zone: UTC+7 (Indonesia Western Time)
- Area code: (+62) 621
- Website: www.tebingtinggikota.go.id

Tebing Tinggi Deli, officially Tebing Tinggi City, or more commonly simply Tebing Tinggi (Jawi: تبيڠ تيڠڬي / Batak: ᯖᯩᯅᯪᯰ ᯖᯪᯝ᯲ᯎᯪ) is a city near the eastern coast of North Sumatra Province of Indonesia. It has an area of 38.44 km^{2} and a population at the 2010 Census of 145,180, which grew to 172,838 at the 2020 Census; the official estimate as of mid 2025 was 184,893 (comprising 92,117 males and 92,776 females). Tebing Tinggi is an enclave within Serdang Bedagai Regency (which surrounds it on all sides, and also contains a kecamatan (district) bordering the city that is also named Tebing Tinggi).

== Geography ==
According to the Agency for Information and Communication Data North Sumatra, Tebing Tinggi is one of the 8 independent cities (formerly called municipalities) in North Sumatra, located around 80 km from Medan (the capital of North Sumatra Province) and situated at a crossroads of the Trans-Sumatran Highway (connecting the East Coast Highway to Tanjungbalai and Rantau Prapat) and the Central Sumatra Highway (to Pematangsiantar, Parapat, and Balige).

== Administrative districts ==
The city is divided administratively into five districts, tabulated below with their areas and their populations at the 2010 Census and the 2020 Census, together with the official estimates as of mid 2025. The table also includes the number of administrative villages in each district (all classed as urban kelurahan), and its post code.

| Kode Wilayah | Name of District (kecamatan) | Area in km^{2} | Pop'n Census 2010 | Pop'n Census 2020 | Pop'n Estimate mid 2025 | No. of kelurahan | Post codes |
|---|---|---|---|---|---|---|---|
| 12.76.01 | Padang Hulu (Upstream Padang) | 8.51 | 26,714 | 32,530 | 34,750 | 7 | 20622 - 20625 |
| 12.76.05 | Tebing Tinggi Kota (Tebing Tinggi Town) | 3.47 | 24,040 | 24,192 | 25,208 | 7 | 20613, 20615, 20626 - 20628, 20632 & 20633 |
| 12.76.02 | Rambutan | 5.94 | 31,371 | 38,242 | 41,768 | 7 | 20611, 20614 and 20616 |
| 12.76.04 | Bajenis | 9.08 | 33,072 | 38,933 | 40,517 | 7 | 20611 - 20613 and 20621 |
| 12.76.03 | Padang Hilir (Downstream Padang) | 11.44 | 30,051 | 38,941 | 42,650 | 7 | 20631 - 20636 |
| | Totals | 38.44 | 145,180 | 172,838 | 184,893 | 35 | |

== Demographics ==
The residents of Tebing Tinggi are Malays (70%), Batak (11%), and Chinese (8%). Javanese, Mandailing, Indian, and other ethnicities are recognized ethnic minorities. The city's religion is predominantly Islam, followed by Christianity, Buddhism, and other religions.

== Climate ==
Tebing Tinggi has a tropical rainforest climate (Af) with heavy rainfall year-round.

Climate data for Tebing Tinggi
| Month | Jan | Feb | Mar | Apr | May | Jun | Jul | Aug | Sep | Oct | Nov | Dec | Year |
|---|---|---|---|---|---|---|---|---|---|---|---|---|---|
| Mean daily maximum °C (°F) | 30.9 (87.6) | 31.5 (88.7) | 31.9 (89.4) | 32.1 (89.8) | 32.3 (90.1) | 32.3 (90.1) | 32.1 (89.8) | 31.8 (89.2) | 31.3 (88.3) | 30.9 (87.6) | 30.6 (87.1) | 30.6 (87.1) | 31.5 (88.7) |
| Daily mean °C (°F) | 26.1 (79.0) | 26.5 (79.7) | 26.8 (80.2) | 27.2 (81.0) | 27.4 (81.3) | 27.2 (81.0) | 27.0 (80.6) | 26.8 (80.2) | 26.7 (80.1) | 26.5 (79.7) | 26.3 (79.3) | 26.2 (79.2) | 26.7 (80.1) |
| Mean daily minimum °C (°F) | 21.4 (70.5) | 21.5 (70.7) | 21.8 (71.2) | 22.3 (72.1) | 22.6 (72.7) | 22.2 (72.0) | 21.9 (71.4) | 21.9 (71.4) | 22.2 (72.0) | 22.2 (72.0) | 22.0 (71.6) | 21.8 (71.2) | 22.0 (71.6) |
| Average rainfall mm (inches) | 137 (5.4) | 109 (4.3) | 113 (4.4) | 163 (6.4) | 187 (7.4) | 166 (6.5) | 159 (6.3) | 217 (8.5) | 276 (10.9) | 307 (12.1) | 249 (9.8) | 215 (8.5) | 2,298 (90.5) |
Source: Climate-Data.org
