= Batubara Regency =

Regency in North Sumatra, Indonesia

Coordinates: 3°N 99.1667°E

Batubara Regency Kabupaten Batubara
- Regency

Other transcription(s)
  - Jawi: باتوبارا
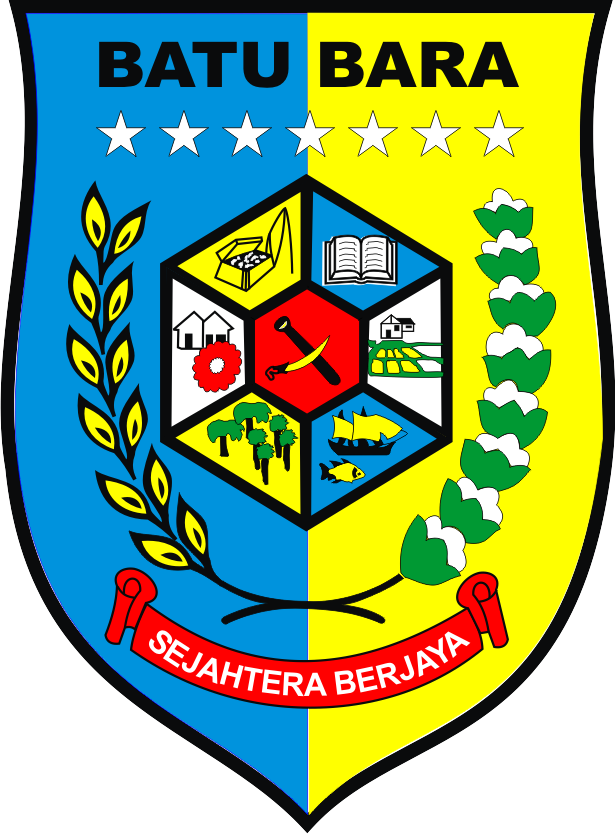
- Coat of arms
- Motto: Sejahtera Berjaya (Prosperous and Successful)
- Country: Indonesia
- Province: North Sumatra
- Regency seat: Lima Puluh

Government
  - Regent: Baharuddin Siagian
  - Vice Regent: Syafrizal
  - Chairman of Council of Representatives: Syafi'i (PDI-P)
  - Vice Chairmen of Council of Representatives: Ismar Komri (Golkar) and Safrizal (Gerindra)

Area
  - Total: 887.89 km^{2} (342.82 sq mi)

Population (mid 2025 estimate)
  - Total: 479,667
  - Density: 540.23/km^{2} (1,399.2/sq mi)
- Time zone: UTC+7 (WIB)
- Website: www.batubarakab.go.id

Batubara Regency is a regency on North Sumatra's eastern shoreline, with the town of Limapuluh as the seat of its administration. It was carved out from the seven most westerly coastal districts of Asahan Regency with effect from 15 June 2007. The new regency covers an area of 887.89 km^{2}, and had a population of 375,885 at the 2010 Census and 410,678 at the 2020 Census, of whom 206,551 were male and 204,127 were female; the official estimate as of mid 2025 was 479,667 (comprising 242,302 males and 237,365 females). It is quite densely populated compared to countries like China or Japan.

== Administrative districts ==
From 2007 until 2017 the regency was divided administratively into seven districts (kecamatan), but at the end of 2017 five additional districts were created by the division of four of the existing districts. The districts are tabulated below from east to west with their areas and their populations at the 2010 Census and the 2020 Census, together with the official estimates as of mid 2025. The table also includes the locations of the district administrative centres, the number of administrative villages in each district (totaling 141 rural desa and 10 urban kelurahan), and its post code:

Kode Wilayah	Name of District (kecamatan)	Area in km^{2}	Pop'n Census 2010	Pop'n Census 2020	Pop'n Estimate mid 2025	Admin centre	No. of villages	Post code
12.19.07	Sei Balai	85.39	26,857	29,541	32,298	Sei Balai	14	21252
12.19.06	Tanjung Tiram ^{(a)}	13.17	62,964	35,662	42,178	Tanjung Tiram	10 ^{(b)}	21253
12.19.12	Nibung Hangus	127.95	^{(c)}	31,206	37,145	Ujung Kubu	12	21253
12.19.05	Talawi	48.09	53,585	31,912	37,870	Labuhan Ruku	10 ^{(d)}	21254
12.19.11	Datuk Tanah Datar	49.24	^{(e)}	26,903	31,388	Karang Baru	10	21254
12.19.04	Lima Puluh	102.80	85,164	35,623	41,230	Lima Puluh Kota	12 ^{(f)}	21255
12.19.09	Lima Puluh Pesisir (Coastal Lima Puluh)	80.85	^{(g)}	34,921	42,263	Perupuk	13	21255
12.19.10	Datuk Lima Puluh	59.59	^{(g)}	24,432	29,235	Simpang Dolok	10	21255
12.19.03	Air Putih	81.27	46,749	51,959	60,300	Indrapura	19 ^{(h)}	21256
12.19.02	Sei Suka	73.49	52,599	33,648	38,948	Sei Suka/Deras	10 ^{(i)}	21257
12.19.08	Laut Tador	82.71	^{(j)}	21,747	24,394	Perkebunan Tanjung Kasau	10	21257
12.19.01	Medang Deras	83.33	47,967	53,124	62,417	Pangkalan Dodek	21 ^{(k)}	21258
	Totals	887.89	375,885	410,678	479,667	Lima Puluh	151	

Note: (a) includes the small offshore islands of Pandang and Salahnama. (b) including two kelurahan - Bagan Arya and Tanjung Tiram Kota.
(c) the 2010 population of the new Nibung Hangus District is included with the figure for Tanjung Tiram District, from which it was cut out. (d) including one kelurahan - Labuhan Ruku.
(e) the 2010 population of the new Datuk Tanah Datar District is included with the figure for Talawi District, from which it was cut out. (f) including one kelurahan - Lima Puluh Kota.
(g) the 2010 population of the new Lima Puluh Pesisir and Datuk Lima Puluh Districts are included with the figure for Lima Puluh District, from which they were cut out.
(h) including two kelurahan - Indrapura and Indrasakti. (i) including one kelurahan - Perkebunan Sipare-pare.
(j) the 2010 population of the new Laut Tador District is included with the figure for Sei Suka District, from which it was cut out.
(k) including 3 kelurahan - Pagurawan, Pangkalan Dodek and Pangkalan Dodek Baru.

Geographically the regency falls into two sectors - an eastern sector comprising the first eight districts (covering 567.09 km^{2} with 293,608 inhabitants in mid 2025), and a western sector comprising the last four districts (covering 320.8 km^{2} with 186,059 inhabitants in mid 2025).

== Transport ==
On 27 January 2015 groundbreaking began for the new Kuala Tanjung Port (in Sei Suka District), and the port was inaugurated in 2018. The port can accommodate 60 million TEUs (twenty-foot equivalent units) per year as the biggest port in West Indonesia, bigger than Tanjung Priok Port, in Jakarta (which has only 15 million TEUs per year).
