= Percut Sei Tuan =

District in Indonesia

- District
- Interactive map of Percut Sei Tuan
- Country: Indonesia
- Province: North Sumatra
- Regency: Deli Serdang

Area
  - Total: 190.29 km^{2} (73.47 sq mi)

Population (mid 2025 estimate)
  - Total: 424,156
  - Density: 2,229.0/km^{2} (5,773.1/sq mi)
- Time zone: UTC+7 (Indonesia Western Time)

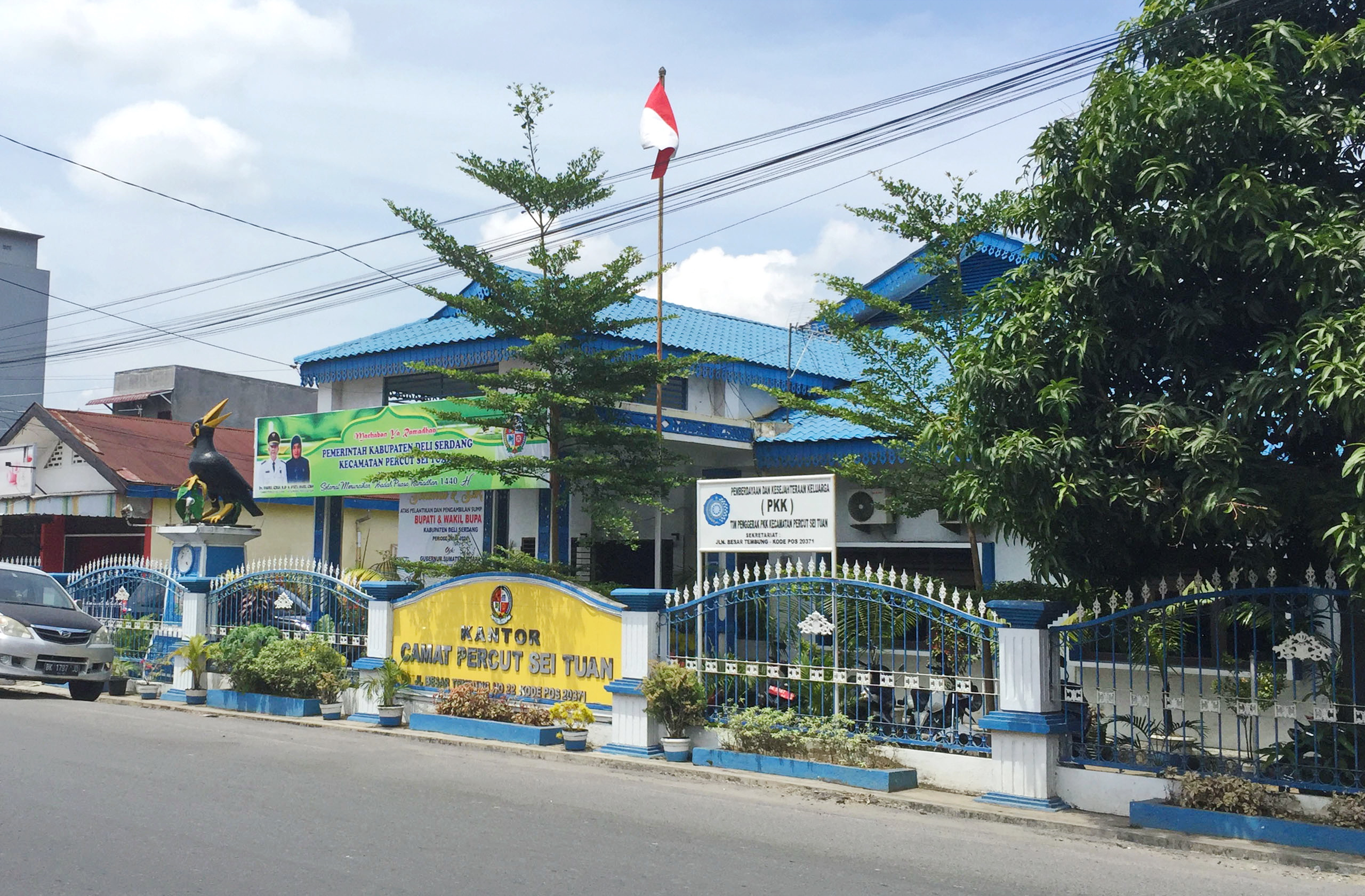
Office of Percut Sei Tuan, 2019

Percut Sei Tuan is an administrative district (kecamatan) of Deli Serdang Regency in the province of North Sumatra, Indonesia. The district covers an area of 190.29 km^{2} (73.47 sq mi) which lies immediately to the east of the city of Medan. At the 2010 Census it had 384,672 inhabitants and at the 2020 Census 402,468 inhabitants, making it one of the most populated districts in Indonesia; the official estimate as at mid 2024 was 424,156 - comprising 213,404 males and 210,752 females.

== Administration ==
The district is composed of twenty 'villages' (many of which are suburban to Medan), all sharing the postcode of 20371. These are set out below with their areas and their populations at the 2010 Census and 2020 Census, together with the official estimates as at mid 2024. For ease of reference these are grouped below into four geographical sectors, which have no administrative significance. Two of these villages are classed as urban villages (kelurahan) - Kenangan and Kenangan Baru; the other eighteen are nominally classed as rural villages (desa). The administrative centre of the Percut Sei Tuan district is located in the town of Tembung in the south of the district.

Kode Wilayah	Name of Village	Area in km^{2}	Pop'n Census 2010	Pop'n Census 2020	Pop'n Estimate mid 2024
12.07.26.2008	Amplas	14.91	8,475	11,125	11,675
12.07.26.2006	Tembung	5.87	50,932	49,076	48,193
12.07.26.2002	Sumber Rejo Timur (East Sumber Rejo)	8.24	24,937	28,328	31,095
Sub-totals	Southern (Tembung) sector	29.02	84,344	89,529	90,963
12.07.26.2018	Sei Rotan	5.41	25,474	30,624	32,360
12.07.26.2011	Bandar Klippa	5.70	34,834	35,665	39,095
12.07.26.2012	Bandar Khalipah Kebon	4.22	38,381	41,530	42,513
12.07.26.2015	Medan Estate ^{(a)}	7.45	15,440	12,123	11,341
12.07.26.2005	Laut Dendang	3.16	15,054	15,048	16,450
12.07.26.2010	Sampali ^{(b)}	22.19	27,838	25,061	27,347
12.07.26.2017	Bandar Setia	6.85	20,575	25,474	26,985
12.07.26.2003	Kolam	6.54	14,561	17,679	19,966
Sub-totals	Central sector	61.52	192,157	203,204	216,057
12.07.26.2009	Saentis	15.84	16,219	17,947	20,644
12.07.26.2007	Cinta Rakyat	1.92	12,844	14,342	16,141
12.07.26.2016	Cinta Damai	10.99	4,739	5,008	5,594
12.07.26.2001	Pematang Lalang	12.53	1,456	1,497	1,568
12.07.26.2004	Percut ^{(c)}	15.39	13,440	14,640	16,442
12.07.26.2014	Tanjung Rejo	35.62	9,338	10,273	11,681
12.07.26.2013	Tanjung Selamat	4.80	5,259	5,470	5,957
Sub-totals	Northern (Percut) sector ^{(d)}	97.09	63,295	69,177	78,027
12.07.26.1019	Kenangan	0.73	22,138	20,372	19,658
12.07.26.1020	Kenangan Baru	1.92	22,738	21,186	19,451
Sub-totals	Urban (Kenangan) sector ^{(e)}	2.65	44,876	41,558	39,109
12.07.26	Totals for District	190.29	384,672	402,468	424,156

Notes: (a) Medan Estate desa should not be confused with any of the districts (kecamatan) which are part of Medan City.
(b) the western part of Sampali desa forms a salient projecting into Medan city.
(c) The population of Percut town in 2001 was 17,863; in mid 2024 it was estimated to have 16,442 inhabitants.
(d) these seven desa form the northern 51% of the land area of the district, including the whole of the district's sea coast.
(e) the two kelurahan of Kenangan and Kenangan Baru form a salient projecting into Medan city.
