= Sei Mangkei Special Economic Zone =

Sei Mangkei Special Economic Zone Kawasan Ekonomi Khusus Sei Mangkei
- Special economic zone
- Location in Indonesia Sei Mangkei Special Economic Zone (Indonesia)
- Coordinates: 3.132156°N 99.340551°E
- Country: Indonesia
- Region: Sumatra
- Province: North Sumatra
- Regency: Simalungun Regency
- Founded: 2006
- Time zone: UTC+7 (WIB)
- Website: http://kek.go.id/kawasan/Sei-Mangkei

Sei Mangkei Special Economic Zone (Indonesian: Kawasan Ekonomi Khusus Sei Mangkei) or abbreviated as Sei Mangkei KEK, is a Special Economic Zone (SEZ) located in Bosar Maligas district, Simalungun Regency, North Sumatra, Indonesia. This SEZ has been established through Government Regulation No. 29 of 2012 on 27 February 2012. The development of SEZ Sei Mangkei is being focused mainly on Palm Oil and Rubber Processing Industry. SEZ Sei Mangkei was inaugurated by President Joko Widodo on January 27, 2015.

Sei Mangkei Special Economic Zone has an area of 2002.77 hectares, which is being built along with Port of Kuala Tanjung as part of strategy to turn North Sumatra as an international hub. SEZ Sei Mangkei consists of three zones, namely industrial zone, logistics zone and export processing zone. This KEK is adjacent to the village of Keramat Kubah in the north; with PTPN IV Kebun Mayan in the south; with PTPN IV Kebun Gunung Bayu in the east; and with the River Bah Bolon in the west.

Until the end of 2017, SEZ Sei Mangkei absorbed Rp 10.5 trillion of investment, which includes an Oleo-chemical plant of Unilever Indonesia.

== Access ==
Sei Mangkei special economic zone is connected with Port of Kuala Tanjung by a 30 kilometers long railway track.
