= Perbaungan =

Town and district in Serdang Bedagai Regency, Indonesia

Perbaungan is a town and administrative district (kecamatan) in Serdang Bedagai Regency, part of North Sumatra province, Indonesia. Perbaungan serves as the gateway town when entering Serdang Bedagai Regency from the direction of Medan. It has an area of 111.62 km^{2}, and had a population of 121,018 in mid 2025. Perbaungan was the capital of the former Sultanate of Serdang in the past where the center of government of the Sultanate, namely Darul Arif Palace, was located in Galuh town (Kota Galuh).

== Administration ==
The district is sub-divided into 28 villages, of which 4 are classed as urban kelurahan (indicated by asterisks after their name in the table below) and 24 as rural desa. These are tabulated below with their areas and their populations as officially estimated in mid 2025.

Kode Wilayah	Name	Area in km^{2}	Pop'n Estimate mid 2025
12.18.02.2001	Adolina	16.74	1,048
12.18.02.2020	Melati Dua	11.80	18,471
12.18.02.2035	Tanjung Buluh	7.39	568
12.18.02.2031	Sei Buluh	1.23	3,887
12.18.02.2033	Sei Sijenggi	2.71	5,686
12.18/02.2007	Deli Muda Hulu	3.77	407
12.18.02.1038	Melati Satu *	1.17	2,310
12.18.02.2006	Citaman Jernih	1.62	8,038
12.18.02.1040	Batang Terap *	1.97	4,026
12.18.02.1039	Simpang Tiga Pekan *	1.78	12,178
12.18.02.2013	Kota Galuh	3.00	4,757
12.18.02.1041	Tualang *	5.04	10,061
12.18.02.2003	Bengkel	1.37	4,858
12.18.02.2008	Deli Muda Hilir	4.63	1,080

Kode Wilayah	Name	Area in km^{2}	Pop'n Estimate mid 2025
12.18.02.2034	Tanah Merah	3.39	3,610
12.18.02.2016	Lubuk Bayas	4.81	3,067
12.18.02.2032	Sei Naga Lawan	5.58	3,313
12.18/02.2019	Lubuk Rotan	3.64	2,655
12.18.02.2012	Kesatuan	3.32	2,877
12.18/02.2015	Lidah Tanah	4.60	4,988
12.18.02.2025	Pematang Tatal	1.89	2,372
12.18.02.2018	Lubuk Dendang	1.76	1,722
12.18.02.2028	Suka Beras	3.26	1,043
12.18.02.2005	Cinta Air	3.52	1,628
12.18.02.2024	Pematang Sijonam	4.71	4,862
12.18.02.2017	Lubuk Cemara	2.50	1,584
12.18.02.2009	Jambur Pulau	2.47	5,214
12.18.02.2029	Suka Jadi	1.95	4,708
12.18.02	Totals	111.62	121,018
