= Trans-Sumatra Highway =

Highway in Indonesia

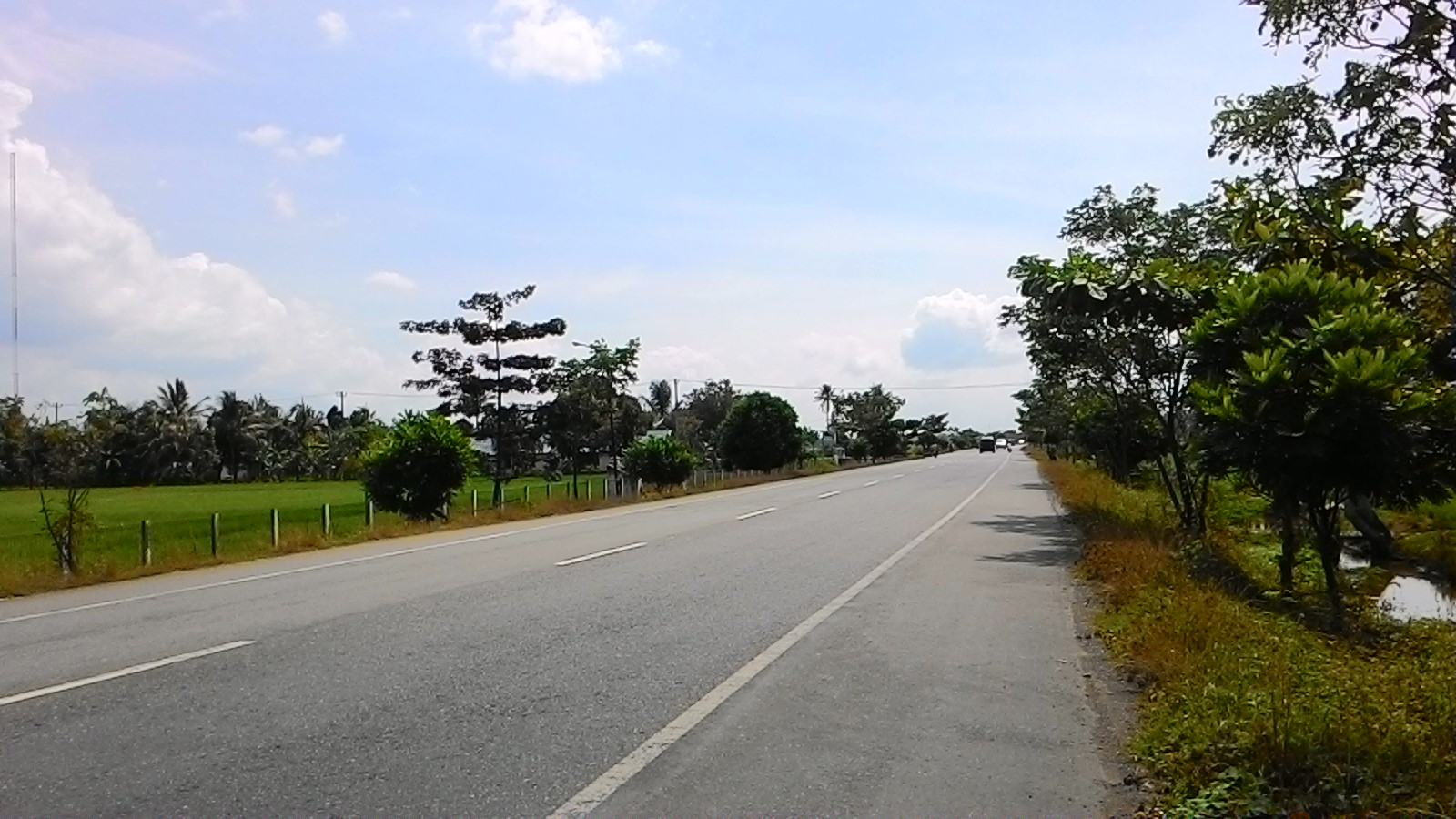
Trans-Sumatra Highway Eastern Route in Aceh Besar, Aceh, Indonesia

The Trans-Sumatra Highway (Indonesian: Jalan Raya Trans-Sumatra) is a primary north–south road in the Indonesian island of Sumatra, 2,508.5 km in length, and connecting the north of the island at Banda Aceh to Bandar Lampung in the south, running through many major cities, traversing Medan, Pekanbaru, Jambi, and Palembang along the way (the Sumatra East Road). Upgrade work began in March 2013 transforming it into a full-fledged highway, including land acquisition.

The road is a major artery, carrying transmigrants from Java to the less densely populated Sumatra, and carrying Sumatran visitors to Jakarta and Java. The eastern and central route of the Trans-Sumatra Highway forms the whole section of the Asian Highway 25 (AH25) and ASEAN Highway 151 (AH151), respectively.

It consists of 4 parts, namely Jalan Raya Lintas Barat (Jalinbar), Jalan Raya Lintas Tengah (Jalinteng), Jalan Raya Lintas Timur (Jalintim), and Jalan Raya Lintas Pantai Timur.

Parts of it are being set up for controlled-access highways. The Medan–Binjai Toll Road is 17 km long and set to completed in the end of 2017.

On 6 May 2026, a major accident took place along the highway between a bus and an oil tanker, resulting in 16 deaths.

== Major cities linked by the roads ==
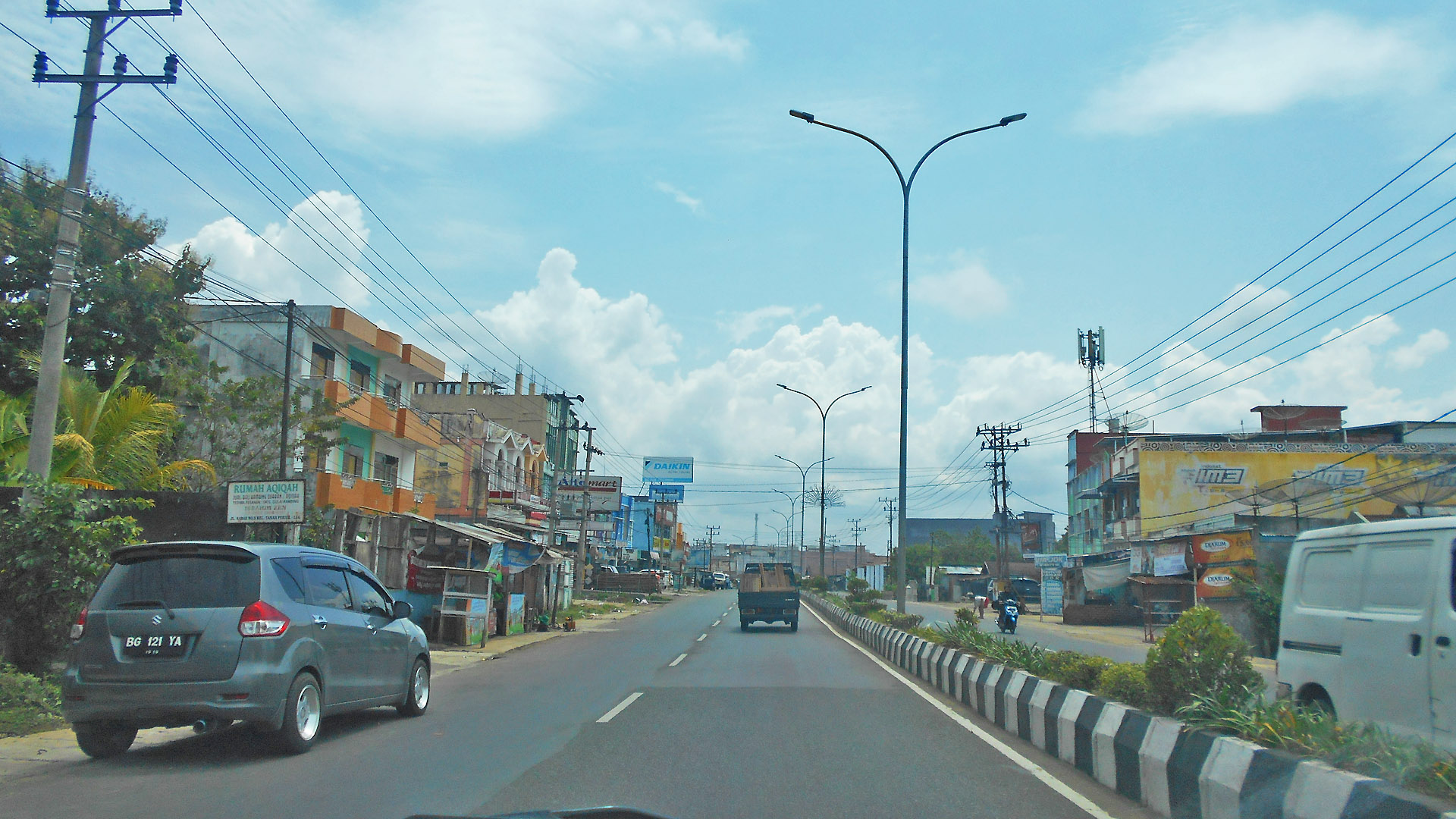
The Trans-Sumatran Highway at Lubuklinggau, South Sumatra

- Jalinbar (West): Padang Panjang, Padang, Painan, Bengkulu, and parts of Lampung. This route numbered as National 7 Sumatra.
- Jalinteng (Central): Medan, Pematang Siantar, Parapat, Tarutung, Padang Sidempuan, Bonjol, Bukittinggi, Singkarak, Bandar Jaya and Bandar Lampung. This route numbered as National 5 Sumatra.
- Jalintim (East): Banda Aceh, Lhokseumawe, Langsa, Pangkalan Brandan, Binjai, Medan, Limapuluh, Kisaran, Rantau Prapat, Pekanbaru, Pangkalan Kerinci, Jambi, Palembang, Indralaya, Banjar Agung, Bandar Jaya. This route numbered as National 1 Sumatra.

== Controlled-access highway planning ==
In 2012, the Indonesian government had planned to build the Trans-Sumatra toll road that connects Lampung to Aceh along 2,700 kilometers. The government will allocate Rp 150 trillion for the construction of the toll roads. In the early stages, the toll road parts which is ready to be built are Padang–Sicincin Toll Road (27 km) and Medan–Kualanamu–Tebing Tinggi Toll Road.

=== Progress ===
- Medan–Tebing Tinggi Toll Road is divided into 2 sections:
  - Section-1: Medan-Perbarakan-Kualanamu (17.8 km) has been kicked off in September 2014 and the land acquisition has reached 83 percent and construction finished reached 15 percent at end of 2014. It was predicted to be finished in June 2016.
  - Section-2: Perbarakan-Tebing Tinggi (43.9 km), the 40-year concession deal has been signed and the land acquisition has reached 81 percent. It was predicted to be finished in 2017.

== See also ==
- Trans-Sumatra Toll Road
- Trans-Sulawesi Highway
- Trans-Java toll road
