= Limapuluh =

Coordinates: 3°10′N 99°25′E

Limapuluh is a town in North Sumatra province of Indonesia and it is the seat (capital) of Batubara Regency.

== Climate ==
Lima Puluh has a tropical rainforest climate (Af) with heavy to very heavy rainfall year-round.

Climate data for Lima Puluh
Month	Jan	Feb	Mar	Apr	May	Jun	Jul	Aug	Sep	Oct	Nov	Dec	Year
Mean daily maximum °C (°F)	31.0 (87.8)	31.5 (88.7)	31.9 (89.4)	32.0 (89.6)	32.1 (89.8)	32.1 (89.8)	31.9 (89.4)	31.6 (88.9)	31.2 (88.2)	30.9 (87.6)	30.6 (87.1)	30.6 (87.1)	31.5 (88.6)
Daily mean °C (°F)	26.2 (79.2)	26.5 (79.7)	26.9 (80.4)	27.1 (80.8)	27.3 (81.1)	27.2 (81.0)	26.9 (80.4)	26.7 (80.1)	26.7 (80.1)	26.6 (79.9)	26.3 (79.3)	26.2 (79.2)	26.7 (80.1)
Mean daily minimum °C (°F)	21.5 (70.7)	21.6 (70.9)	21.9 (71.4)	22.3 (72.1)	22.6 (72.7)	22.3 (72.1)	21.9 (71.4)	21.9 (71.4)	22.2 (72.0)	22.3 (72.1)	22.0 (71.6)	21.8 (71.2)	22.0 (71.6)
Average rainfall mm (inches)	138 (5.4)	102 (4.0)	113 (4.4)	150 (5.9)	180 (7.1)	157 (6.2)	161 (6.3)	217 (8.5)	256 (10.1)	307 (12.1)	240 (9.4)	206 (8.1)	2,227 (87.5)
Source: Climate-Data.org
