= Sei Rampah =

Indonesian municipality

Coordinates: 3°29′28″N 99°07′39″E

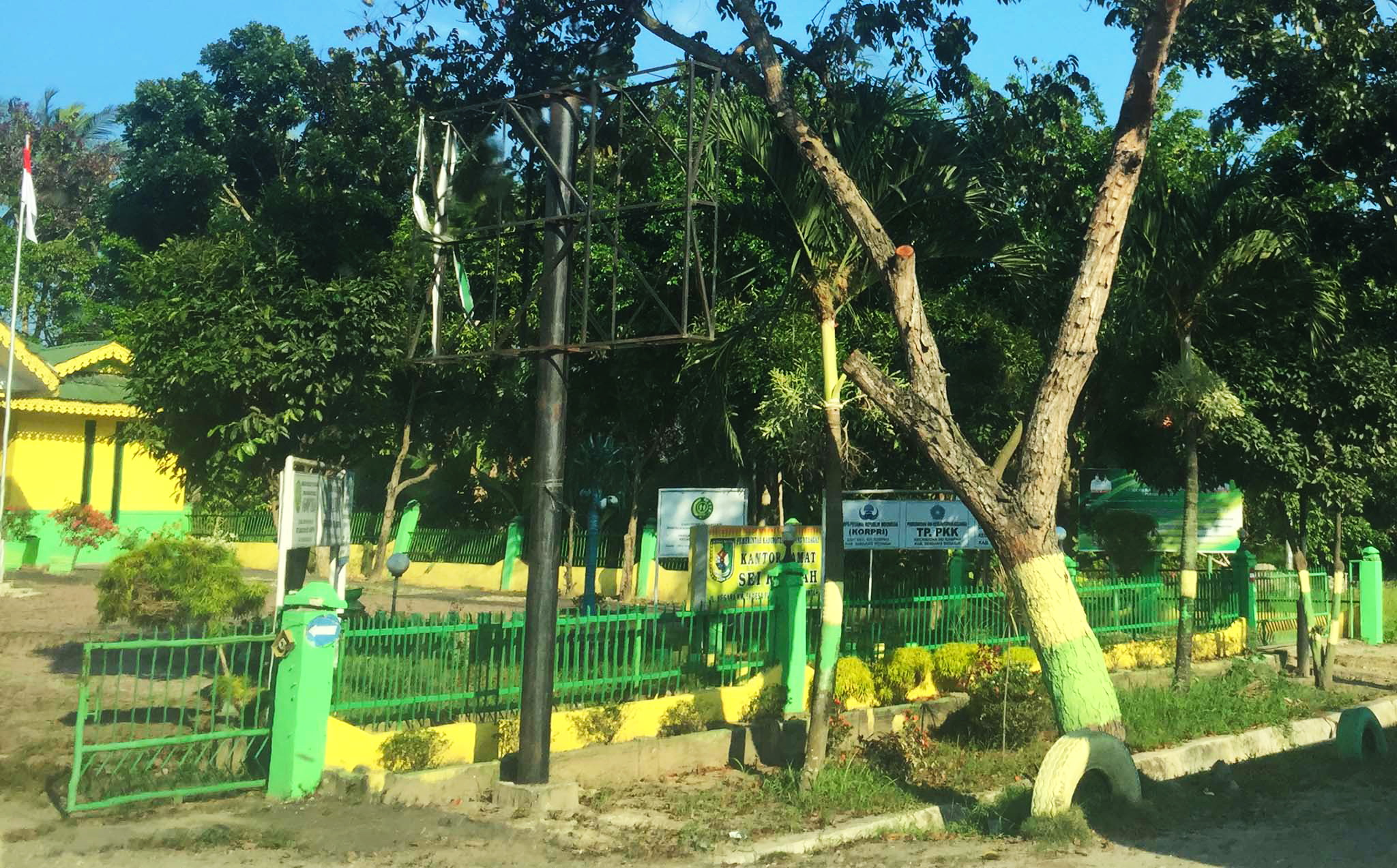
Office of Sei Rampah, Serdang Bedagai

Sei Rampah is an administrative district (kecamatan) in North Sumatra province of Indonesia. It is also that name of a town within that district which serves as the seat (capital) of Serdang Bedagai Regency.
