= Port of Kuala Tanjung =

Port in North Sumatra, Indonesia

Coordinates: 3.360935°N 99.449204°E

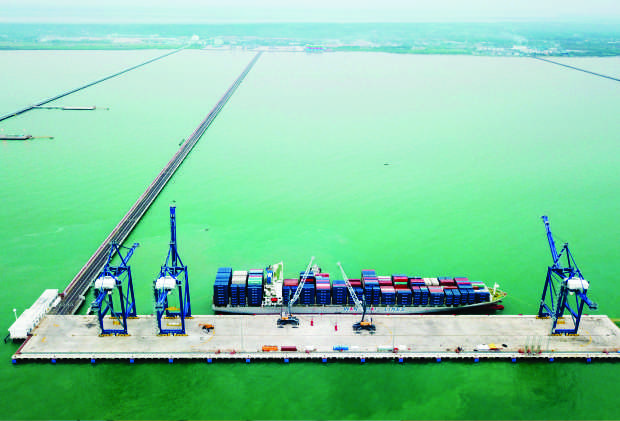
Kuala Tanjung Multipurpose Terminal

Port of Kuala Tanjung is a sea port in Batubara Regency, North Sumatra, Indonesia. Once fully functional, the port can accommodate 60 million TEUs (twenty-foot equivalent units) per year as the biggest port in West Indonesia, bigger than Port of Tanjung Priok in Jakarta. The first phase of development of Kuala Tanjung Multipurpose Terminal was inaugurated in 2018. The first ship to dock at the port was the cruise ship SuperStar Libra on 5 April 2018 from Port Klang, Malaysia. The port made its debut in the global container market, with its first shipment on 28 March, 2020.

== Development ==
Groundbreaking of the port was done on 27 January 2015. State-owned port operator Pelindo I teamed up with the Netherlands-based Port of Rotterdam and Dubai-based port operator DP World to build the integrated port, which will in total have cost about Rp 34 trillion (US$2.5 billion). Situated in a strategic location near the busy waters of the Malacca Strait, Kuala Tanjung is Indonesia's largest transit hub. Sei Mangkei Special Economic Zone was built along with the Port of Kuala Tanjung as part of the strategy to turn North Sumatra into an international hub.

The port is part of the Maritime Silk Road that runs from the Chinese coast via the Suez Canal to the Mediterranean, there to the Upper Adriatic region of Trieste with its rail connections to Central and Eastern Europe.

Pelindo I signed a partnership agreement for the development of Kuala Tanjung Port with two port operators, the Port of Rotterdam Authority of the Netherlands and the Zhejiang Provincial Seaport Investment & Operation Group Co of China to transform Kuala Tanjung into a world-class maritime hub featuring peerless integration with nearby industrial parks, thereby strengthening its position in the Malacca Strait.

The Port of Kuala Tanjung has been developed in four phases.

- First phase was the construction of a multipurpose terminal from 2015 to 2017.
- Second phase was the development of 3000 hectares of an industrial zone from 2016 to 2018.
- Third phase was the development of a container port and residential area from 2017 to 2019.
- The fourth phase was the construction of an integrated industrial zone or a port city from 2012 to 2023.

The first phase of the project was estimated to cost Rp 2.5 trillion (US$188 million). The port started partial operations by the end of 2017, and was inaugurated in August 2018.

== See also ==
- List of Indonesian ports
- Ministry of Transportation, Indonesia
- Transport in Indonesia
