= Tebing Tinggi, Serdang Bedagai =

District of Tebing Tinggi
- District
- Interactive map of District of Tebing Tinggi
- Coordinates: 3°38′54″N 99°20′40″E
- Country: Indonesia
- Province: North Sumatra
- Capital: Lalang, Tebing Tinggi City

Area
  - Total: 182.29 km^{2} (70.38 sq mi)

Population (mid 2025 estimate)
  - Total: 42,170
  - Density: 231.3/km^{2} (599/sq mi)
- Time zone: GMT +7

Tebing Tinggi District (Indonesian: Kecamatan Tebing Tinggi, "High Cliff District") is an administrative district (kecamatan) in Serdang Bedagai Regency, North Sumatra, Indonesia. It is located 52 km east of the provincial capital, Medan.

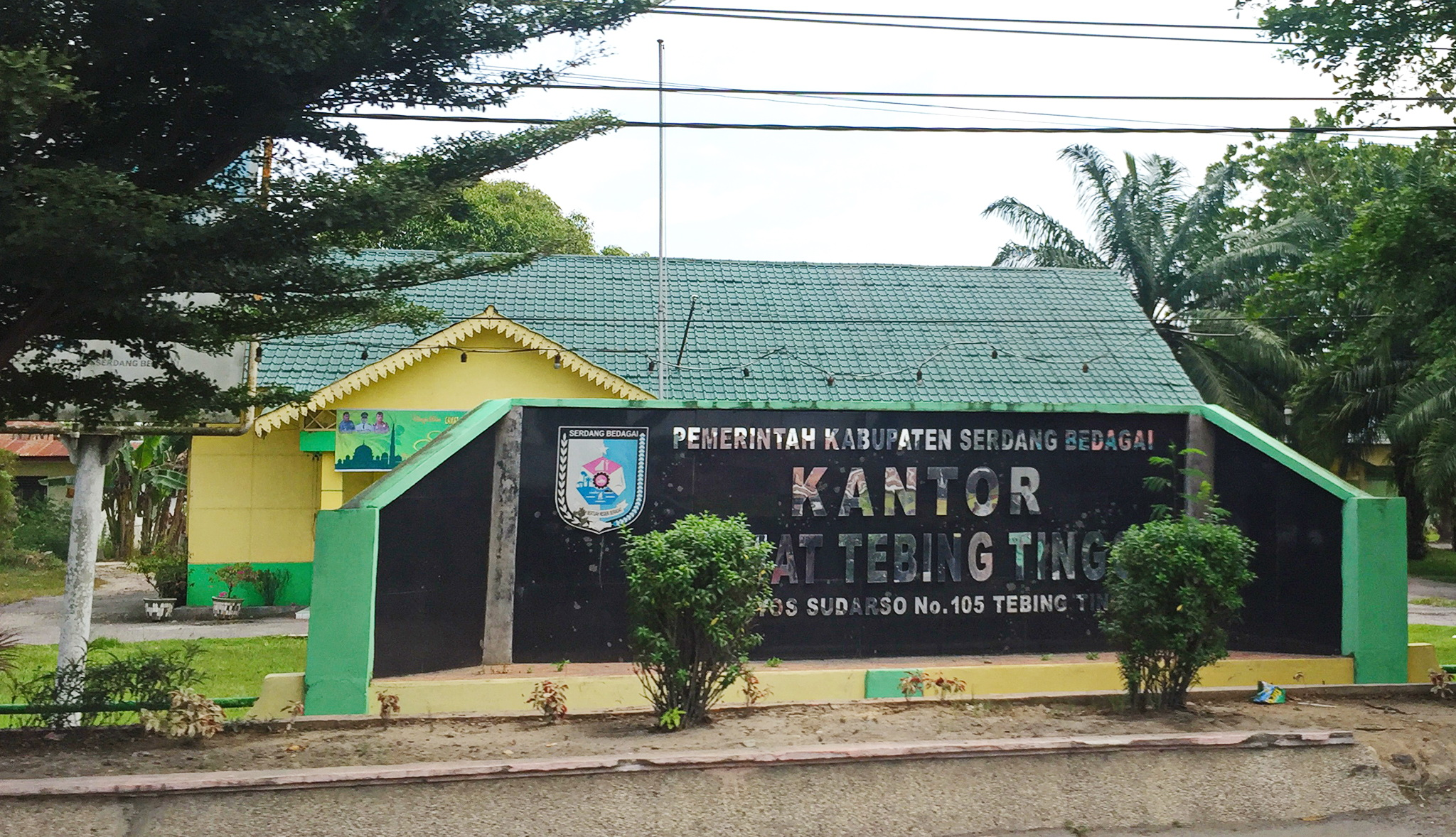
Administrative center of Tebing Tinggi District

The administrative centre of Tebing Tinggi District is not located within its borders, but is actually located in the neighbouring Tebing Tinggi City, specifically in the kelurahan of Lalang.

== Subdivisions ==
Tebing Tinggi District is subdivided into the following villages:

1. Kedai Damar
2. Naga Kesiangan
3. Tebing Tinggi
4. Kuta Baru
5. Mariah Padang
6. Pertapaan
7. Penonggol
8. Sei Sarimah
9. Sei Priok
10. Paya Bagas
11. Paya Lombang
12. Paya Mabar
13. Jambu
14. Gunung Kataran
