= Tanjung Morawa =

Town and district in Indonesia

Coordinates: 3°31′N 98°47′E

- Town and District
- Interactive map of Tanjung Morawa
- Country: Indonesia
- Province: North Sumatra
- Regency: Deli Serdang

Area
  - Total: 132.52 km^{2} (51.17 sq mi)

Population (mid 2024 estimate)
  - Total: 243,585
  - Density: 1,838.1/km^{2} (4,760.7/sq mi)
- Time zone: UTC+7 (Indonesia Western Time)

Tanjung Morawa is a large town and an administrative district (kecamatan) within Deli Serdang Regency of North Sumatra Province, Indonesia. The district has an area of 132.52 square kilometres (51.17 sq mi) and had a population of 192,759 at the 2010 Census and 223,450 at the 2020 Census; the official estimate as at mid 2024 was 243,585. The administrative centre is located at the town of Tanjung Morawa.

== Villages ==
The district is sub-divided into one urban community (kelurahan) - Tanjung Morawa Pekan - and twenty-five 'villages' (rural desa), all sharing the postcode of 20362, as set out below with their areas and their populations at the 2020 Census and according to the estimates for mid 2024.

Kode Wilayah	Name	Area in km^{2}	Pop'n Census 2020	Pop'n Estimate mid 2024
12.07.02.2001	Medan Sinembah	8.71	10,333	11,716
12;07.02.2004	Bandar Labuhan	2.43	9,275	9,614
12.07.02.2005	Bangun Rejo	7.69	14,135	15,932
12.07.02.2006	Aek Pancur	9.81	450	468
12.07.02.2008	Naga Timbul	9.10	4,581	5,311
12.07.02 2009	Lengau Serpang	4.25	5,451	6,034
12.07.02.2007	Sei Merah	10.30	1,153	1,302
12.07.02.2013	Dagang Kerawan	1.98	6,791	7,474
12.07.02.1026	Tanjung Morawa Pekan	2.20	6,905	6,884
12.07.02.2014	Tanjung Morawa A	3.90	15,373	16,737
12.07.02.2003	Limau Manis	3.95	21,103	23,477
12.07.02.2002	Ujung Serdang	4.19	4,726	5,724
12.07.02.2016	Bangun Sari	8.06	17,089	18,811
12.07.02.2023	Bangun Sari Baru	8.28	12,569	13,971

Kode Wilayah	Name	Area in km^{2}	Pop'n Census 2020	Pop'n Estimate mid 2024
12.07.02.2015	Buntu Bedimbar	3.05	16,648	17,619
12.07.02.2024	Telaga Sari	2.78	7,850	8,096
12.07.02.2017	Dagang Kelambir	1.63	3,907	4,280
12.07.02.2012	Tanjung Morawa B	5.29	15,722	16,137
12.07.02.2025	Tanjung Baru	3.25	9,409	9,862
12.07.02.2011	Punden Rejo	1.47	2,616	2,901
12.07.02.2010	Tanjung Mulia	1.69	1,868	2,207
12.07.02.2021	Perdamaian	4.52	4,868	5,075
12.07.02.2020	Wono Sari	10.07	12,666	13,503
12.07.02.2018	Dalu Sepuluh A	3.75	9,094	10,013
12.07.02.2019	Dalu Sepuluh B	5.08	8,452	9,870
12.07.02.2022	Penara Kebun	5.09	416	547
12.07.02	Totals	132.52	223,450	243,565
