= Batak Christian Protestant Church =

Evangelical Lutheran church in Indonesia

- Huria Kristen Batak Protestan ᯂ᯲ᯥᯒᯪᯀ ᯂ᯲ᯒᯪᯘ᯲ᯗᯩᯉ᯲ Bᯀᯗᯂ᯲ Pᯒᯬᯗᯩᯘ᯲ᯗᯉ᯲
- Abbreviation: HKBP
- Classification: Christianity
- Orientation: Protestant
- Scripture: Protestant Bible
- Theology: Lutheranism (Note: HKBP Confession)
- Polity: Episcopal
- First Ephorus: Ludwig Ingwer Nommensen
- Current Ephorus: Victor Tinambunan
- Associations: See below
- Region: Indonesia, United States, Japan, Europe, Singapore, and Malaysia
- Language: Indonesian, Toba Batak
- Headquarters: Hutatoruan V, Tarutung, North Sumatra, Indonesia
- Origin: 7 October 1861
- Separated from: Rhenish Missionary Society (RMG)
- Separations: Evangelical Lutheranism: GKPS, GKPA, GKPI, GKPPD, GMB, HKI, GPP; Confessional Lutheranism: GKLI
- Members: > 6,500,000 (as of 2024)
- Official website: hkbp.or.id

The Batak Christian Protestant Church (Indonesian: Huria Kristen Batak Protestan; Toba Batak: ᯂ᯲ᯥᯒᯪᯀ ᯂ᯲ᯒᯪᯘ᯲ᯗᯩᯉ᯲ Bᯀᯗᯂ᯲ Pᯒᯬᯗᯩᯘ᯲ᯗᯉ᯲), abbreviated as HKBP, is the Lutheran church among the Batak ethnic group, generally the Toba Batak people of Indonesia. This church uses an Ecumenical worship style influenced by the Dutch Reformed Church due to the influence of Dutch colonialism in Indonesia, as well as the Pietistic legacy left by the Rhenish Missionary Society when the church was founded. With a membership of more than 6,500,000 (as of 2024), the church synod is the largest among the Protestant churches in Indonesia and Southeast Asia, or the third largest religious organization in Indonesia after Nahdlatul Ulama and Muhammadiyah. Its present leader is Ephorus (bishop) Victor Tinambunan.

HKBP also has several churches abroad, such as in Europe, Singapore, Malaysia, Japan, and the United States.

HKBP is headquartered in Pearaja (North Tapanuli Regency, North Sumatra) which is about 1 km from the city center of Tarutung, the capital of the regency. Pearaja is a village located along the road to Central Tapanuli Regency and Sibolga city. The HKBP headquarters complex is located in an area of about 20 hectares (49 acres). In this complex there is also an Ephorus (bishop) as the head of the HKBP office. Although Toba Batak is the majority ethnic group, HKBP is also open to other ethnic groups.

== History ==
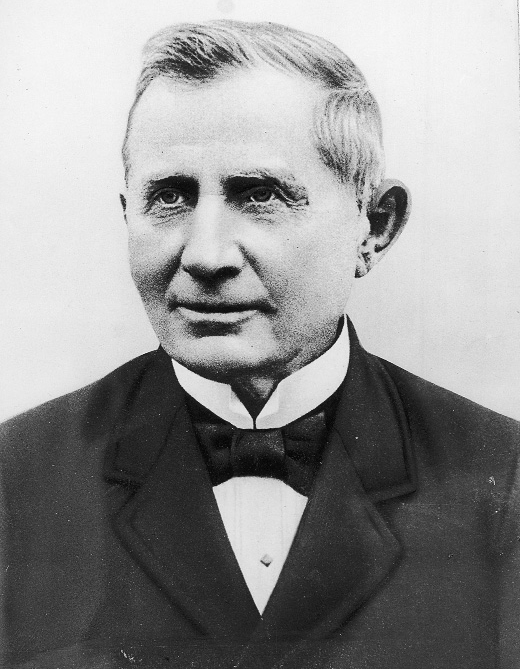
Ludwig Ingwer Nommensen

The first Protestant missionaries who tried to reach the Batak highlands of inner Northern Sumatra were English and American Baptist preachers in the 1820s and 1830s, but without any success. After Franz Wilhelm Junghuhn and Herman Neubronner van der Tuuk did intensive research on Batak language and culture in the 1840s, a new attempt was made in 1861 by several missionaries (Gerrit van Asselt, Friedrich Wilhelm Betz, Johann Carl Klammer and Wilhelm Heine). They held the first conference meeting on 7 October 1861 in Sipirok and sent out by the German Rhenish Missionary Society (RMG). The first Bataks were baptized during this year.

In August 1862, Ludwig Ingwer Nommensen of the RMG joined with other missionaries in Sipirok. He then reached the Batak inland regions on 11 November 1863, and founded a village called "Huta Dame" (village of peace) in May 1864 in the district of North Tapanuli Regency in Tarutung, North Sumatra. Nommensen successfully led the missionary expansion from Sipirok into the Batak inland regions, and in 1873 he established complex of church, school and hospital of the Christian mission at Pearaja, Tarutung, that eventually became the official headquarters of the Batak Christian Protestant Church. The RMG was associated with the uniting churches also called a merged denomination that includes a Lutheran element. However, Nommensen and local leaders developed an approach that applied local custom to Christian belief.

In 1868, a local seminary for the education of teachers was opened in Sipirok, and in 1877 a seminary for the education of preachers was built in Pansurnapitu. 1881, Nommensen was officially nominated "ephorus" of the Batak congregations by the RMG. In 1885, the first Batak ministers were ordained in Pearaja Tarutung, where the HKBP headquarters is still located.

In 1889, the RMG sent out Hester Needham who started the work with girls and women and later established the first Batak deaconess. In the last quarter of the 19th century, further missionaries of the RMG were sent out to the other Batak tribes (Angkola, Dairi, Simalungun, Karo, and Pakpak).

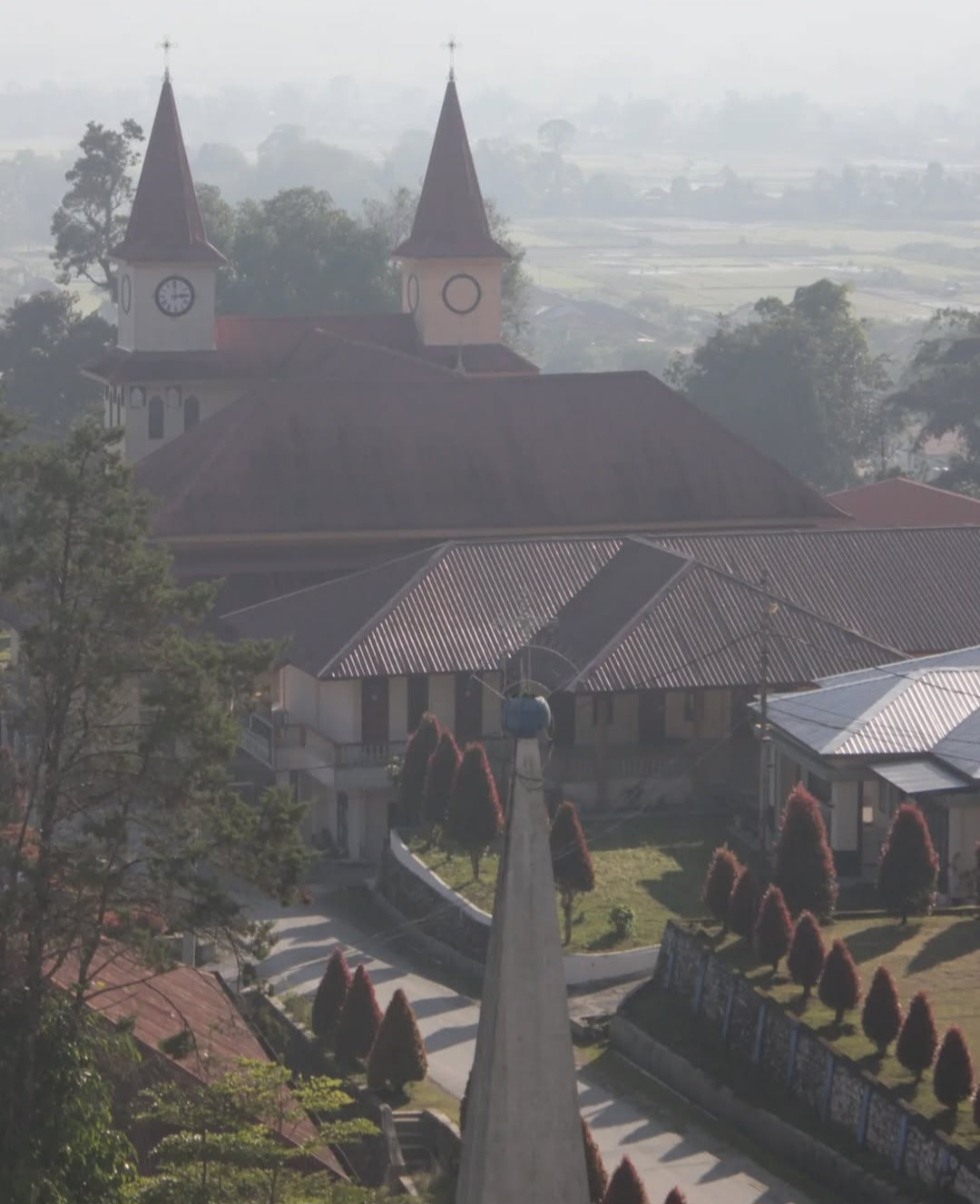
HKBP Headquarters Complex in Pearaja, Tarutung, North Sumatra

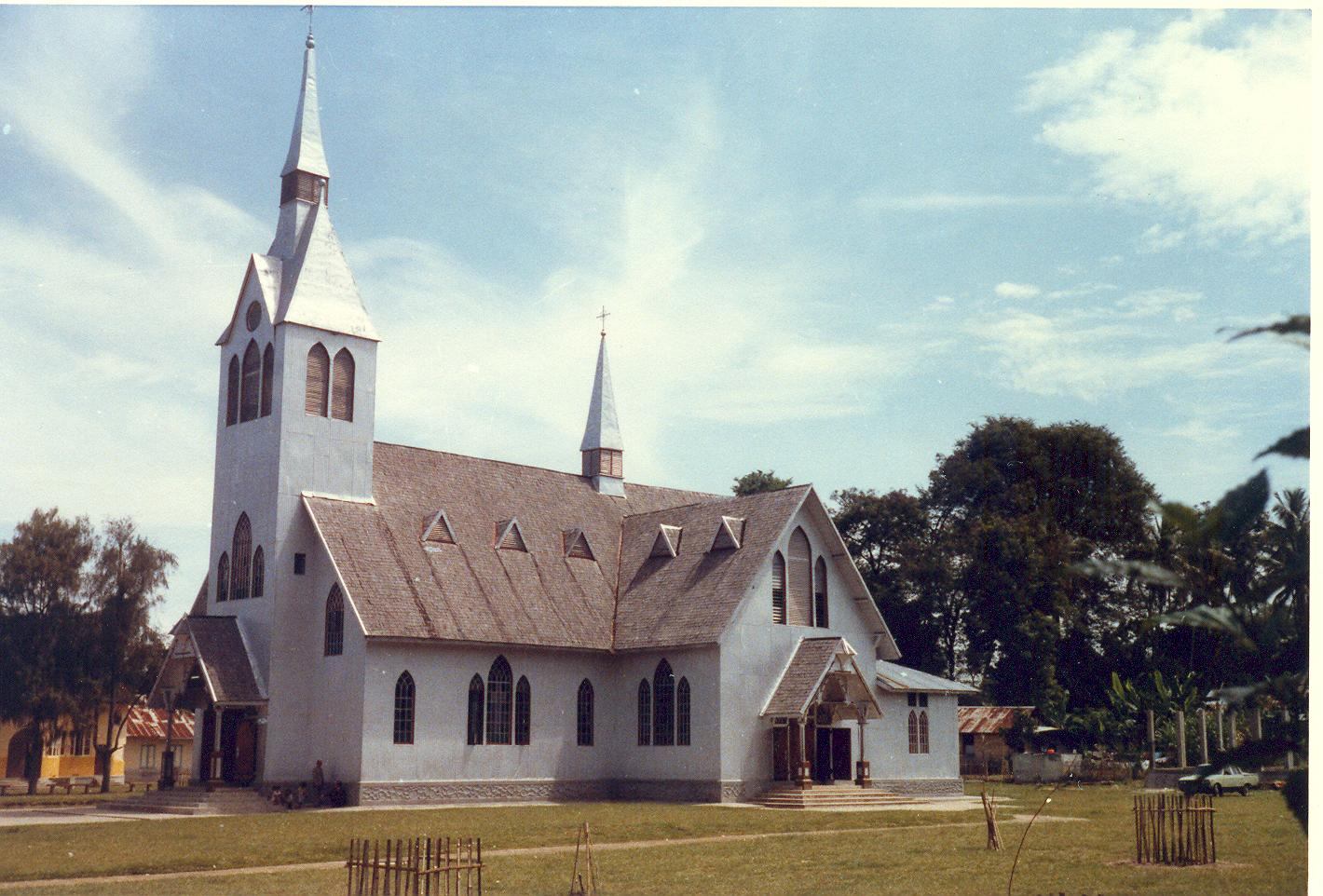
Church in Balige, North Sumatra, built since 1917

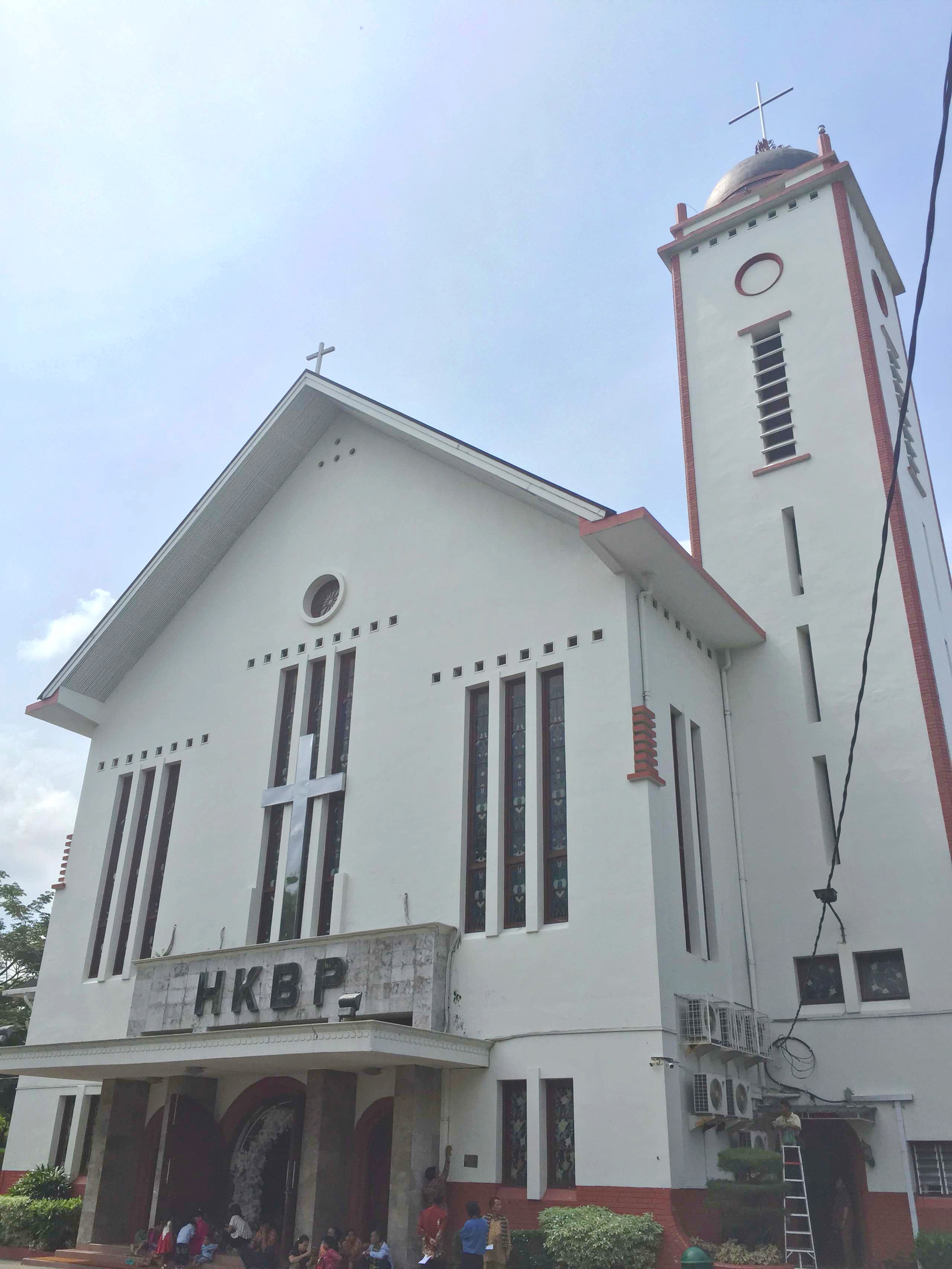
Church in Medan, North Sumatra, built since 1952

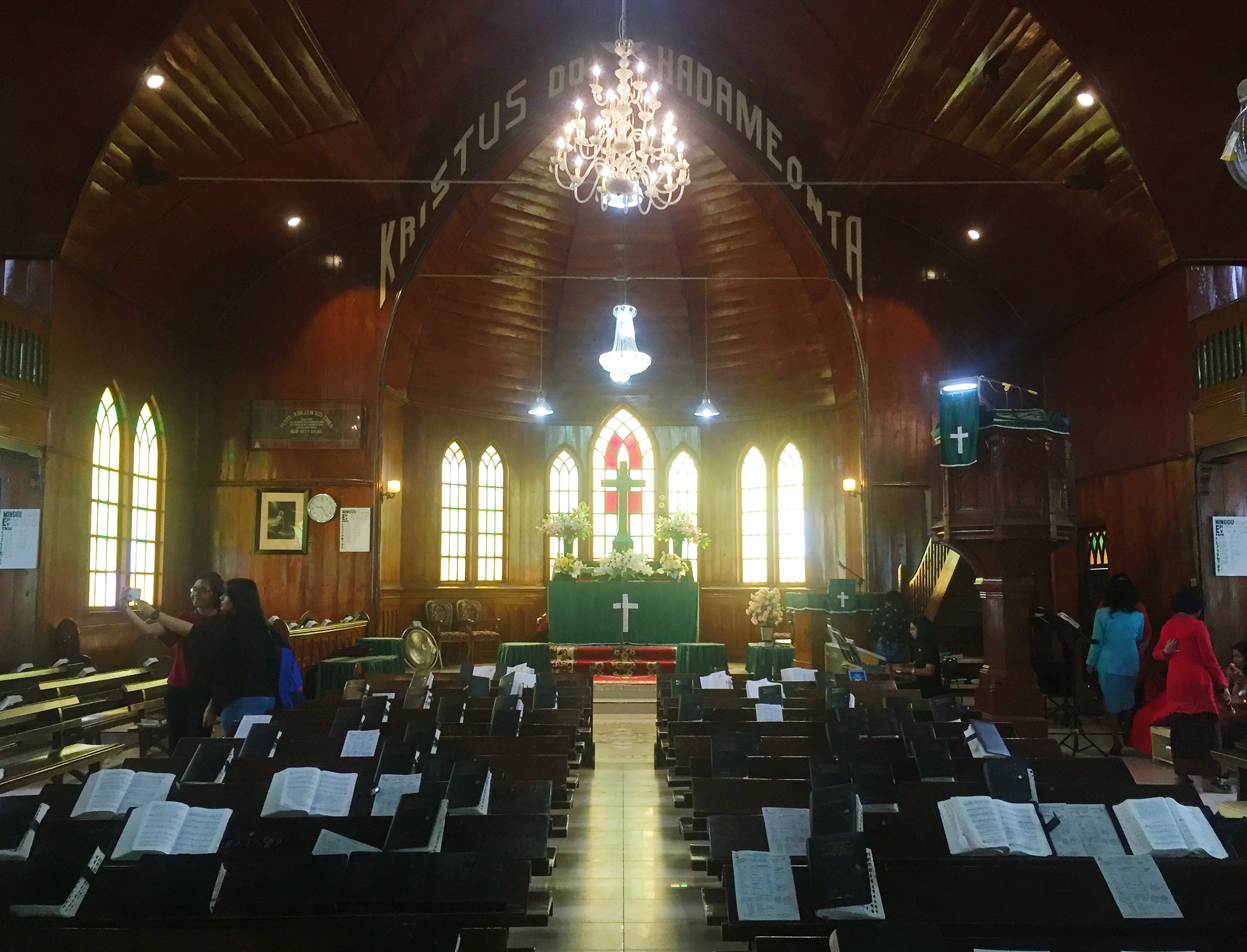
The Interior, Altar, and Pulpit of HKBP Balige

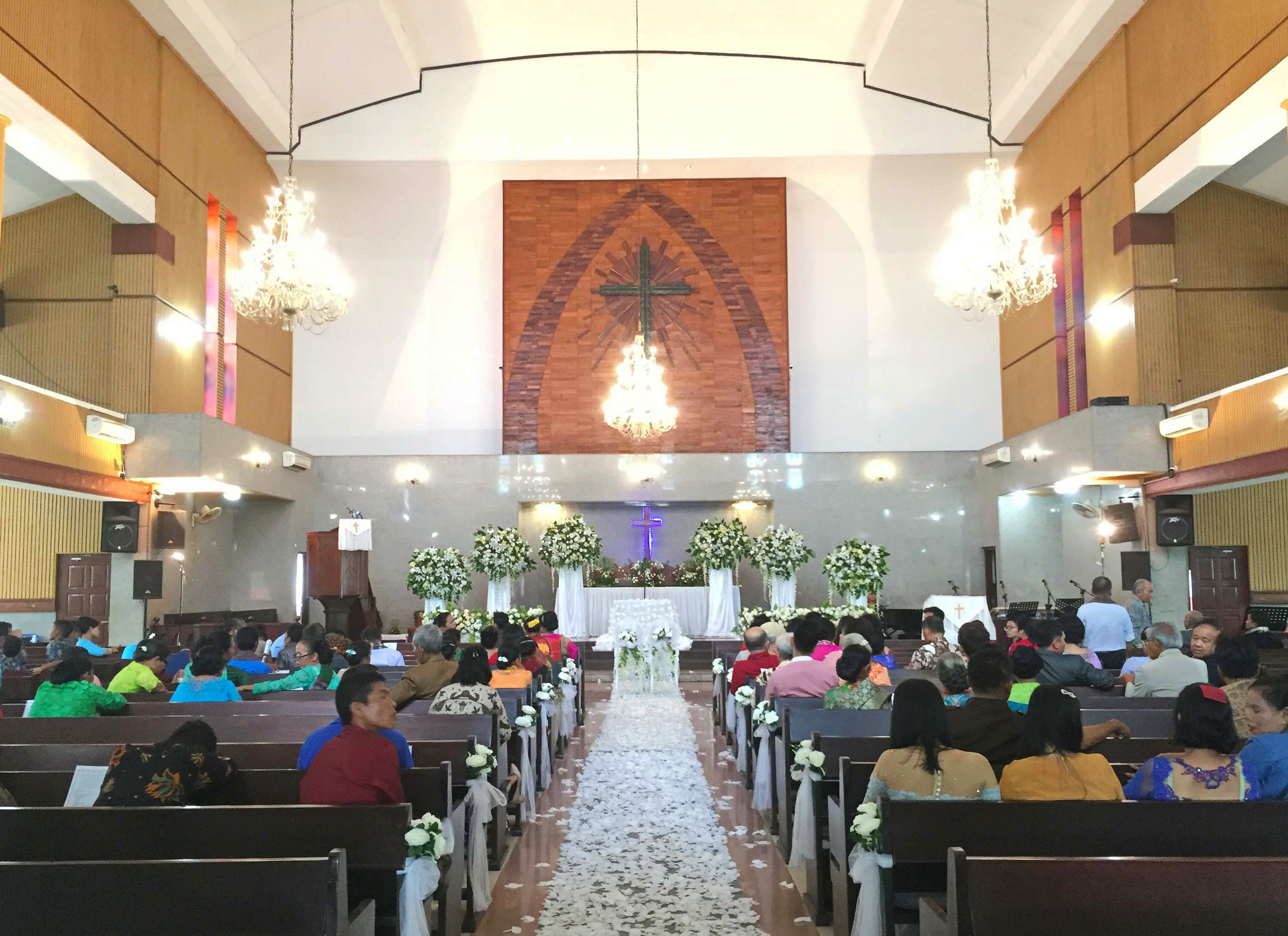
The Interior, Altar, and Pulpit of HKBP Medan Sudirman

In 1917, the "Hatopan Christen Batak" (HCB) which later became one of the nuclei for the independent Batak church, was founded in Tapanuli as a social movement.

In 1922, the first General Synod ("Sinode Godang") for all Batak congregations was held. In 1931 the HKBP became the first independent self-governing Christian body in what was then the Dutch East Indies.

In 1940, all Germans working for the RMG, including pastors and ministers, were detained by the Dutch government. The Rev. Sirait was chosen by the synod as the first indigenous ephorus of HKBP.

In 1952, while maintaining its indigenous character, the HKBP became a member of the Lutheran World Federation (LWF). In 1954, HKBP founded Nommensen University. In 1977, Sekolah Tinggi Theologia (STT or "Theological Seminary") HKBP split from Nommensen University.

Over the years, a number of church bodies have split from HKBP for various cultural and doctrinal reasons. However, HKBP remains the largest Indonesian LWF member by a factor of ten and also remains in communion with daughter church bodies through the LWF. Tarutung and the Batak lands region remain the stronghold for the HKBP in the predominantly Muslim nation of Indonesia, although worshippers are found throughout Indonesia and worldwide.

Well known HKBP congregants include Amir Sjarifuddin (the only Christian prime minister of Indonesia), Todung Sutan Gunung (TSG) Mulia (the second Indonesian education minister), and General Tahi Bonar (TB) Simatupang.

In January 2010 two churches were burnt down by extremist mobs in Sibuhuan.

== Nommensen Pietism ==
The HKBP represents a unique ecclesiastical phenomenon often described as Nommensen Pietism. While frequently classified under the Lutheran umbrella due to its membership in the Lutheran World Federation, the HKBP is a distinct denomination whose identity is defined by a synthesis of Rhenish Pietism, the Uniert (Union) tradition, and Batak customary law (Adat). This theological framework serves as a parallel to the Moravian Church, which similarly occupies a space between traditional Lutheranism and a specialized, heart-centric piety.

The roots of the HKBP lie in the Rhenish Missionary Society (RMG), founded in 1828 in Barmen, Germany. The RMG was a product of the German Pietist movement, specifically a branch that sought to move beyond the rigid doctrinal debates of 17th-century Lutheran Orthodoxy in favor of "living faith" and personal conversion. Unlike the state churches of Germany, the RMG was a "Union" mission, meaning it combined elements of both Lutheran and Reformed (Calvinist) traditions.

Ludwig Ingwer Nommensen arrived in Sumatra in 1862 carrying this Rhenish heritage. His approach, which established the foundation of Nommensen Pietism, was characterized by:

- Volkskirche (People's Church): A strategy in which the church was not merely a religious institution but the primary social and legal stabilizer for the Batak people.
- Cultural Transformation: Rather than abolishing Adat, Nommensen "baptized" it, integrating Christian ethics into the existing tribal social structure.
- Pietistic Discipline: An emphasis on communal singing, prayer meetings, and strict moral supervision, which continues to define the "vibe" of HKBP congregations today.

The HKBP is often mistakenly viewed as a mere branch of Lutheranism. However, several factors establish its status as a distinct denomination. While traditional Lutherans adhere strictly to the Book of Concord of 1580, the HKBP formulated its own Confessi HKBP in 1951. This document was created specifically to address the unique cultural and theological challenges of the Batak context, such as the relationship between the Gospel and ancestral traditions. Because of its RMG origins, the HKBP retains a hybrid liturgy and a view of the sacraments that incorporates Reformed influences, making it technically Evangelical Lutheran-leaning rather than Confessional Lutheran. Much like the Moravian Church (Unitas Fratrum), the HKBP maintains a sister relationship with Lutheranism but remains independent. For Moravians, it is the "Heart-Relationship with the Savior"; for the HKBP, it is the "Community of the Batak People under Christ." Both groups are members of the LWF, but they do so as autonomous partners who contribute a unique pietistic spirit that standard Lutheranism often lacks.

== Ecumenical relations ==
HKBP is a member of and participant in:

Organisation	Member since	Note & Ref.
World Council of Churches	1948	
Communion of Churches in Indonesia	1950	Founding member.
Lutheran World Federation	1952	
Christian Conference of Asia	1957	Founding member.
United Evangelical Mission	1996	

== Agenda ==
The book of liturgical procedure used by the HKBP is referred to as the "Agenda" or formerly as the "Agende". This term comes from the European Protestant use of agenda.

== Leaders ==
=== Ephoruses ===
No.	Name	From	Until	Notes
1.	The Rt Rev. Ludwig Ingwer Nommensen	1881	1918	First ephorus
2.	The Rev. Valentin Kessel	1918	1920	Temporary officeholder of Ephorus, due to the First World War preventing Johannes Warneck from arriving.
3.	The Rev. Johannes Warneck	1920	1932	
4.	The Rev. P. Landgrebe	1932	1936	
5.	The Rev. E. Verwiebe	1936	1940	Interned by the Dutch colonial government after the German invasion of the Netherlands.
6.	The Rev. K. Sirait	1940	1942	The first Batak that became Ephorus.
7.	The Rev. Justin Sihombing	1942	1962	
8.	The Rev T. S. Sihombing	1962	1974	Elected in Special General Synod.
9.	The Rev. G. H. M. Siahaan	1974	1986	
10.	The Rev. S. A. E. Nababan	1986	1998	HKBP Crisis happened from 1992 to 1998 that resulted in dualism of HKBP's leadership until 1998.
11.	The Rev. S. M. Siahaan (as Bishop or Ephorus)	1992	1993	
12.	The Rev. P. W. T. Simanjuntak	1993	1998	Elected in Special General Synod.
13.	The Rev. J.R. Hutauruk	1998	1998	Elected as temporary officeholder of Bishop.
13.	The Rev. J.R. Hutauruk	1998	2004	Elected in Reconciliation General Synod.
14.	The Rev. Bonar Napitupulu	2004	2008	
14.	The Rev. Bonar Napitupulu	2008	2012	Elected in the 59th HKBP General Synod in Sipolohon Seminarium.
15.	The Rev. W. T. P. Simarmata	2012	2016	Elected in the 61st HKBP General Synod in Sipolohon Seminarium.
16.	The Rev. Darwin Lumbantobing	2016	2020	Elected in the 62nd HKBP General Synod in Sipolohon Seminarium.
17.	The Rev. Robinson Butarbutar	2020	2024	Elected in the 65th HKBP General Synod in Sipolohon Seminarium.
18.	The Rev. Victor Tinambunan	2024	2028	Elected in the 67th HKBP General Synod in Sipolohon Seminarium.

=== General secretaries ===
No.	Name	From	Until	Notes
1.	The Rev. Karimuda Sitompul	1950	1957	First Secretary General of HKBP
2.	The Rev. T. S. Sihombing	1957	1962	
3.	The Rev. G. H. M. Siahaan	1962	1974	
4.	The Rev. F. H. Sianipar	1974	1978	
5.	The Rev. P. M. Sihombing	1978	1986	
6.	The Rev. O. P. T. Simorangkir	1986	1992	
7.	The Rev. S. M. Siahaan	1992	1998	
8.	The Rev. W. T. P. Simarmata	1998	2008	
9.	The Rev. Ramlan Hutahaean	2008	2012	
10.	The Rev. Mory Sihombing	2012	2016	
11.	The Rev. David F. Sibuea	2016	2020	
12.	The Rev. Victor Tinambunan	2020	2024	
13.	The Rev. Rikson Hutahaean	2024	2028	

=== Head of Koinonia Department ===
No.	Name	From	Until	Notes
1.	The Rev. Bistok M. Siagian	2004	2008	
2.	The Rev. Jamilin Sirait	2008	2012	
3.	The Rev. Welman P. Tampubolon	2012	2016	
4.	The Rev. Martongo Sitinjak	2016	2020	
5.	The Rev. Deonal Sinaga	2020	2028	

=== Head of Marturia Department ===
No.	Name	From	Until	Notes
1.	The Rev. Manumpan H. Sihite	2004	2008	
2.	The Rev. Binsar Nainggolan	2008	2012	
3.	The Rev. Marolop P. Sinaga	2012	2016	
4.	The Rev. Anna Ch. Vera Pangaribuan	2016	2020	
5.	The Rev. Kardi Simanjuntak	2020	2022	
6.	The Rev. Daniel T. A. Harahap	2022	2024	
7.	The Rev. Bernard Manik	2024	2028	

=== Head of Diakonia Department ===
No.	Name	From	Until	Notes
1.	The Rev. Nelson F. Siregar	2004	2012	
2.	The Rev. Bihelman D. F. Sidabutar	2012	2016	
3.	The Rev. Debora Purada Sinaga	2016	2024	
4.	The Rev. Eldarton Simbolon	2024	2028	

== Gallery ==
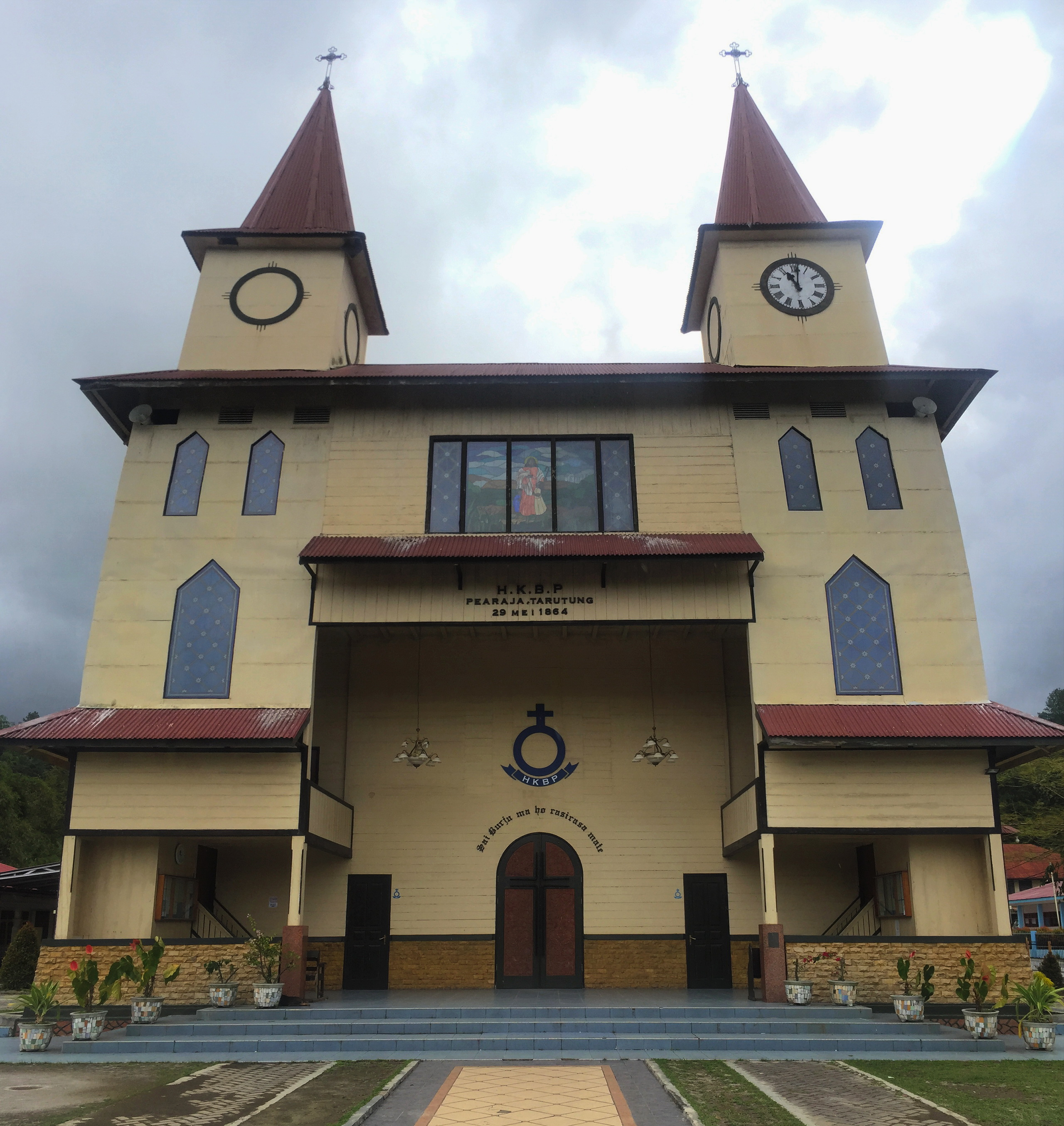
HKBP Church in Pearaja, Tarutung, North Sumatra. The church is located within HKBP Headquarters complex

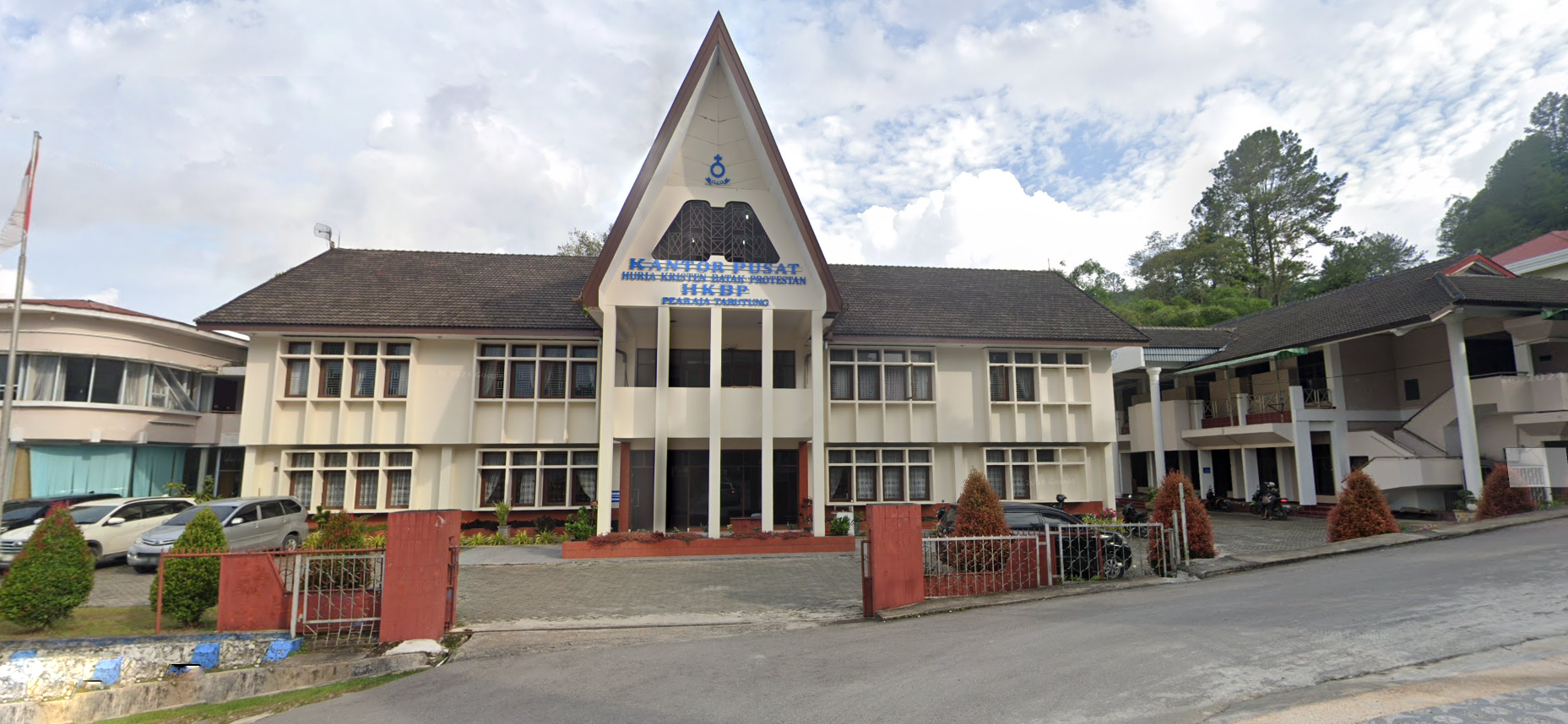
HKBP Headquarters in Pearaja, Tarutung, North Sumatra

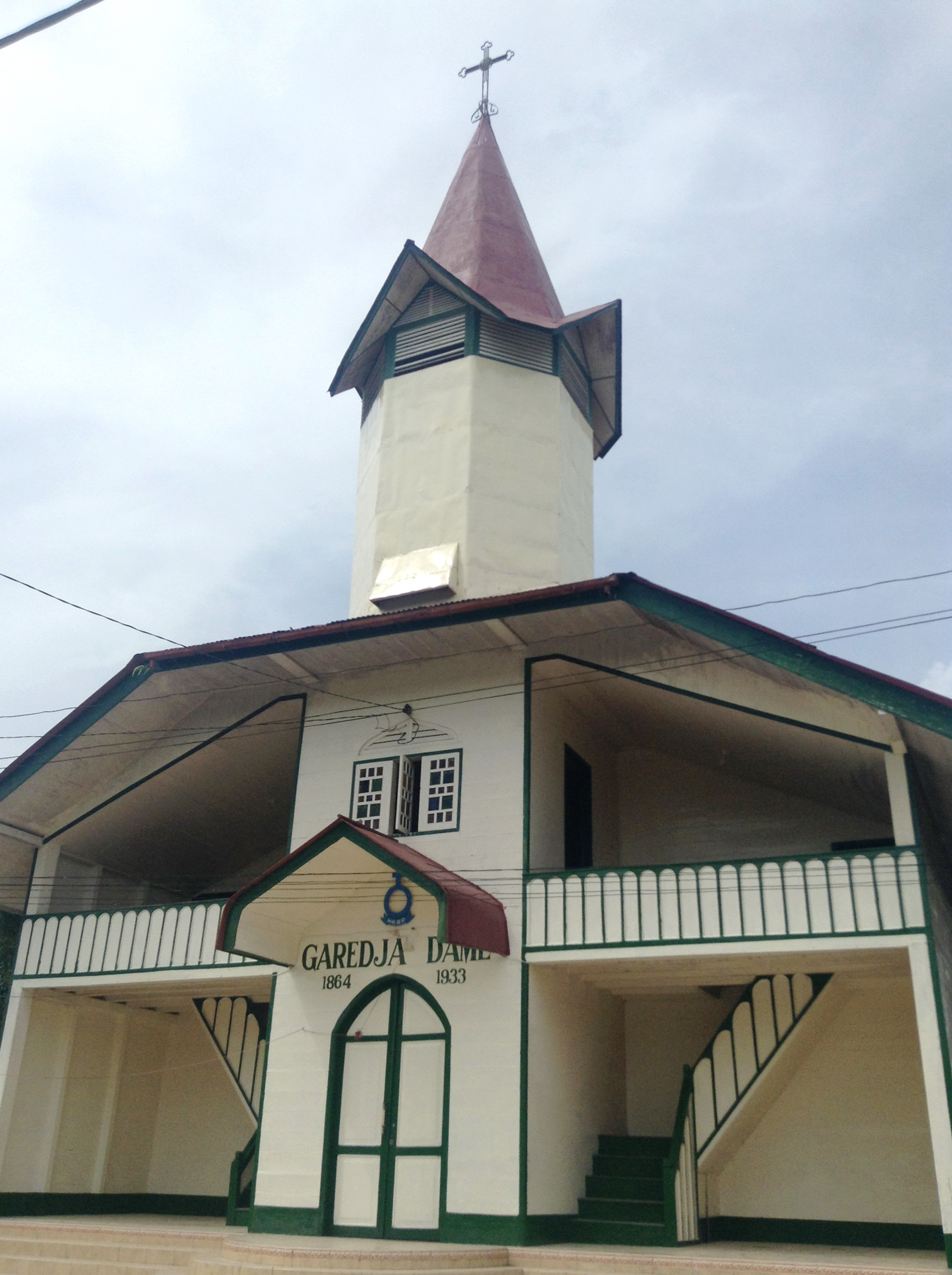
HKBP Church in Dame Saitnihuta, Tarutung, North Sumatra. The church is the first to be built by Nommensen.

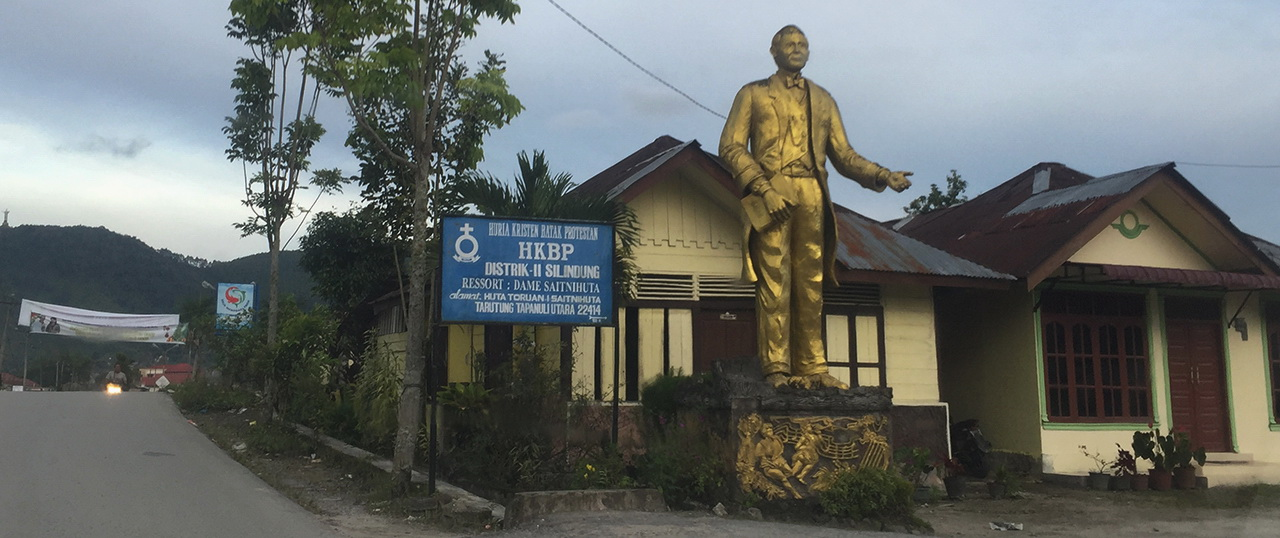
Nommensen statue at the HKBP Church in Dame Saitnihuta, Tarutung, North Sumatra

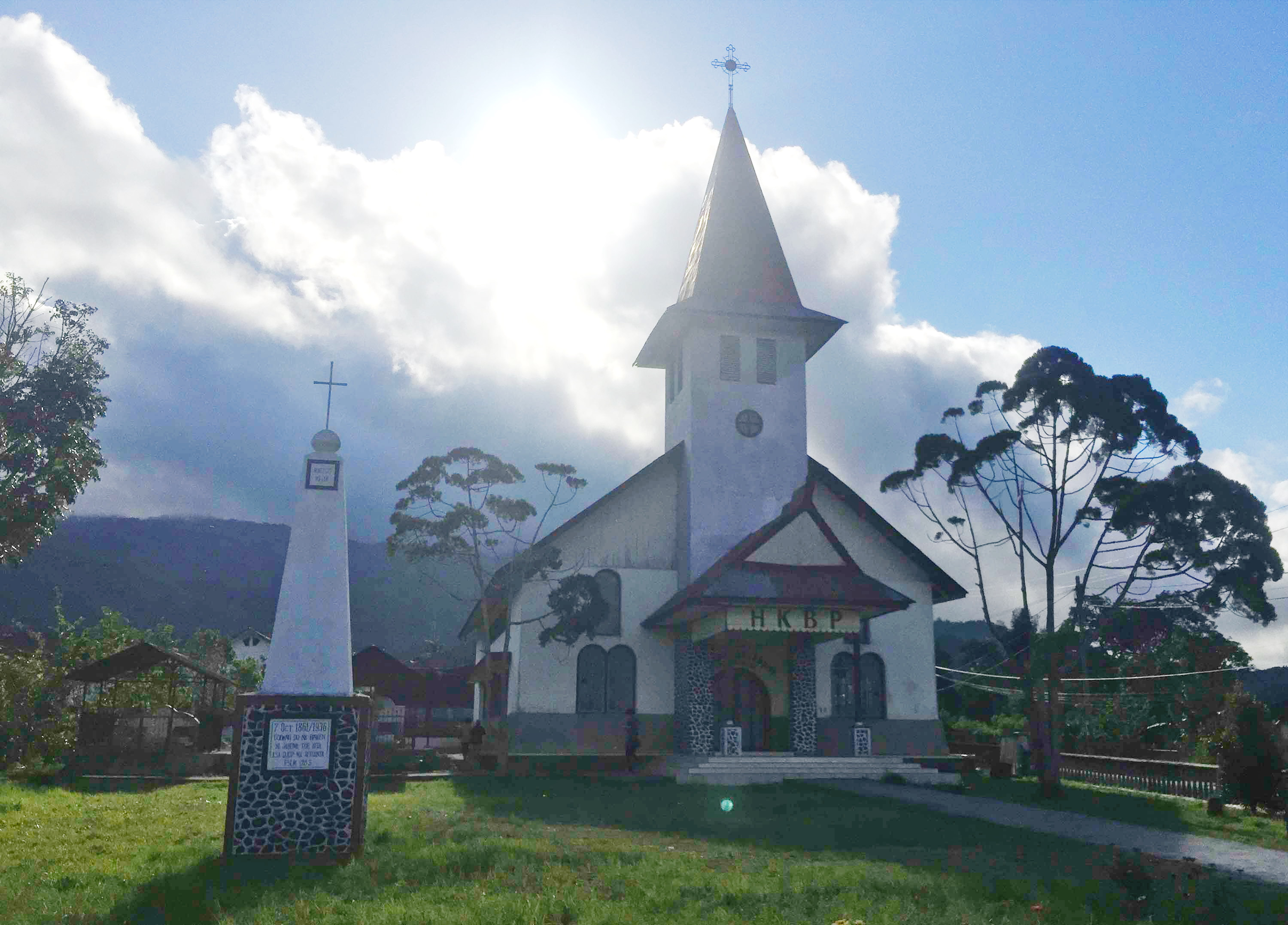
HKBP Church in Sipirok, South Tapanuli Regency, North Sumatra

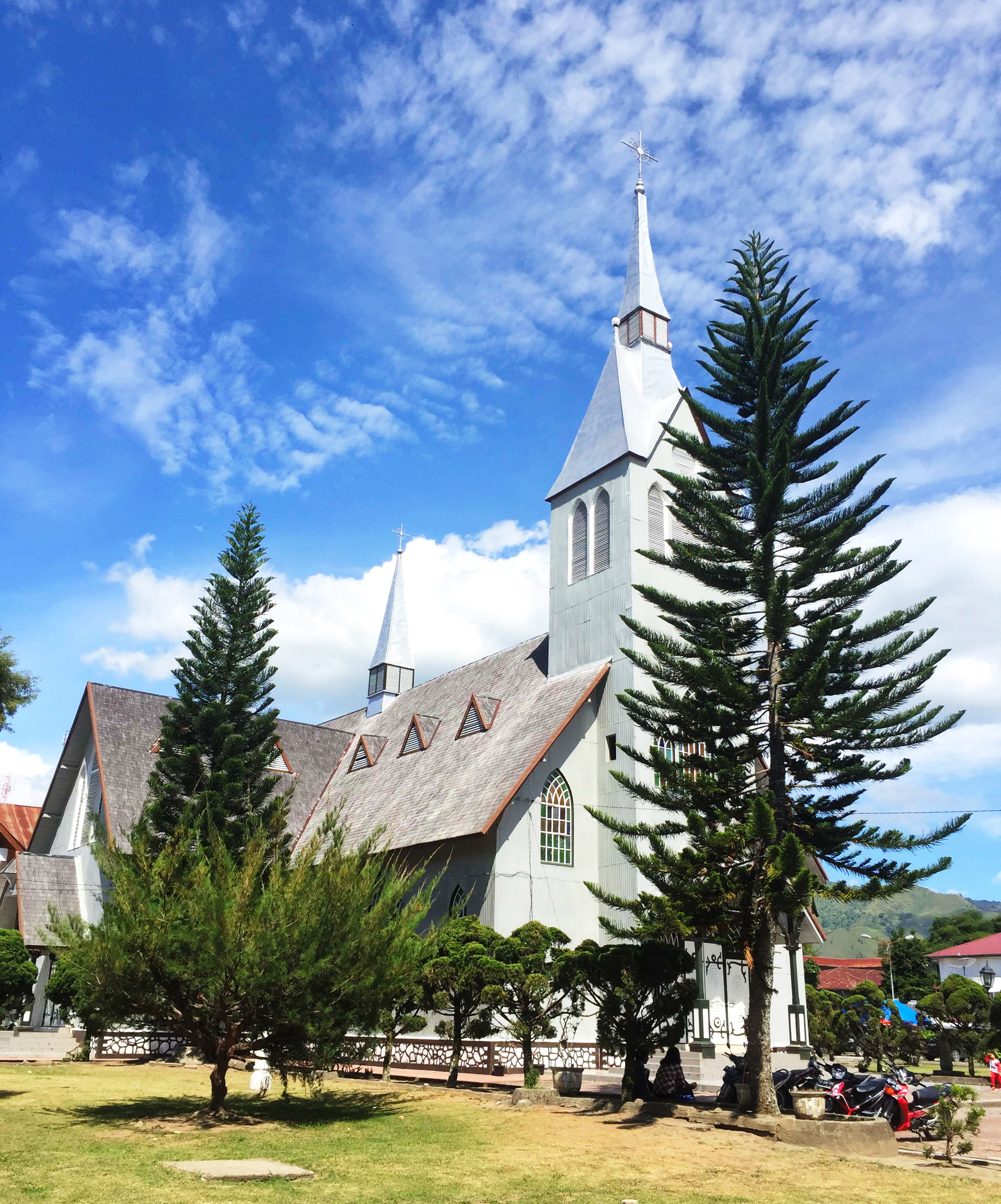
HKBP Church in Balige, Toba Regency, North Sumatra

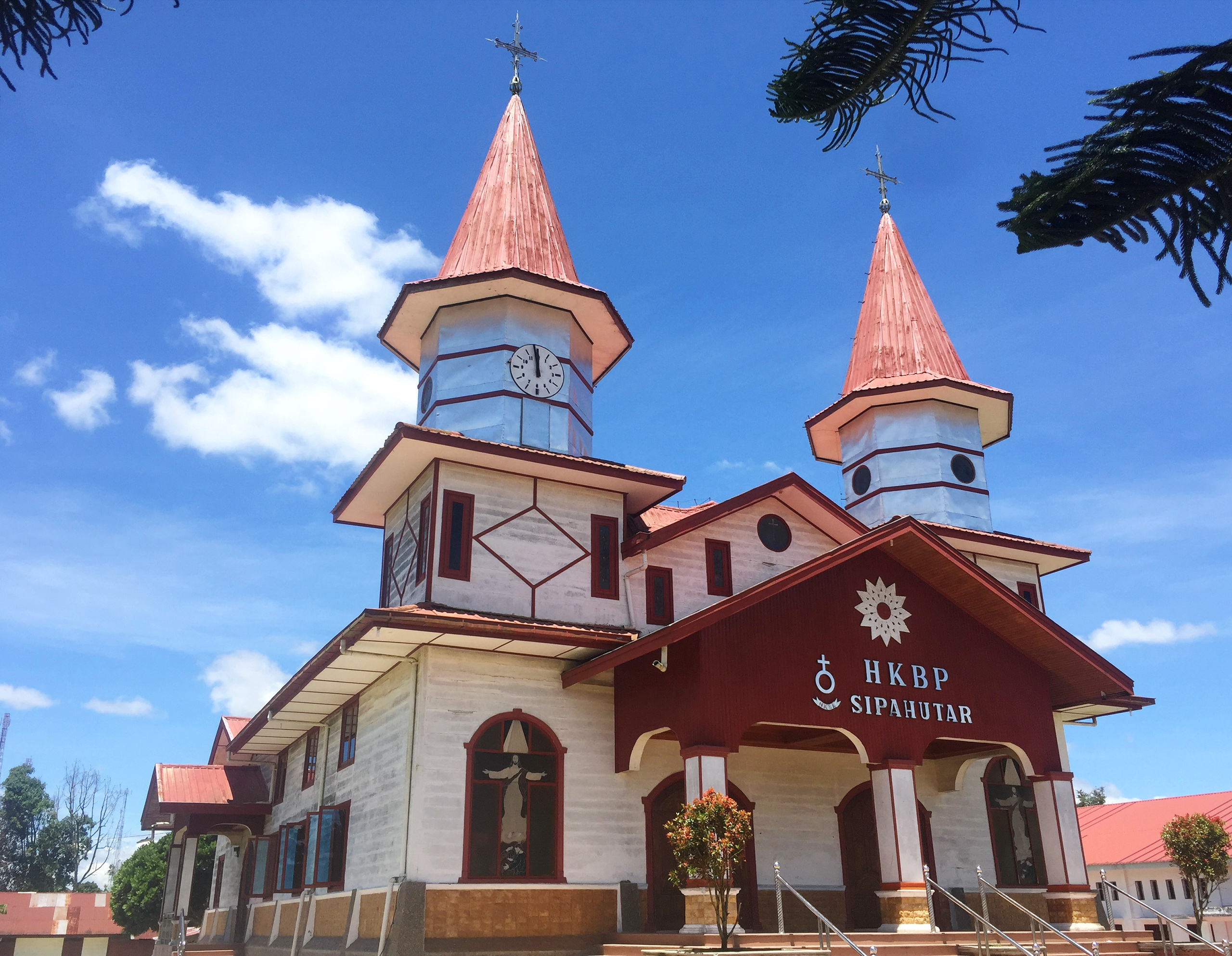
HKBP Church in Sipahutar, North Tapanuli Regency, North Sumatra

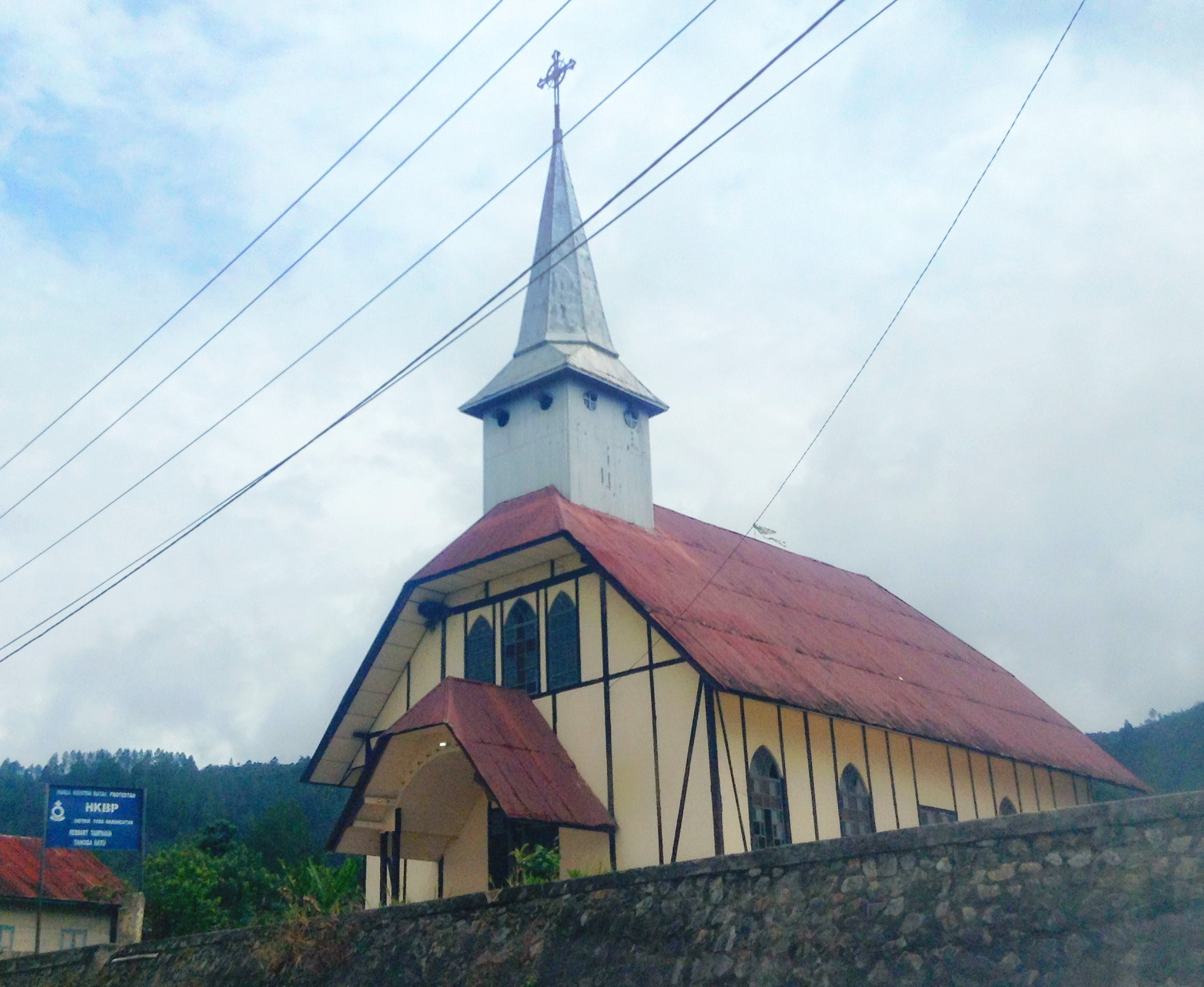
HKBP Church in Tangga Batu, Toba Regency, North Sumatra

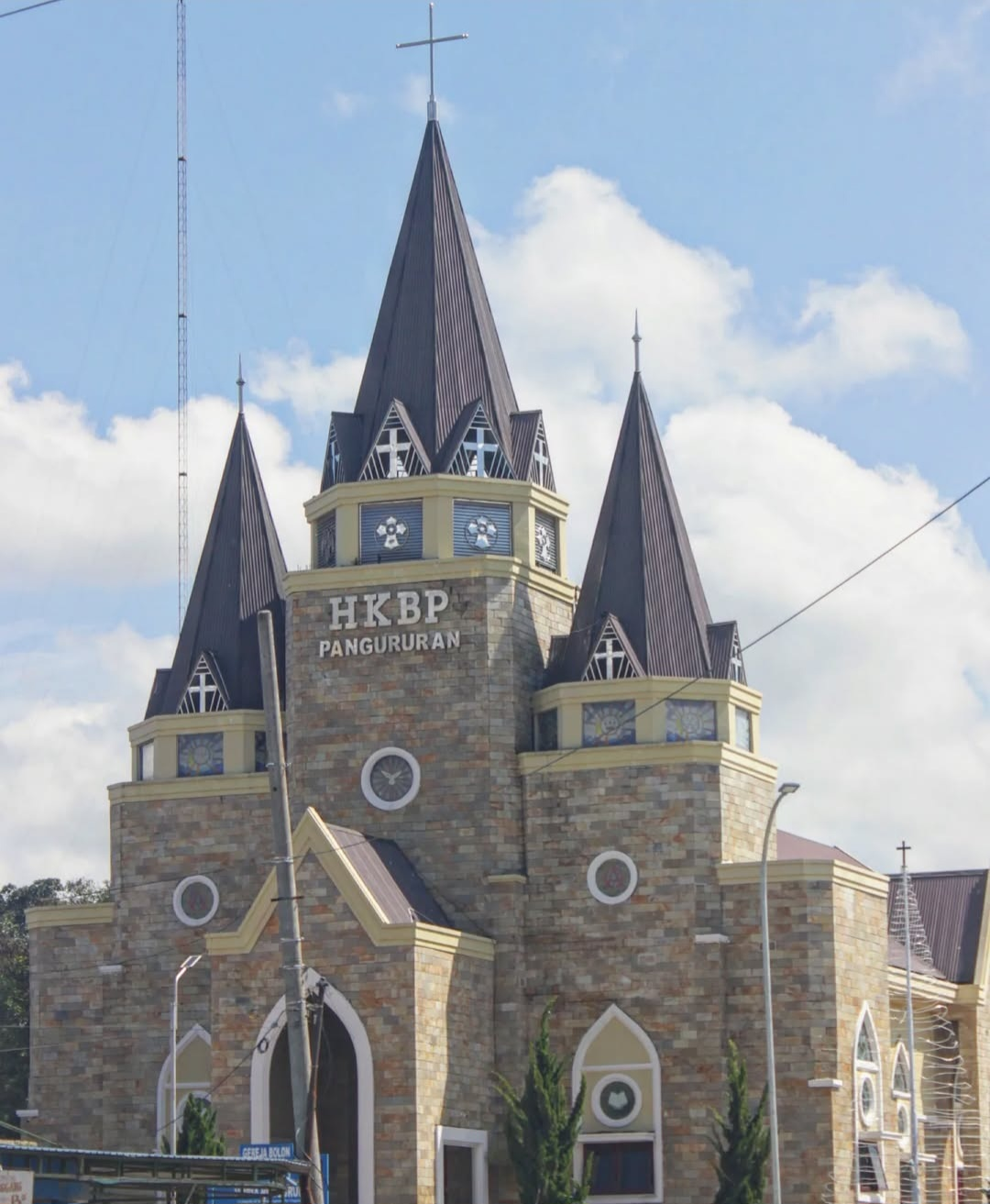
HKBP Church in Pangururan, Samosir Regency, North Sumatra

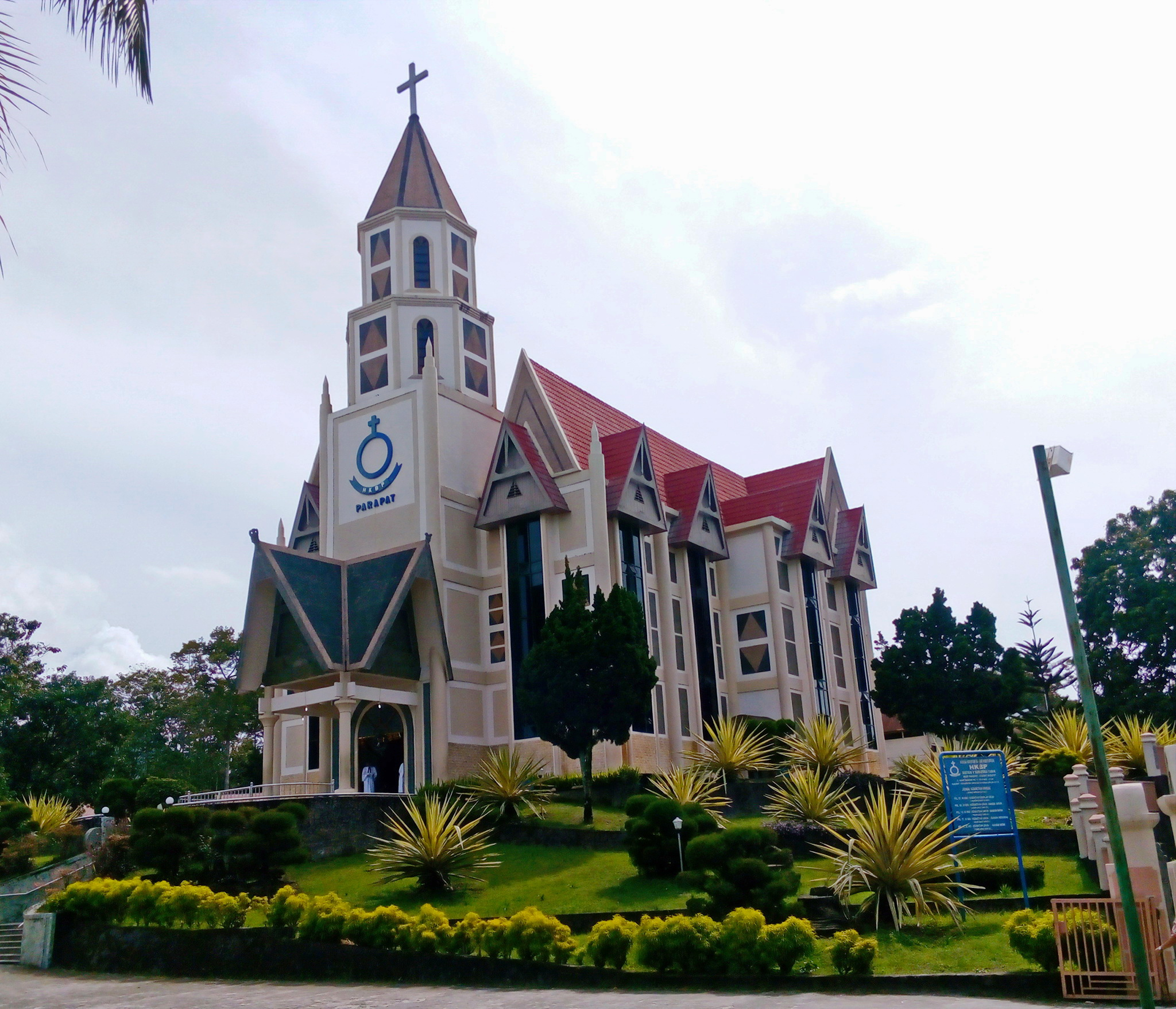
HKBP Church in Parapat, Simalungun Regency, North Sumatra

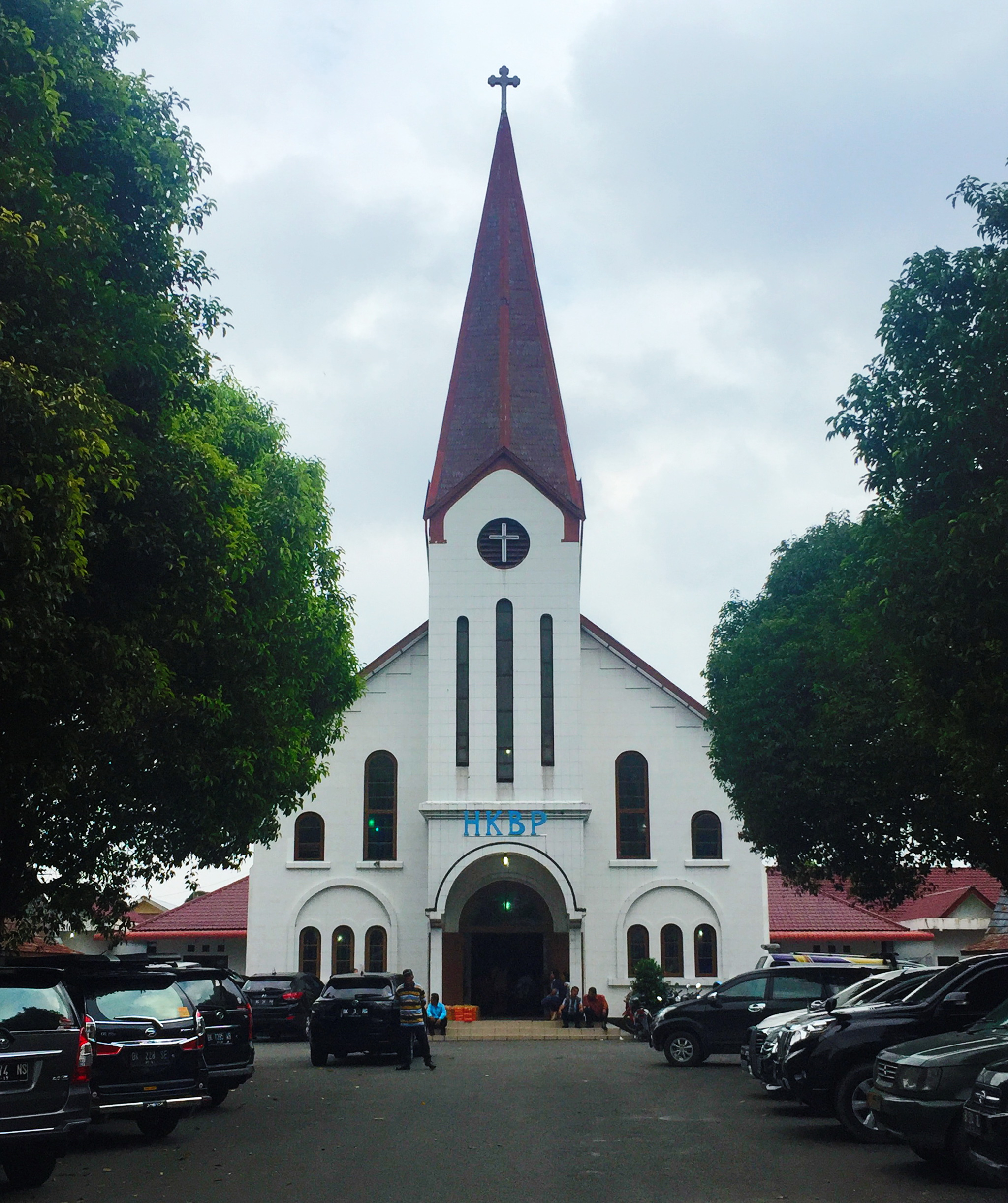
HKBP Church in Pematangsiantar, North Sumatra

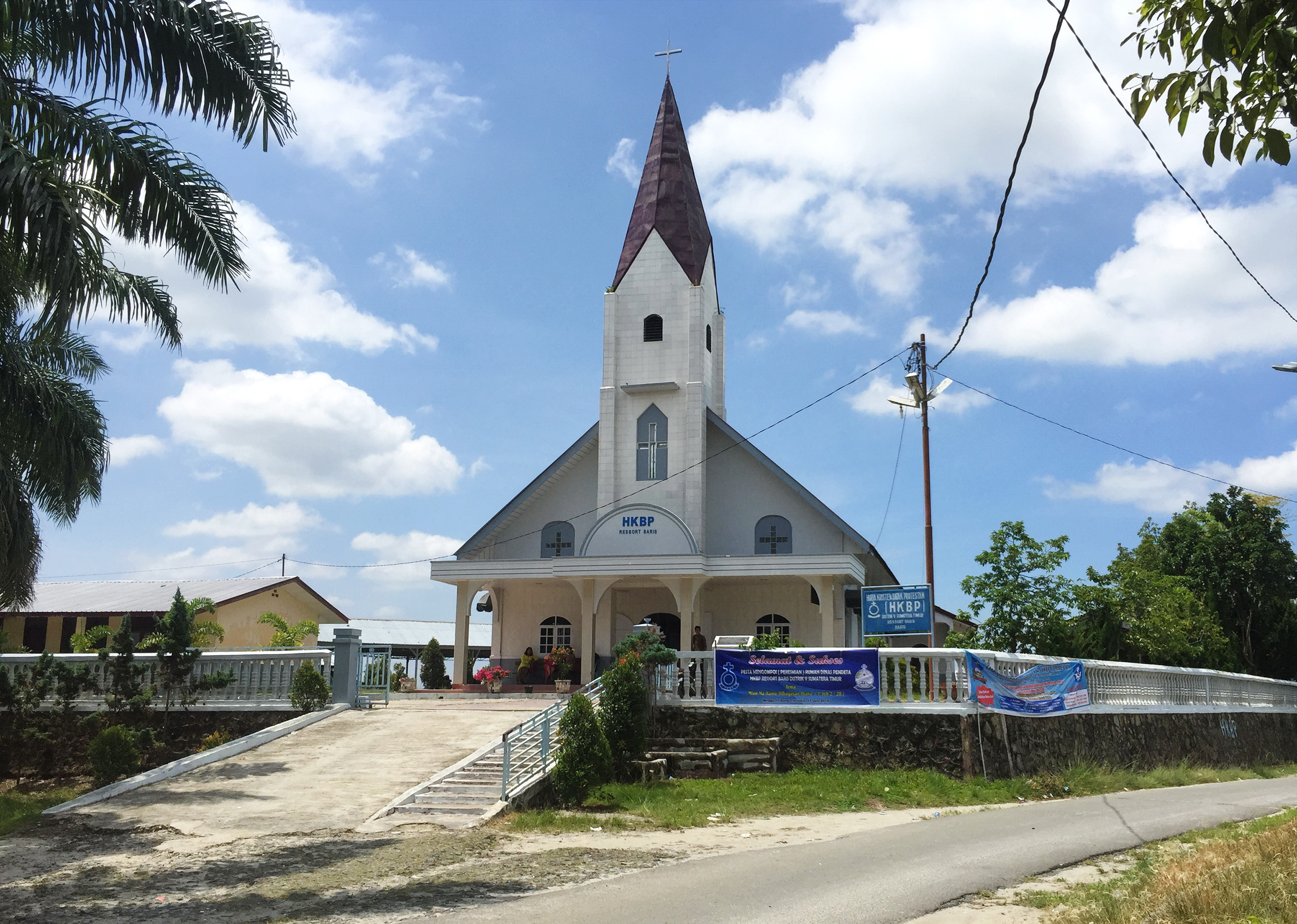
HKBP Church in Baris, Pematangsiantar, North Sumatra

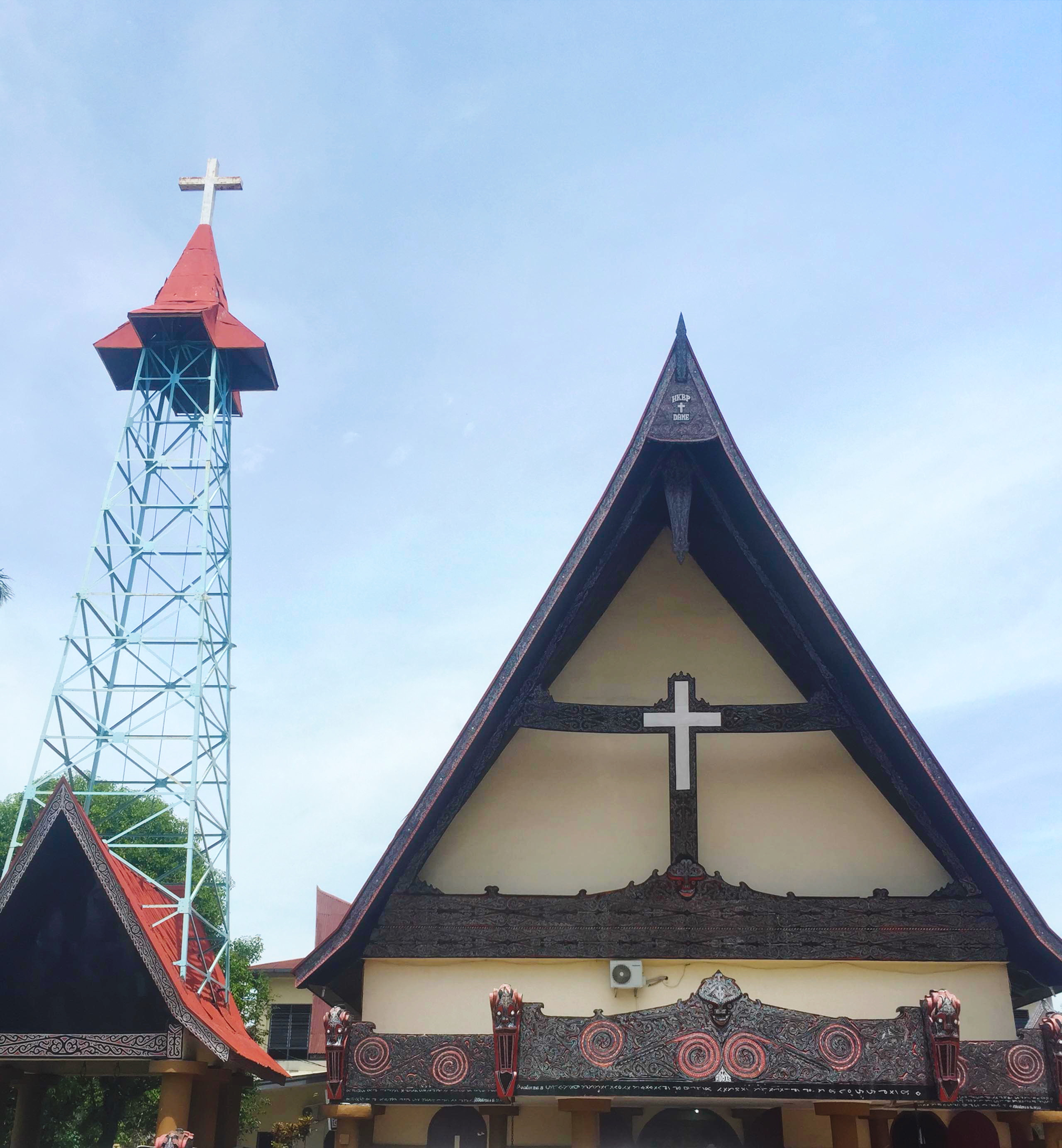
HKBP Church in Dame, Pematangsiantar, North Sumatra

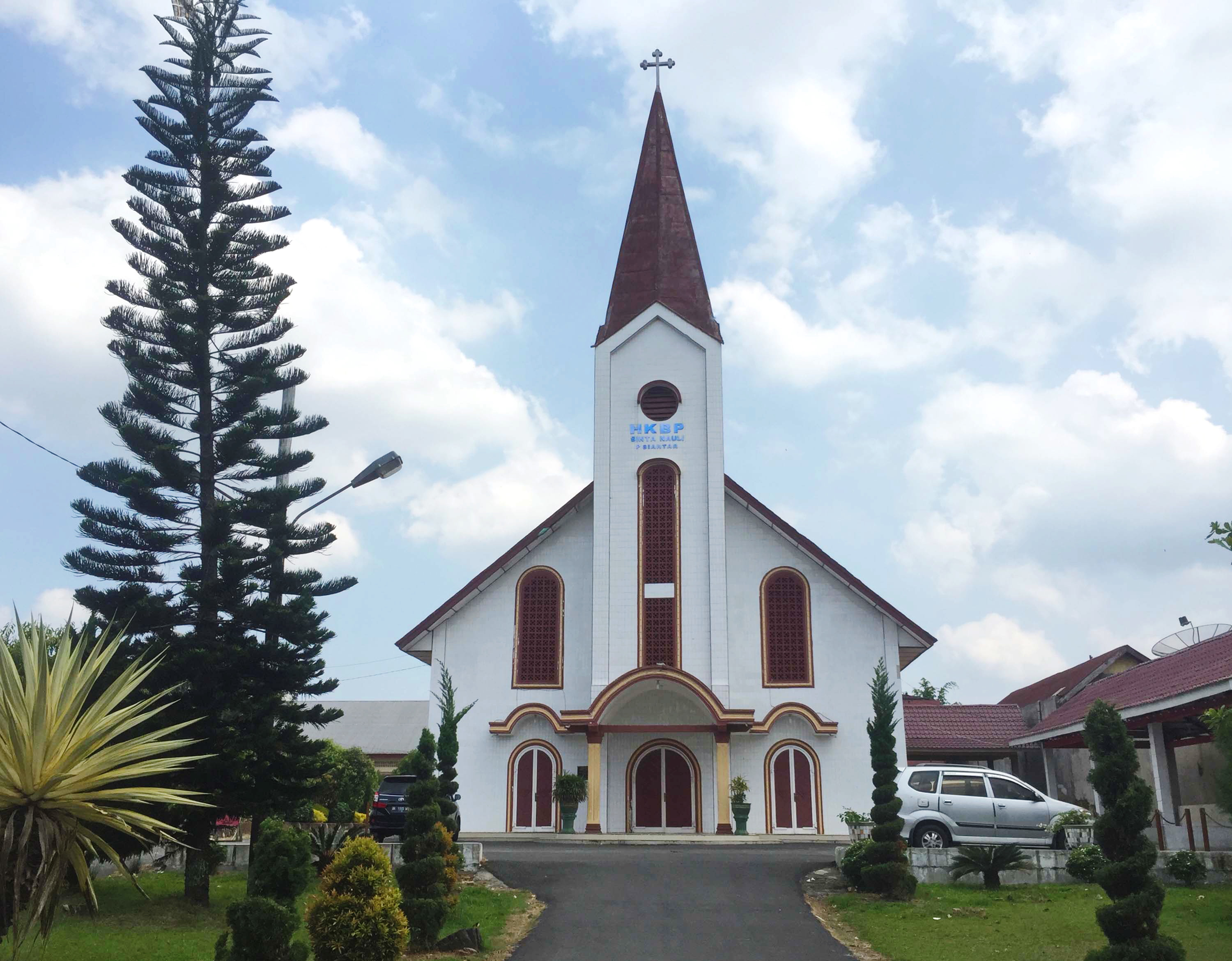
HKBP Church in Sinta Nauli, Pematangsiantar, North Sumatra

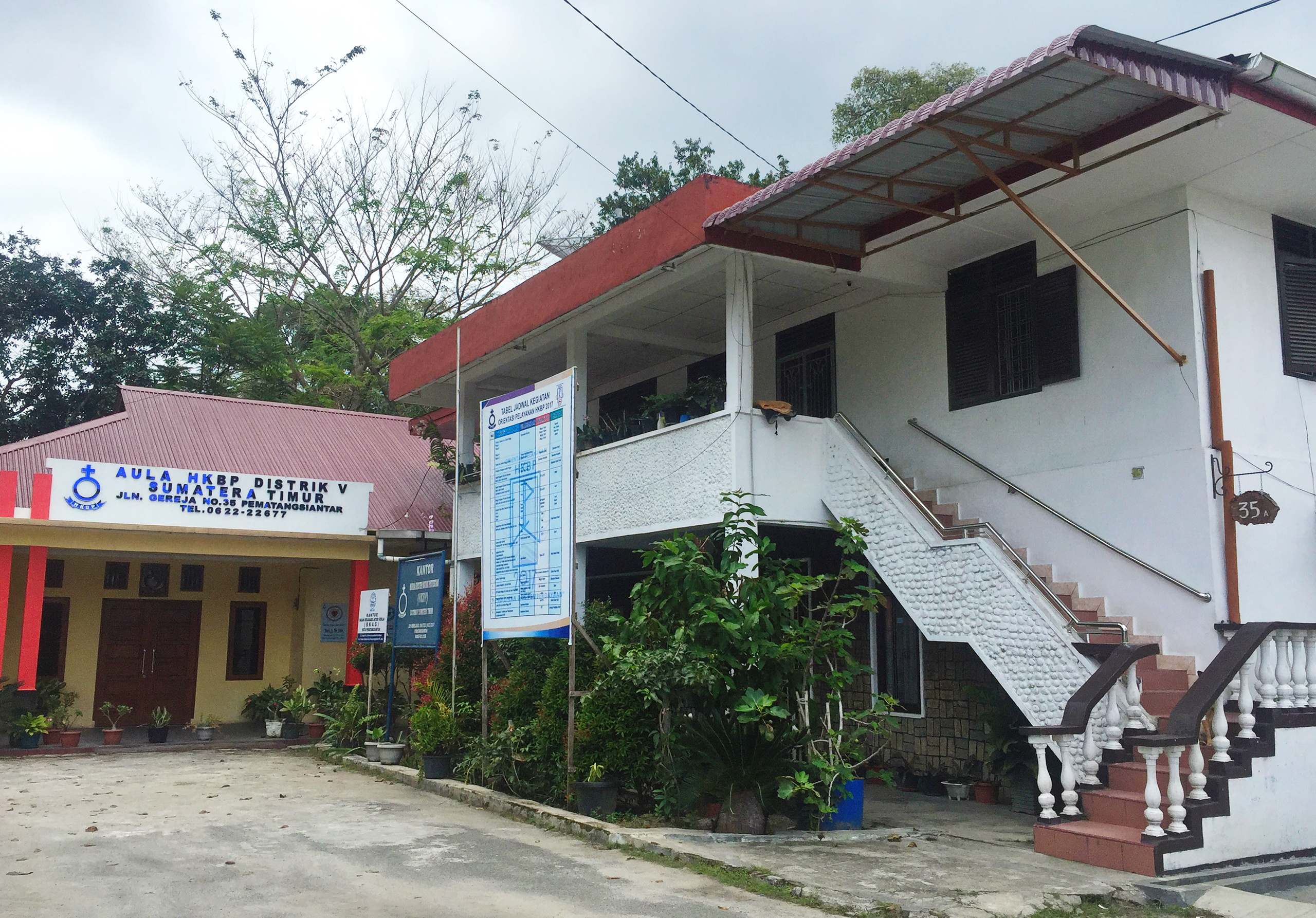
Headquarters of HKBP's District V of East Sumatra, located within HKBP Pematangsiantar complex

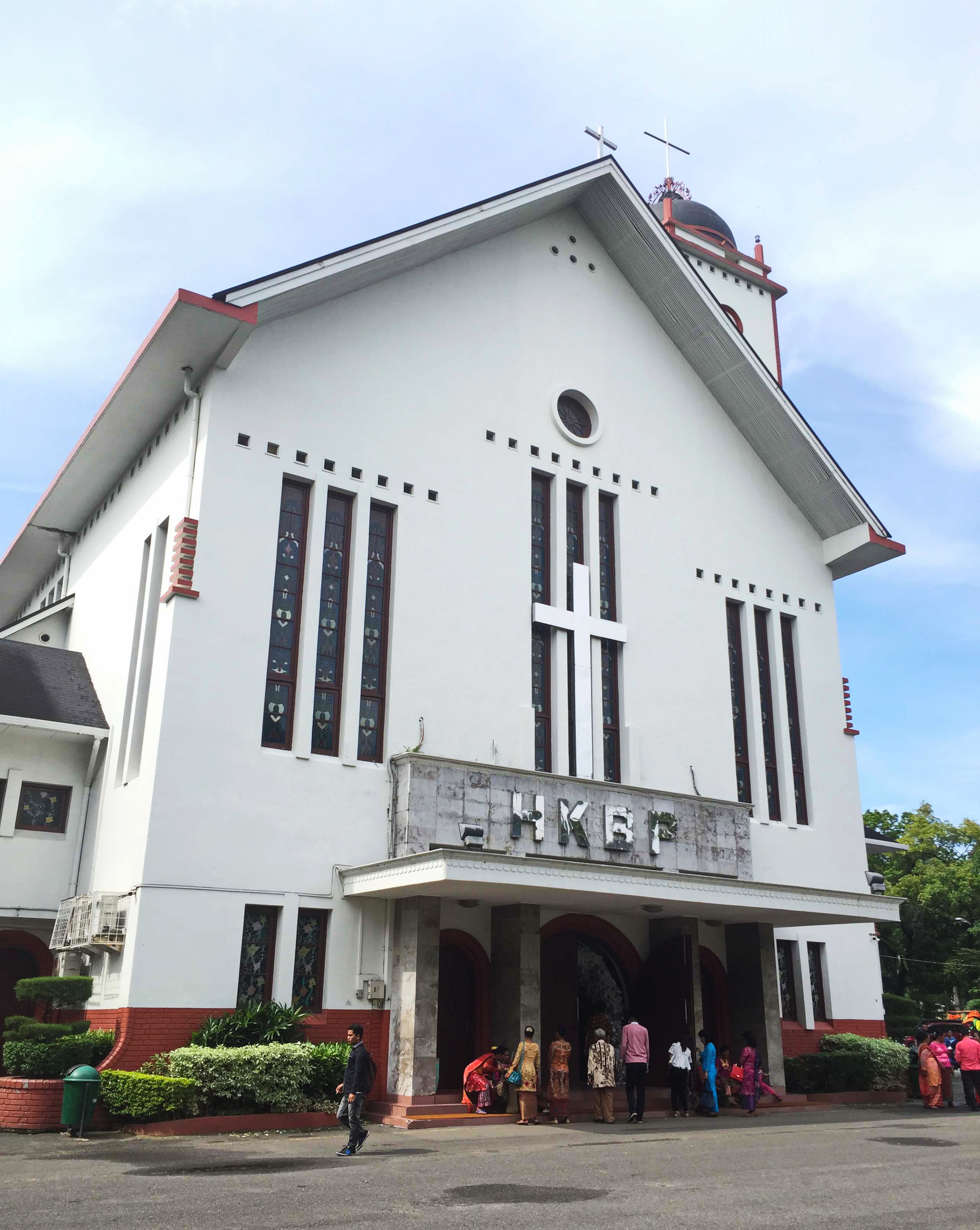
HKBP Church on Sudirman Road, Medan, North Sumatra

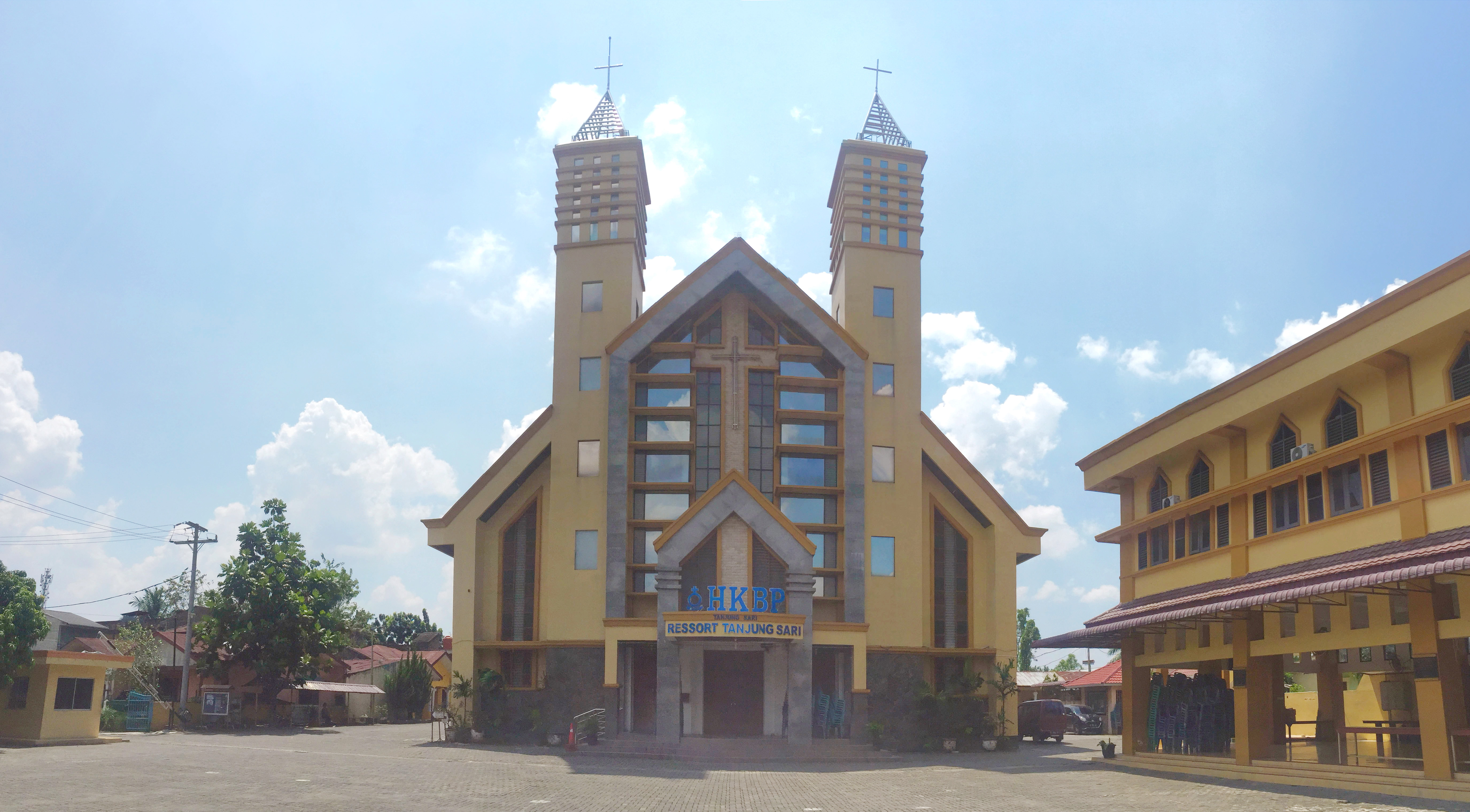
HKBP Church in Tanjung Sari, Medan, North Sumatra

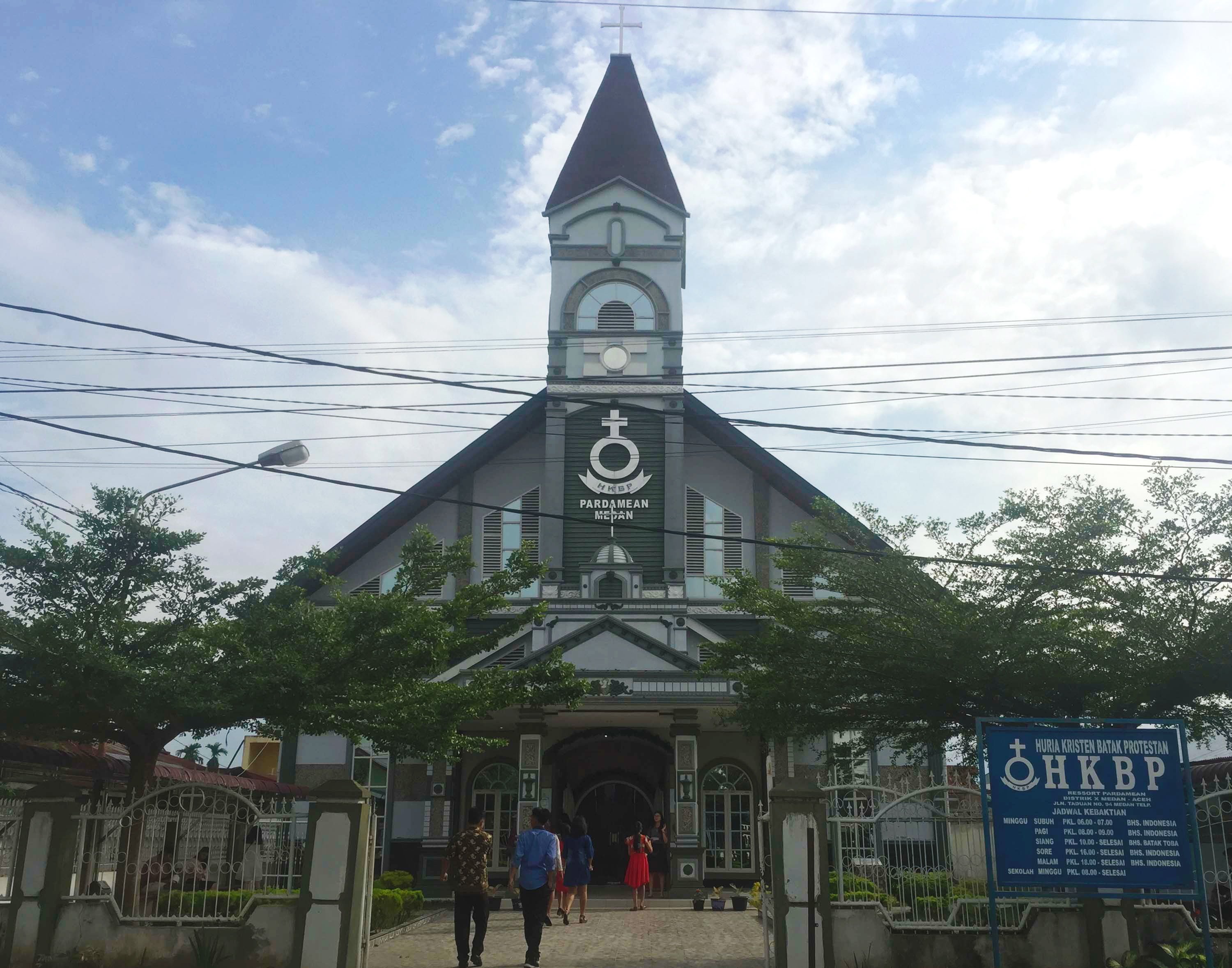
HKBP Church in Pardamean, Medan, North Sumatra

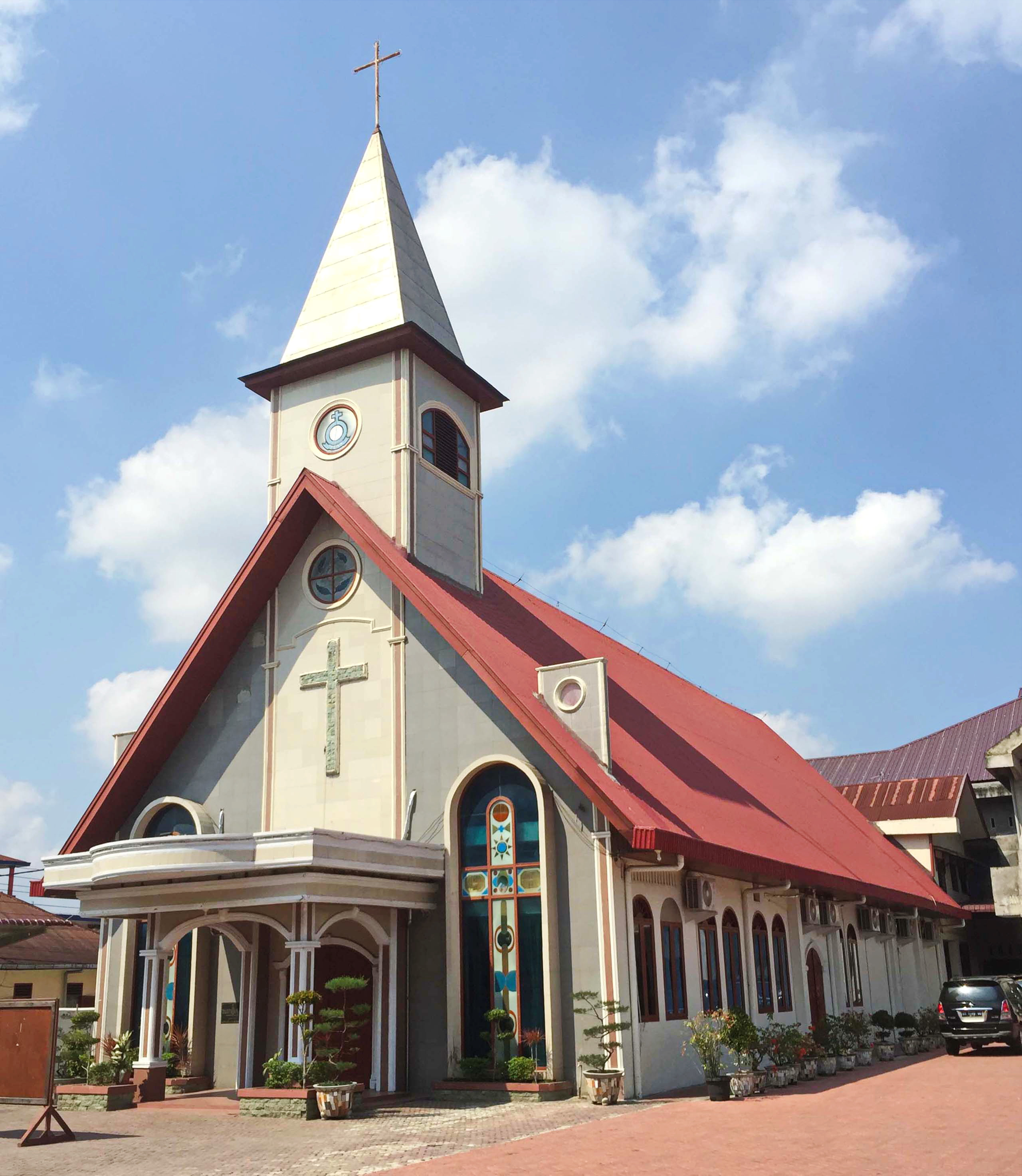
HKBP Church in Pardomuan, Medan, North Sumatra

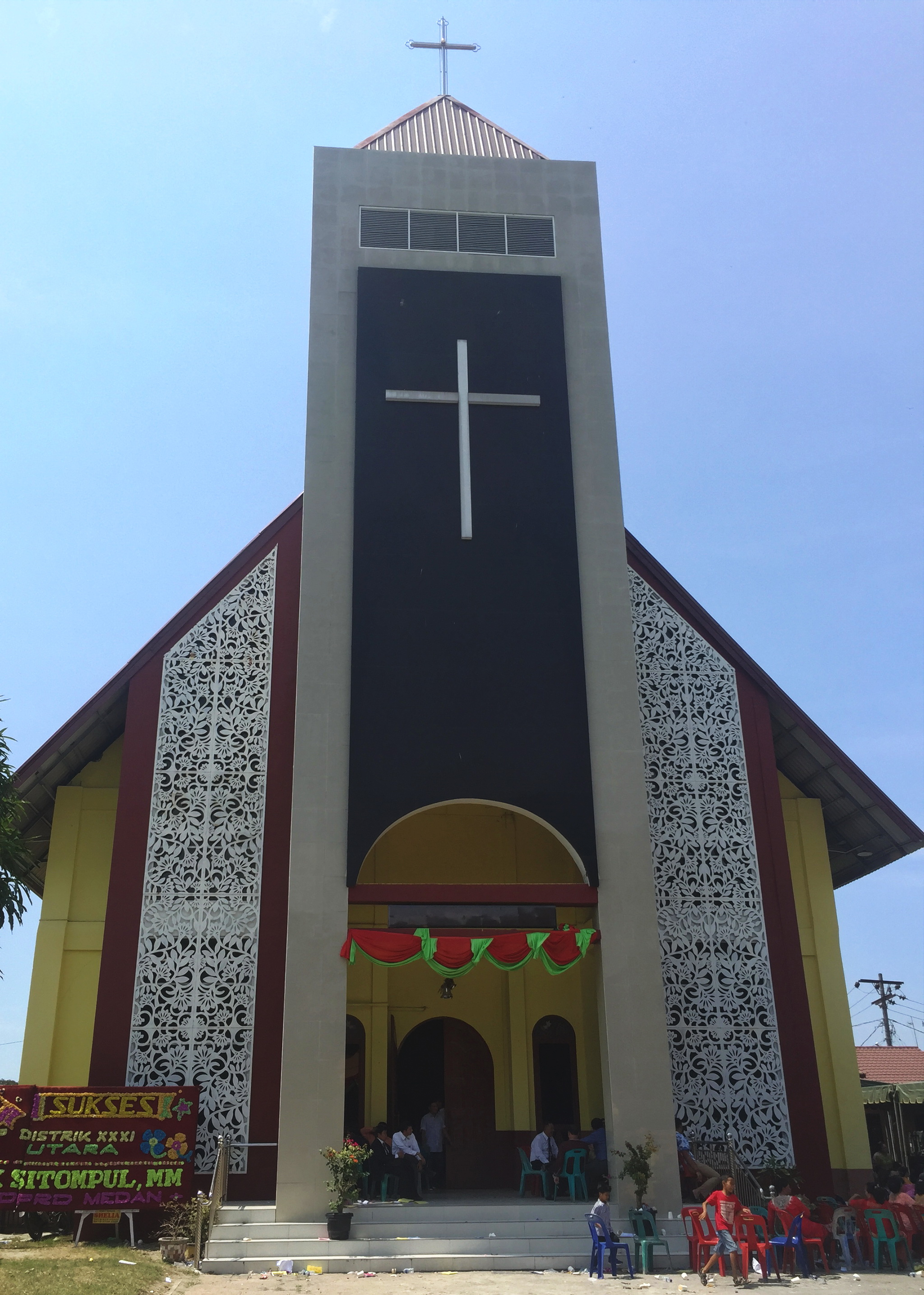
HKBP Church in Martubung, Medan, North Sumatra

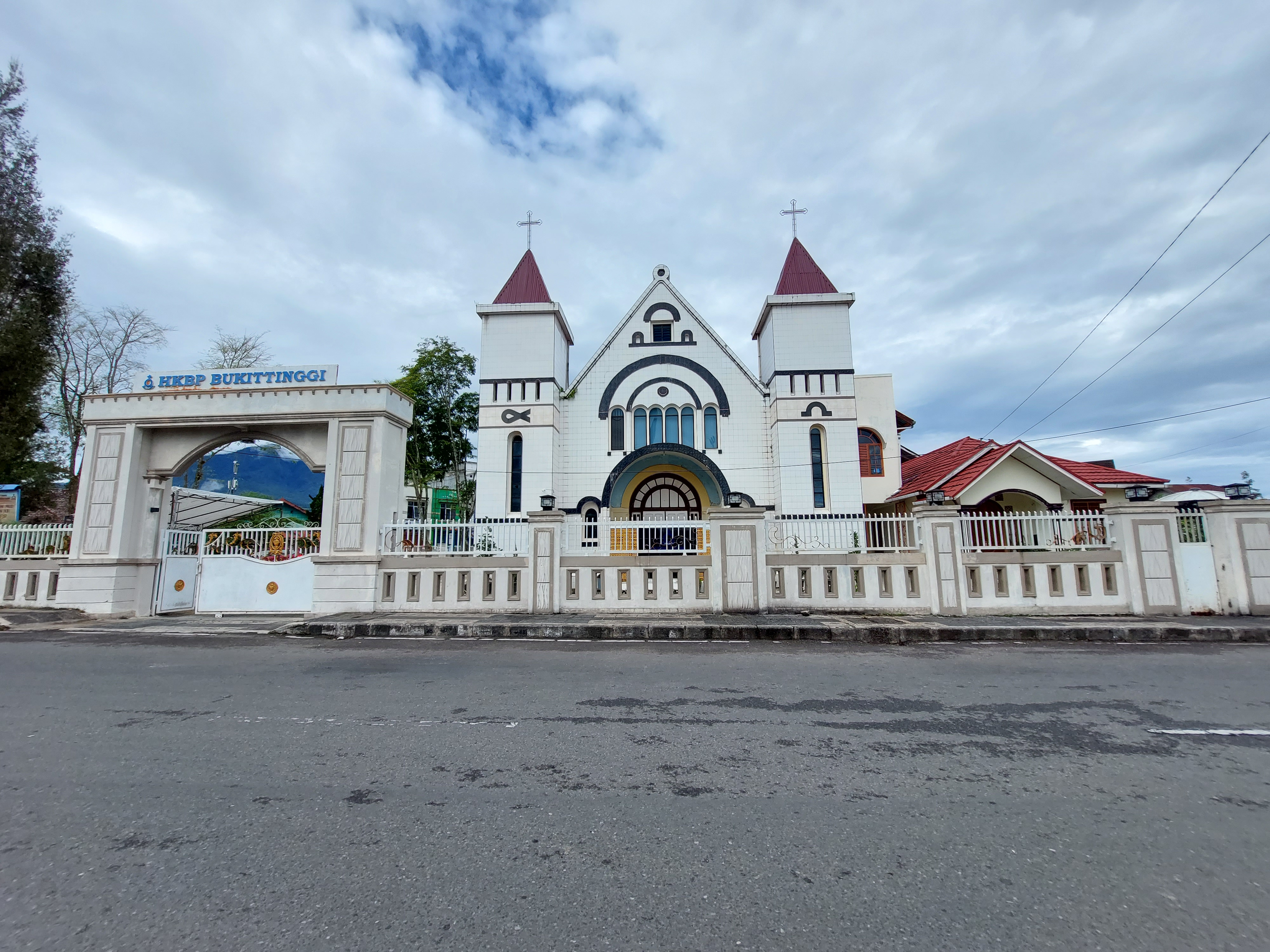
HKBP Church in Bukittinggi, West Sumatra

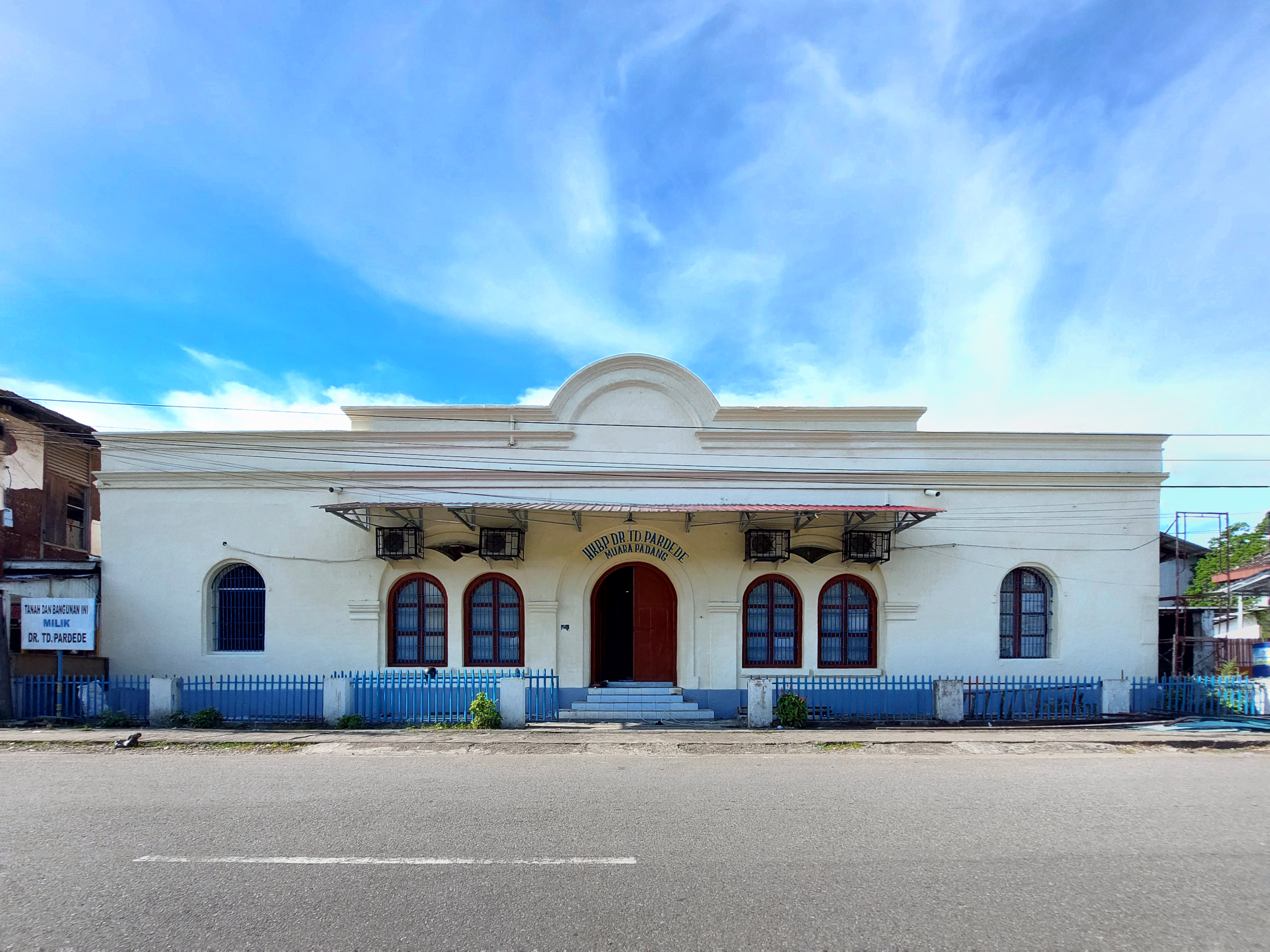
HKBP Church in Padang, West Sumatra

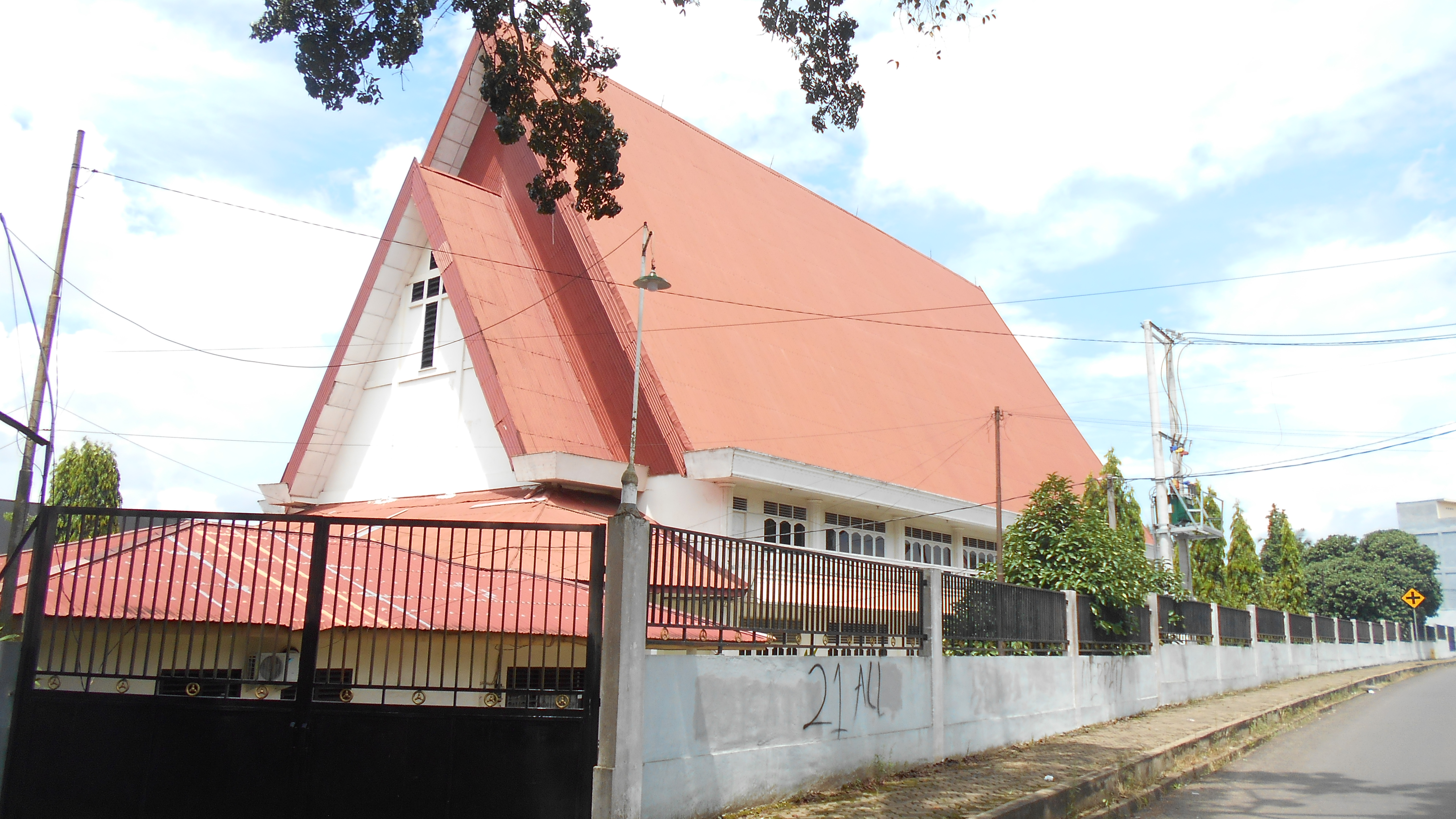
HKBP Church in Jambi, Jambi

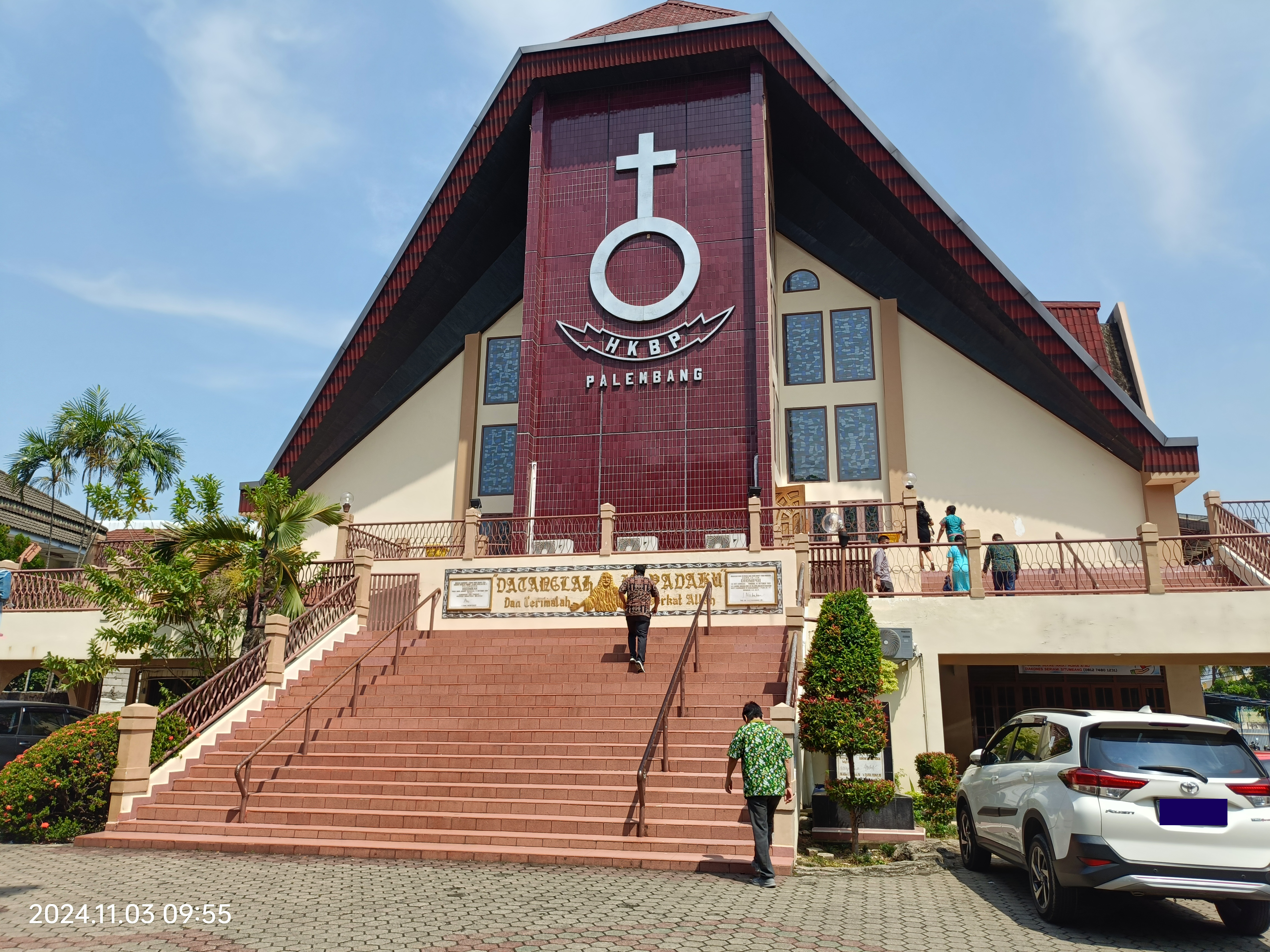
HKBP Church in Palembang, South Sumatra

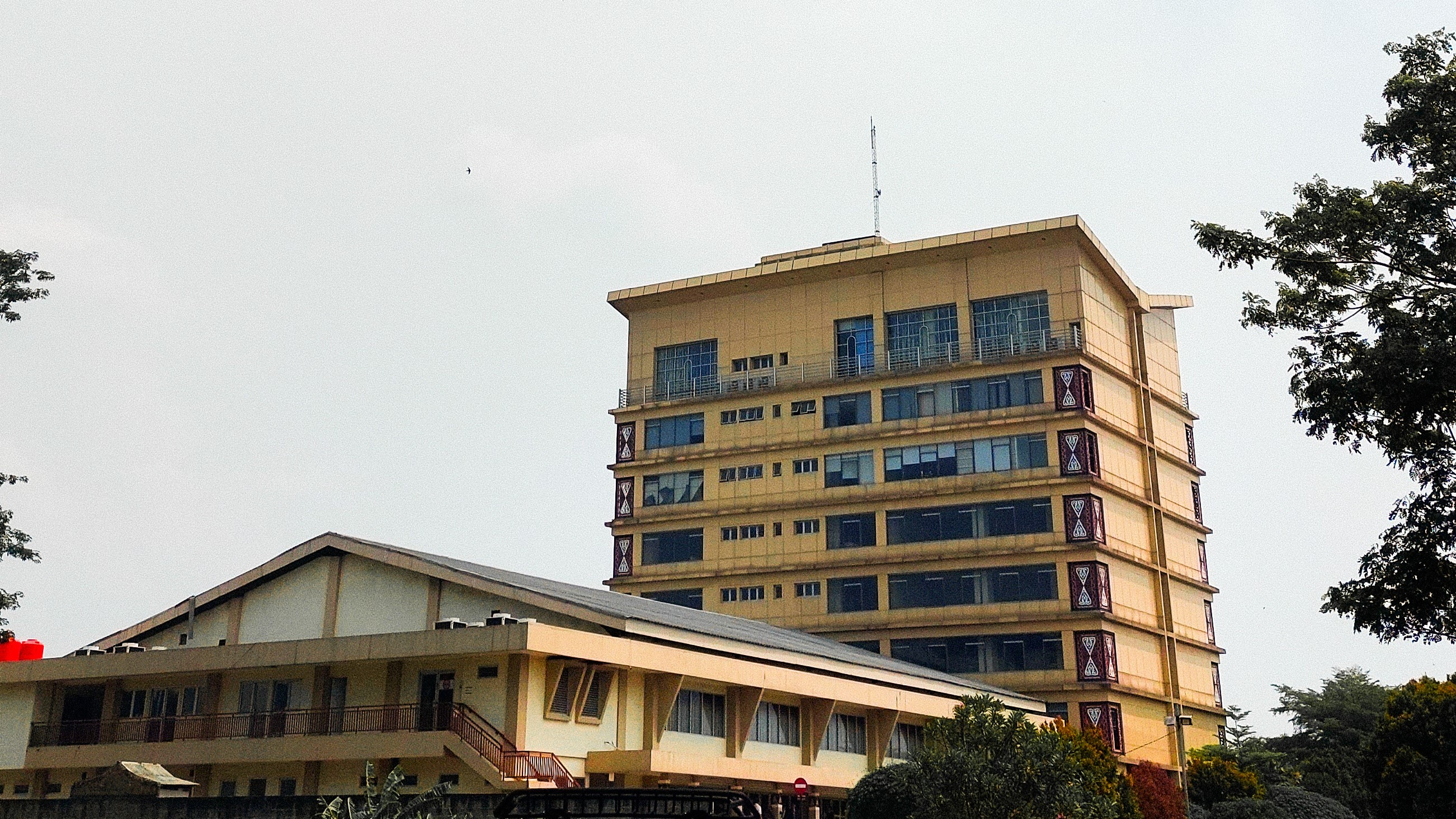
Sopo Marpingkir HKBP, Jakarta, where headquarters of HKBP's District VIII of Jakarta and District XIX of Bekasi are located in

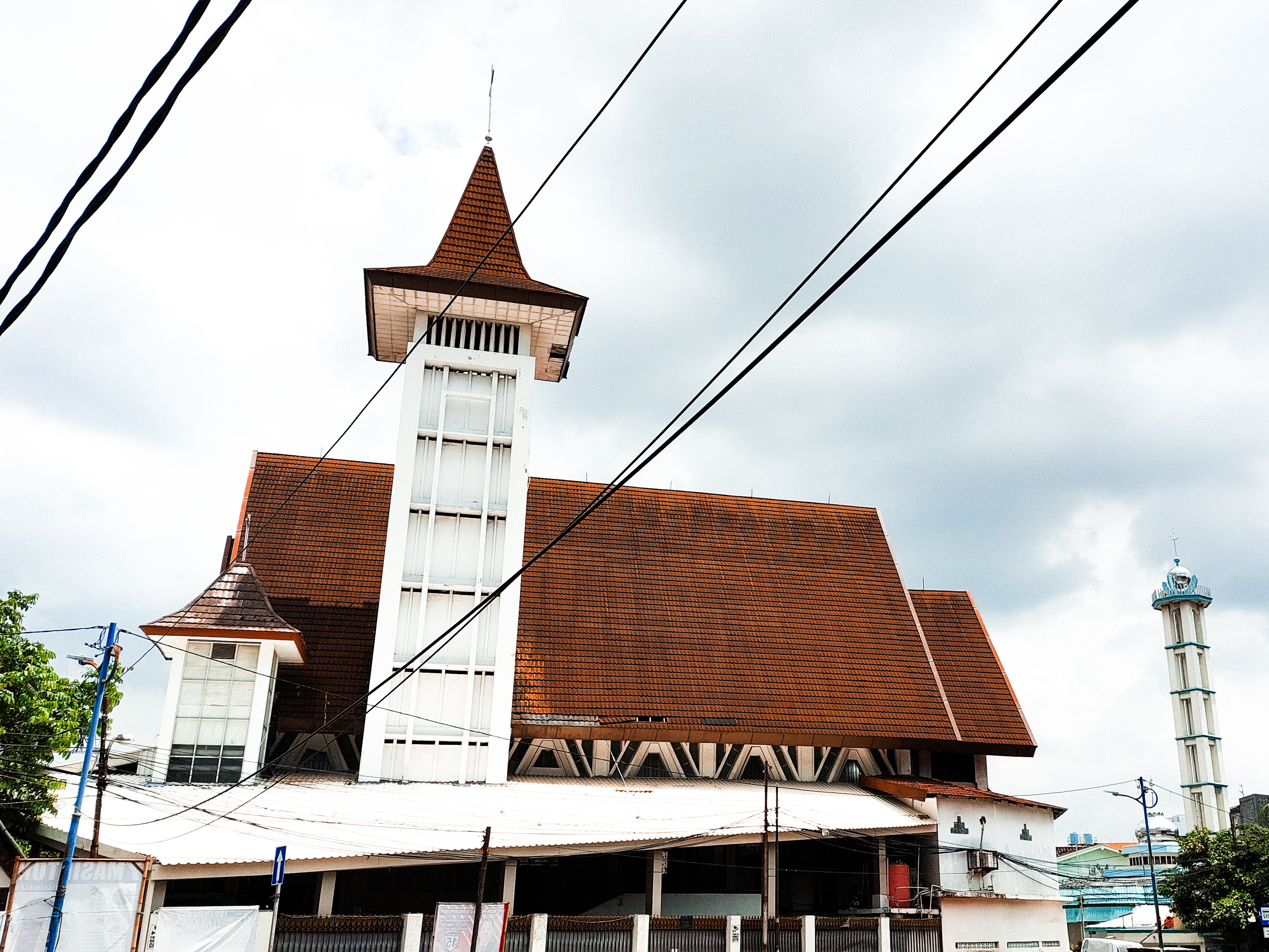
Oldest HKBP Church in Jakarta, founded in 1919

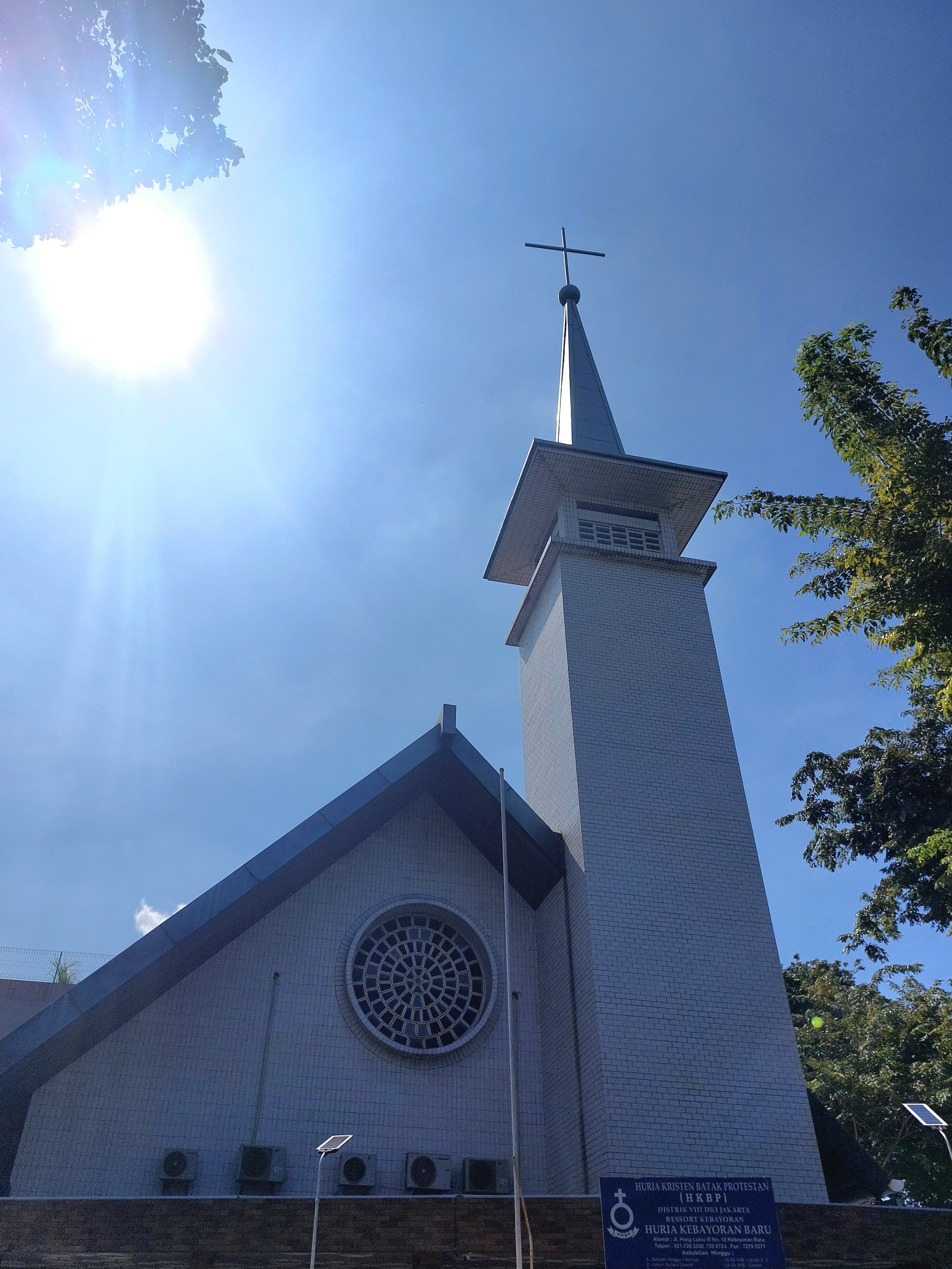
HKBP Church in Kebayoran Baru, Jakarta

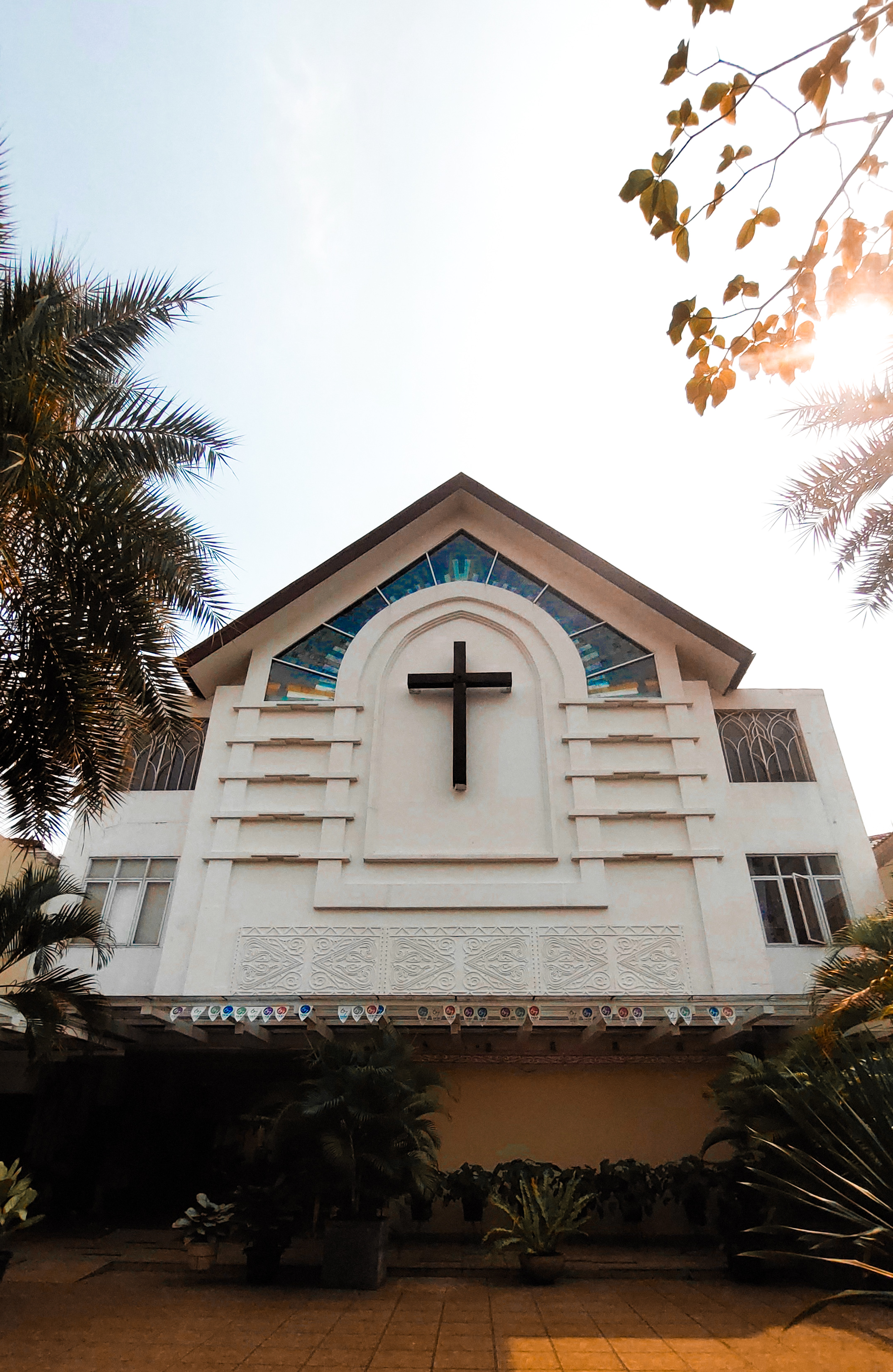
HKBP Church in Menteng, Jakarta

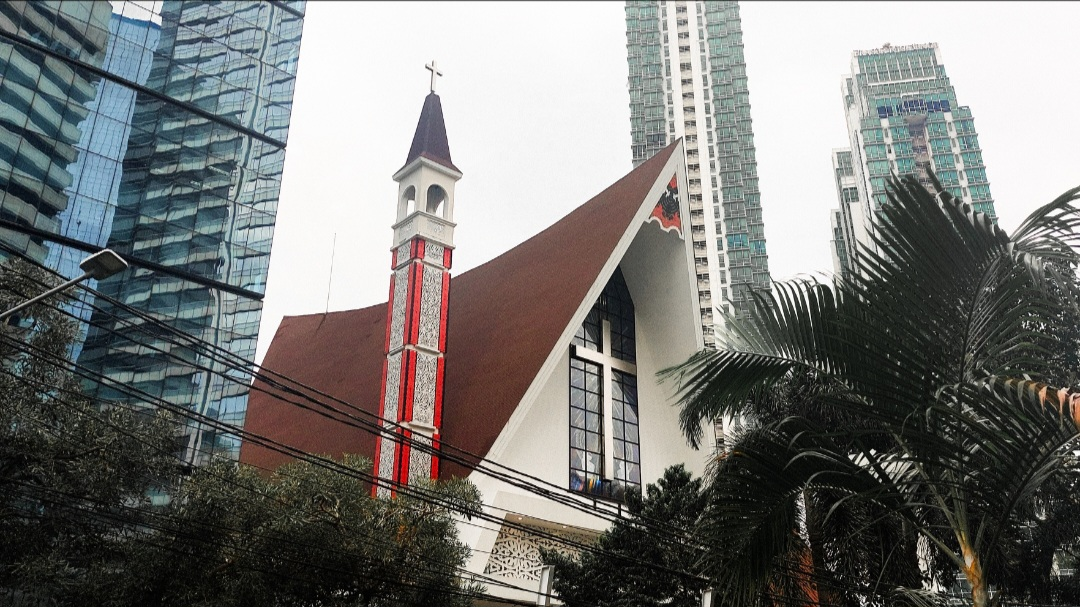
HKBP Church near Sudirman Avenue, Jakarta

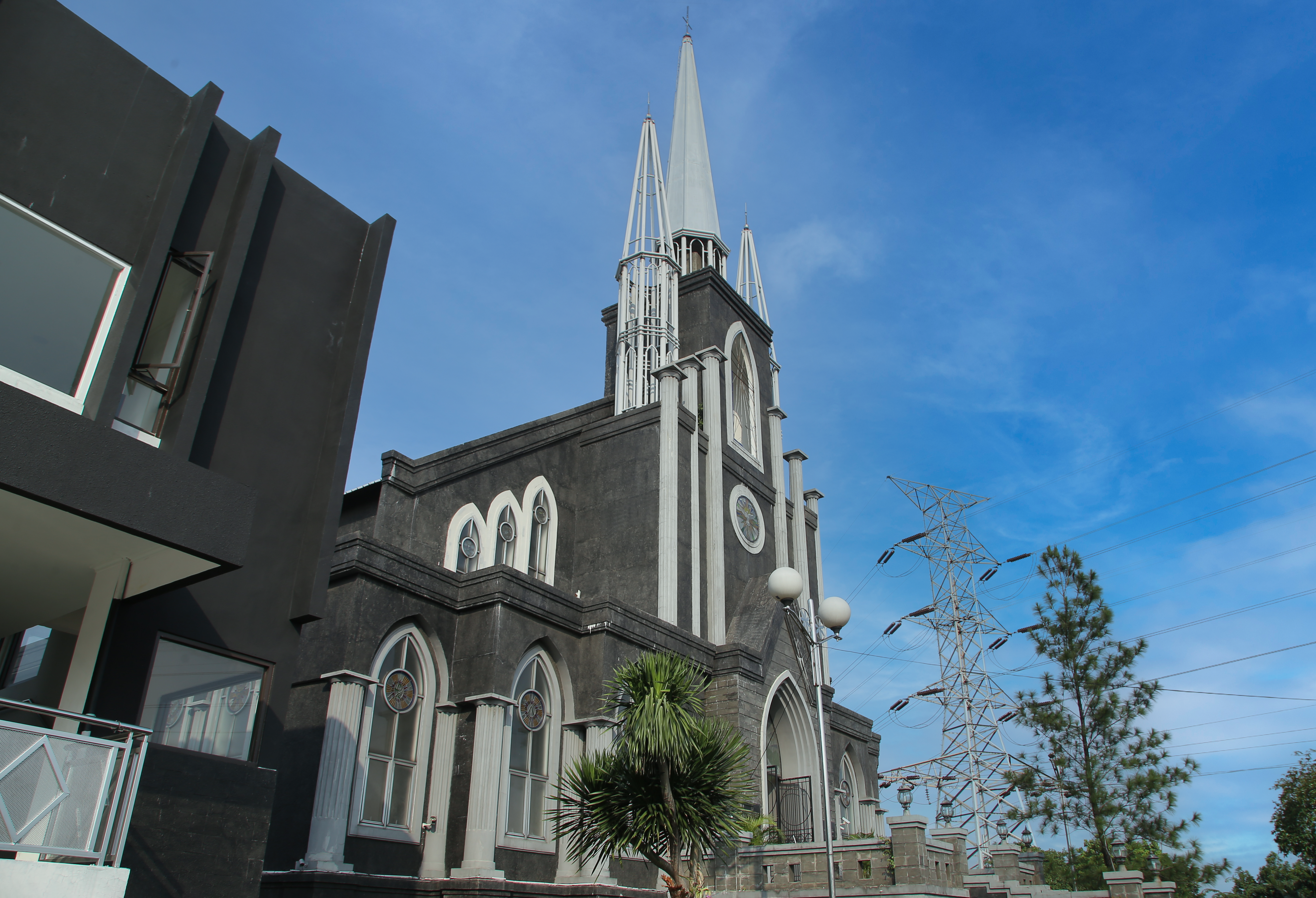
HKBP Church in Pasar Minggu, Jakarta

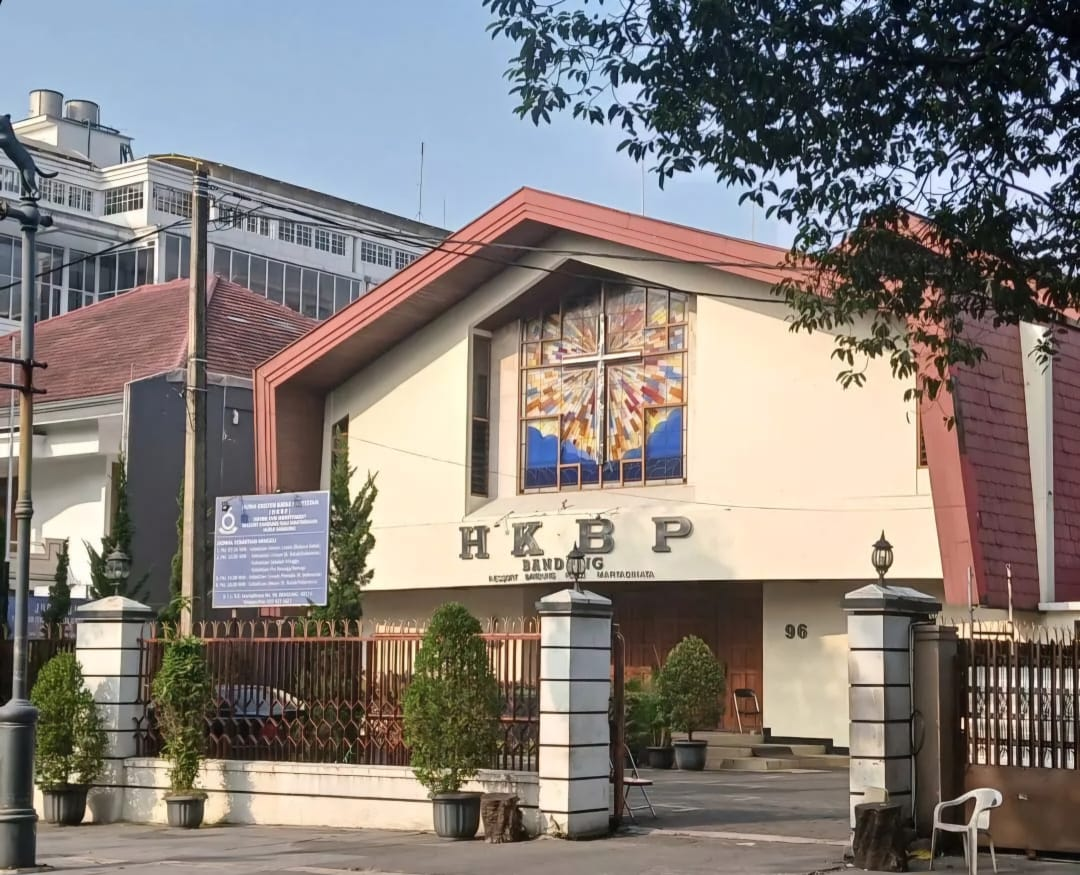
HKBP Church on R.E. Martadinata Street, Bandung, West Java

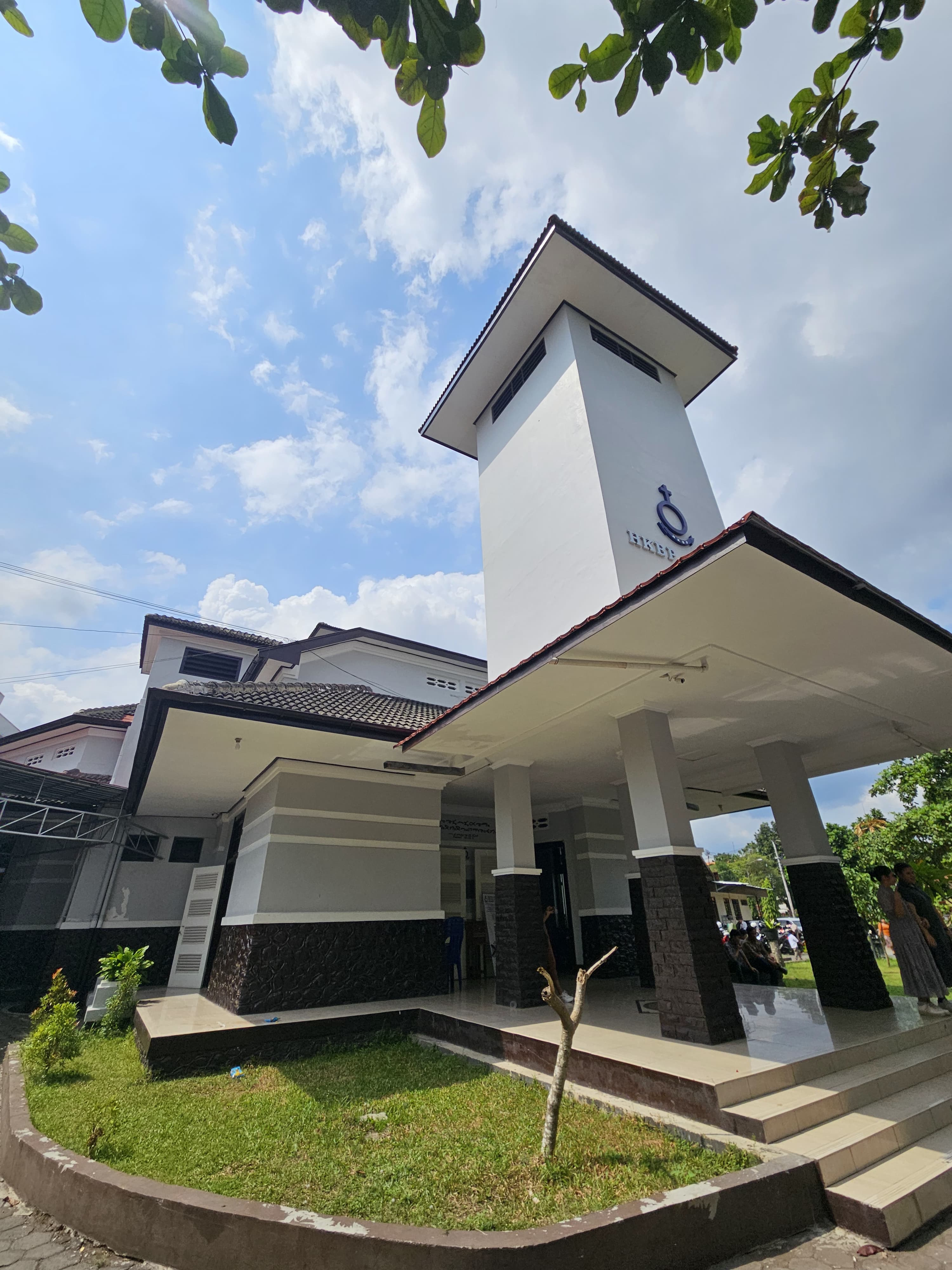
HKBP Church in Yogyakarta

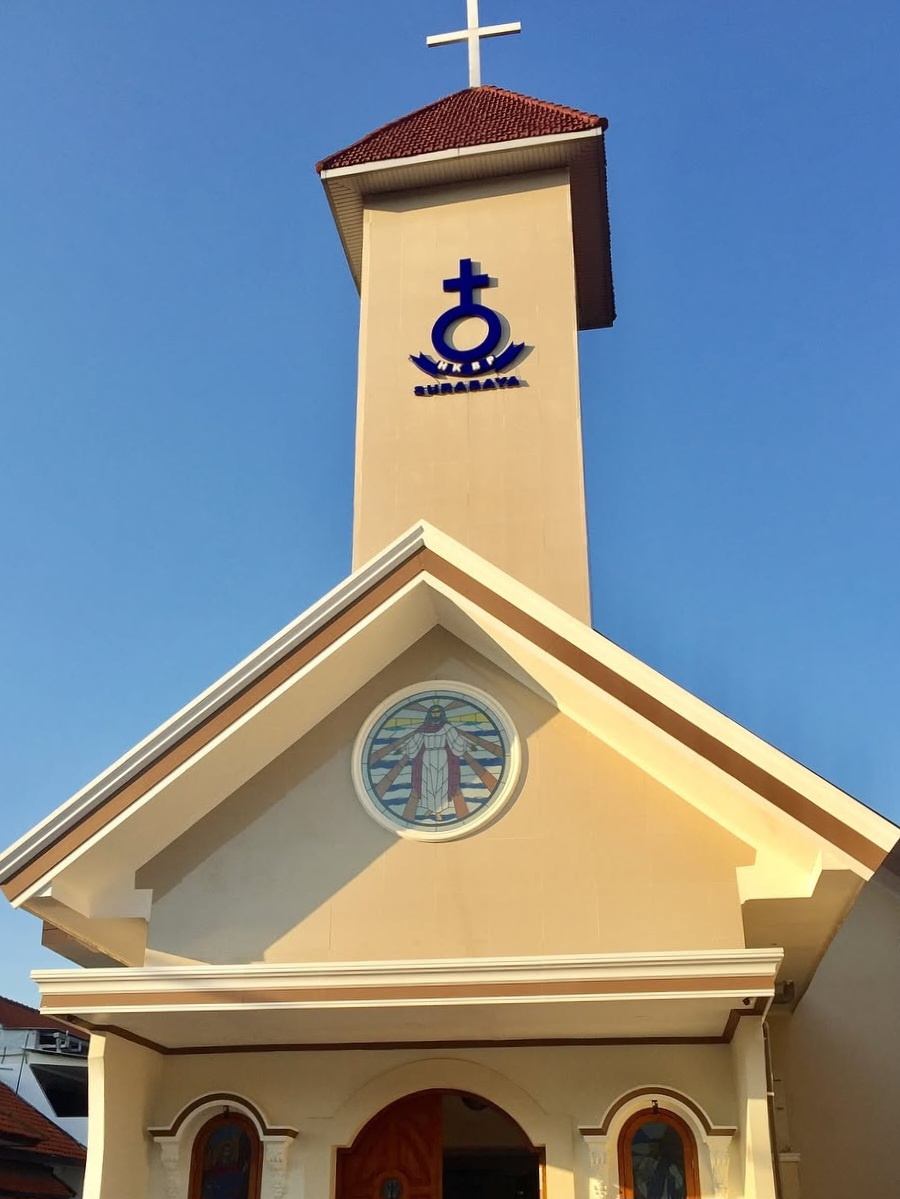
HKBP Church in Surabaya, East Java

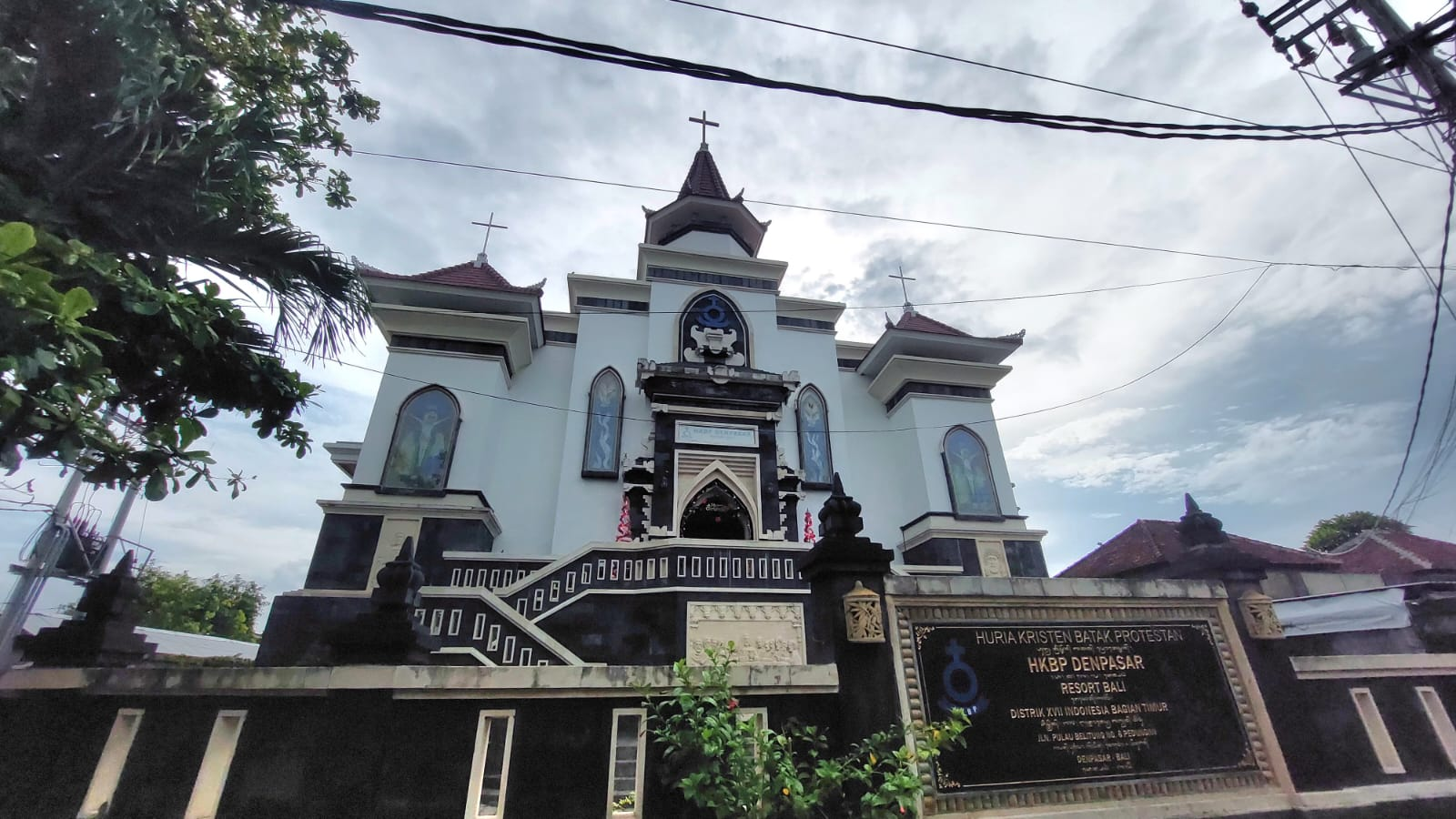
HKBP Church in Denpasar, Bali

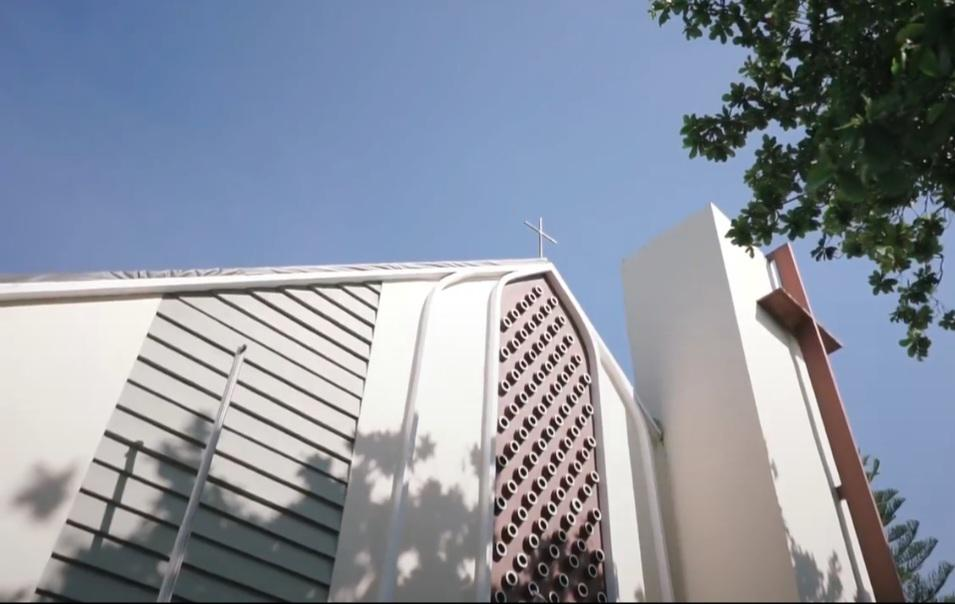
HKBP Church in Makassar, South Sulawesi

== See also ==
- Protestantism in Indonesia
- Buku Ende
- The Indonesian Christian Church (Huria Kristen Indonesia HKI)
