= Ramlan Hutahaean =

Indonesian Christian priest (1955–2021)

Emeritus Ramlan Hutahaean The Right Reverend
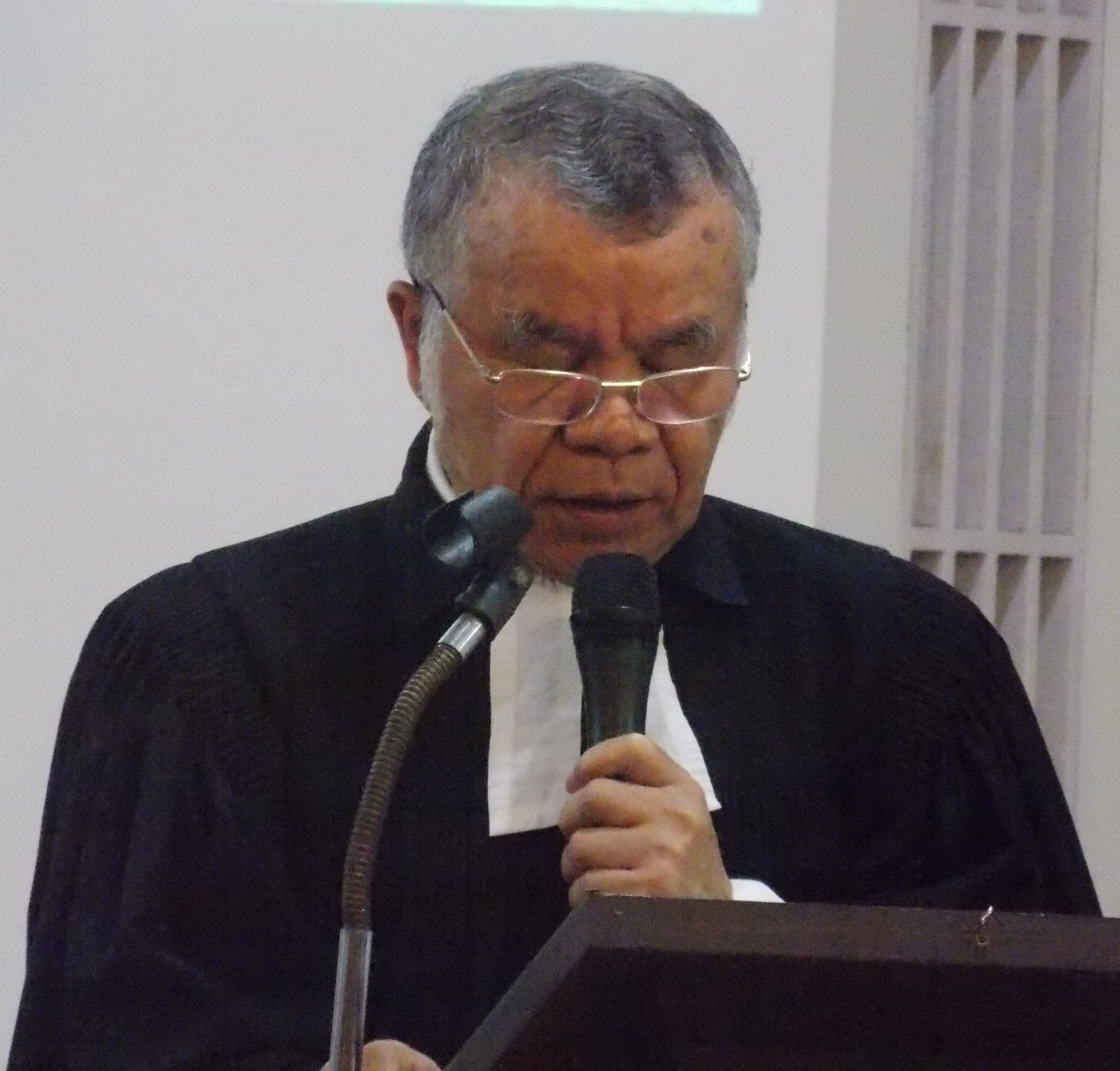
- Church: Batak Christian Protestant Church

Personal details
- Born: 7 September 1955 Sipahutar, North Tapanuli, North Sumatra, Indonesia
- Died: 29 June 2021 (aged 65) Jakarta, Indonesia
- Denomination: Protestantism (Lutheranism)

Ramlan Hutahaean (7 September 1955 – 29 June 2021) was an Indonesian Lutheran minister. He was the 9th General Secretary of the Batak Christian Protestant Church (HKBP) between 2008 and 2012.

== Early life ==
Ramlan was born on 7 September 1955 in Sipahutar, a village located in North Tapanuli in Sumatra, Indonesia.

== Evangelical career ==
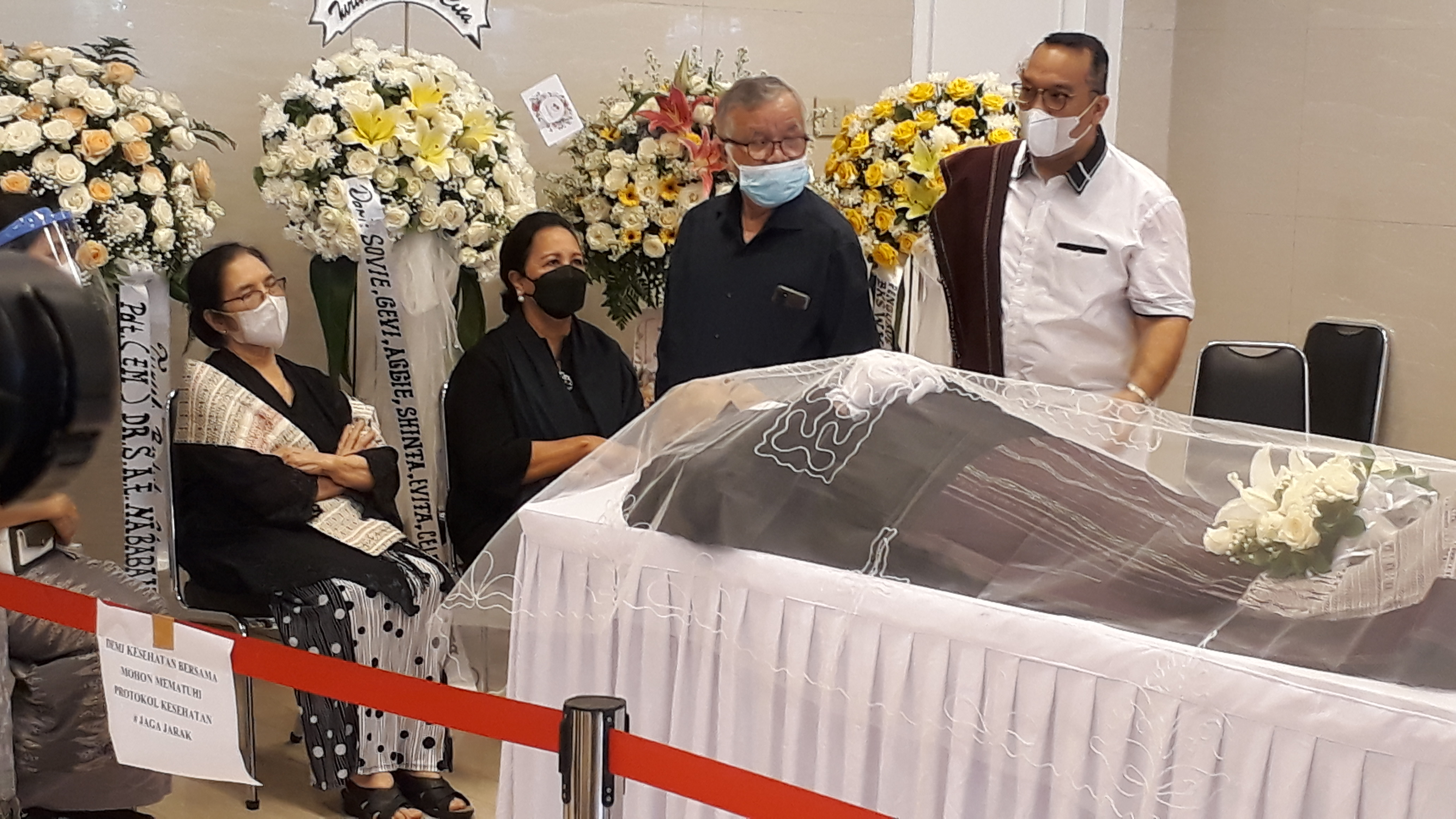
Ramlan Hutahaean observing the body of S. A. E. Nababan

=== Arrest and torture ===
During the New Order regime of Indonesian President Suharto the military had a strong political role. In the mid-1990s the Indonesian government backed P. W. T. Simanjuntak to be the Ephorus (Chairman) of the Batak Christian Protestant Church, against a majority of church members who supported the previous chairman S. A. E. Nababan. The conflict between the government wing, and opposition supporters, involved the military. Ramlan supported the latter and became the head of the church's personnel bureau in S. A. E. Nababan's administration. His support of S. A. E. Nababan resulted in his home in North Tapanuli being raided by around 150 soldiers on 12 May 1994. He was then arrested, tortured, and held at a secret location along with two HKBP ministers and the son of an HKBP minister. Several days later, the police stated that Ramlan was arrested on charges of holding an illegal meeting, but refused to give any clarifications on his torture.

=== General Secretary of HKBP ===
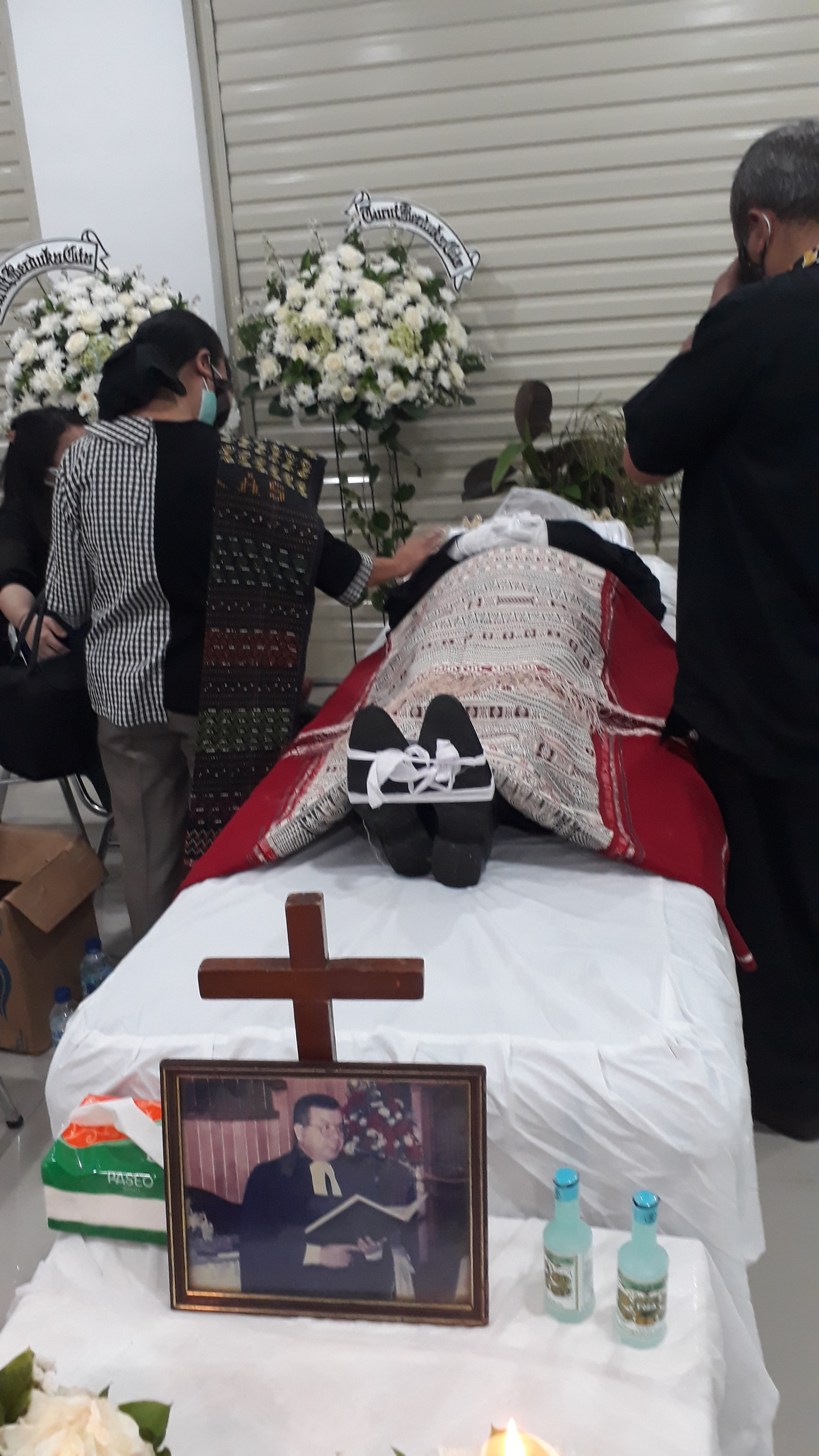
Body of Ramlan Hutahaean being laid at the Indonesia Christian University's funeral home.

Ramlan was elected as the General Secretary of HKBP at its 59th General Synod (Sinode Godang) in September 2008. He defeated five other candidates in the election. After his four-year term as secretary general ended, Ramlan decided to run as a candidate for the church's Ephorus in the next general synod in September 2012. He lost the election to W. T. P. Simarmata. He then attempted to run for a second term as secretary general, but he lost again, this time to Mori Sihombing.

During his tenure as General Secretary, a conflict relating to the establishment of a HKBP church in Ciketing, a subdistrict in Bekasi, occurred. A HKBP pastor from the nearby region was beaten by locals, while a local elder named Hasian Sihombing was stabbed by an unknown group. Ramlan and the Ephorus demanded the President of Indonesia at that time, Susilo Bambang Yudhoyono, resolve the problem. Several days later, Ramlan went to the Ciketing HKBP church—which at that time had been sealed by locals—and led a mass there.

== Death ==
Ramlan died on 29 June 2021 in Jakarta.
