= J.R. Hutauruk =

The Right Reverend Jubil Raplan Hutauruk Ephorus (Emeritus)
- 13th Ephorus of HKBP
- Church: Huria Kristen Batak Protestan
- Installed: 1998
- Term ended: 2004
- Predecessor: S.A.E. Nababan and P.W.T. Simanjuntak
- Successor: Bonar Napitupulu

Personal details
- Born: 7 October 1936 (age 89) Tiga Dolok, Simalungun, Dutch East Indies
- Denomination: Protestant Christianity
- Parents: Jetro Hutauruk
- Spouse: Dumaris Simorangkir

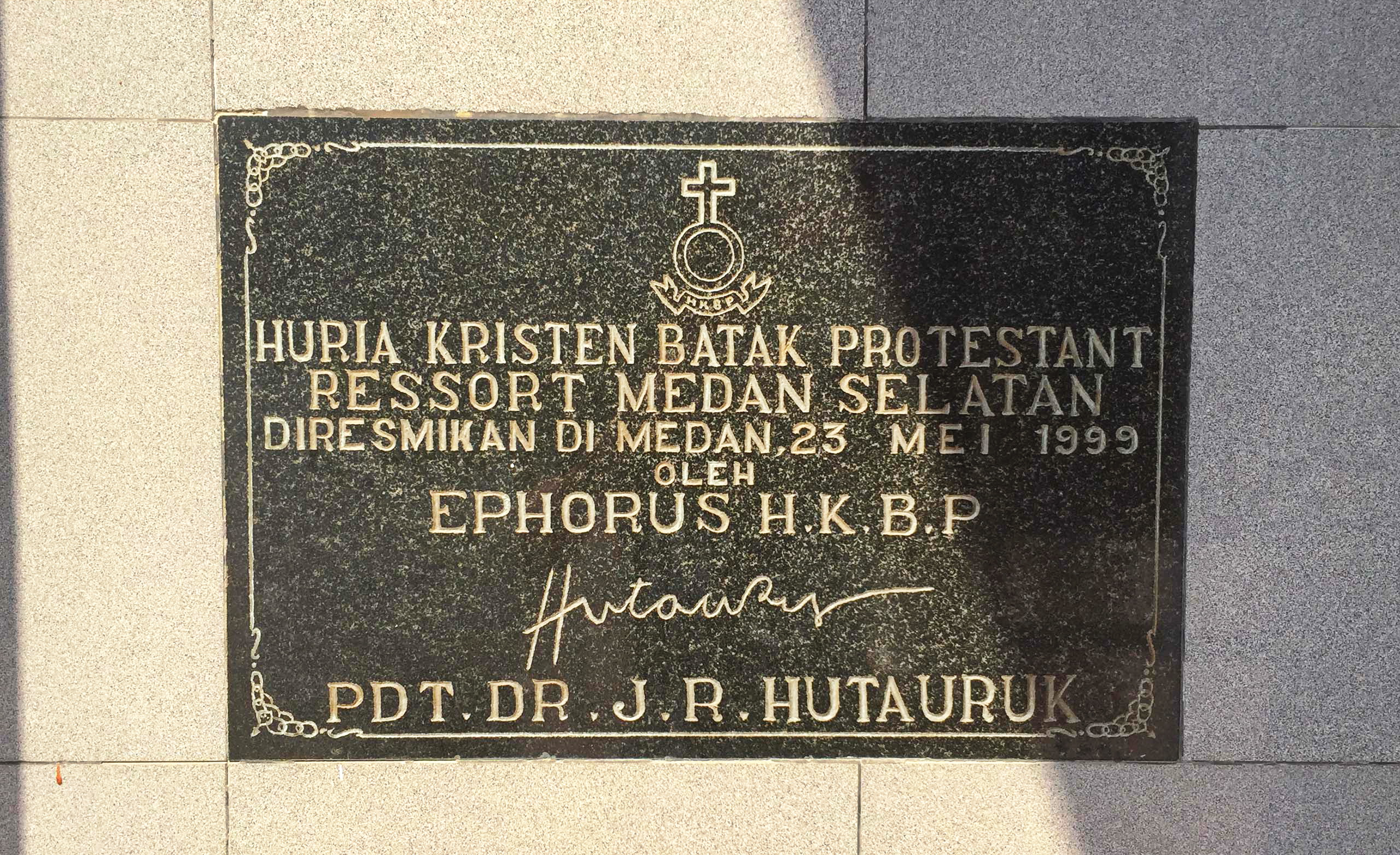
Inscription for J.R. Hutauruk

Jubil Raplan Hutauruk (abbreviated as J.R. Hutauruk) was the 13th Ephorus of the Batak Christian Protestant Church (HKBP). He initially served as Acting Ephorus tasked with reconciliation during the internal conflict, for six months. On 17 November 1998, Ephorus S.A.E. Nababan and Acting Ephorus J.R. Hutauruk signed a joint reconciliation statement at HKBP Sudirman, Medan to hold the Sinode Godang Reconciliation on 18–20 December 1998. During the Synod, J.R. Hutauruk was elected as Ephorus, with W.T.P Simarmata serving as General Secretary.

== Early life and education ==
Jubil Raplan Hutauruk was born on 7 October 1936 in Tigadolok, Simalungun Regency, coinciding with the 75th anniversary of the founding of HKBP. He was the son of Guru Jetro Hutauruk, who at the time served as a pastor at HKBP Tigadolok in the HKBP East Sumatra District.

He completed primary schooling at various locations in Pangaribuan, Pahae, and Sipoholon between 1943 and 1950, and attended Public High School Soposurung in Balige from 1953 to 1956. He then studied theology at the Faculty of Theology, Nommensen HKBP University, earning his Bachelor of Theology in 1961 after earlier receiving theological training at Seminarium Sipoholon. Among his contemporaries were P. W. T. Simanjuntak (Ephorus 1992–1998) and S.M. Siahaan (Secretary General of HKBP 1992–1998).

After completing his undergraduate studies, Hutauruk pursued further theological education in Germany. He earned a Master of Theology from the University of Hamburg in 1968. He later returned to Hamburg for doctoral studies and completed his Doctor of Theology in 1979 with a dissertation on the development of the Batak Church prior to its independence, titled Die Batakkirche vor ihrer Unabhängigkeit (1899 - 1942): Probleme der kirchlichen Unabhängigkeit angesichts der Problematik von Mission, Kolonialismus und Nationalismus.

== Career ==
Hutauruk began his early ministry as a vicar at HKBP Ressort Sibolga I in 1961–1962 and was ordained as pastor on 11 November 1962 by Ephorus T.S. Sihombing. He then served as an assistant lecturer at the Faculty of Theology, Nommensen HKBP University from 1962 to 1963.

After returning from Germany in 1968, Hutauruk became a lecturer at Seminarium Sipoholon (1969–1973) and also taught at the HKBP Diaconess School in Balige. From 1970 to 1973 he served as Director of the Seminarium.

Following this, Hutauruk worked in the Archives Department of the HKBP Headquarters in Pearaja, Tarutung, before joining Pematangsiantar Theological School in 1980. At Pematangsiantar Theological School , he served as lecturer, Vice Rector, and held various academic leadership roles for 17 years (1980–1997), making it the longest period of his ministry at a single institution.

At the 1993 Sinode Godang Istimewa in Medan, Hutauruk was elected Chair of the HKBP Pastors' Assembly while continuing his academic duties. He later served as pastor of HKBP Tebet, Jakarta (1997–1998/1999).

In October 1998, Hutauruk was appointed Acting Ephorus to lead HKBP during a period of internal conflict and dual leadership that had persisted since 1992. His mandate was to prepare and oversee a Sinode Godang to establish definitive leadership for the church. Within four months, a Sinode Godang was successfully convened in Pematangsiantar from 18–20 December 1998, after which he was elected the 12th Ephorus of HKBP for the 1998–2004 term.

Hutauruk's leadership is characterized as a period of reconciliation, during which HKBP focused on restoring unity from the congregational level up to the central offices. Under his tenure, HKBP also enacted the 2002 Church Order, which introduced an amendment-based system for revising internal regulations.

Hutauruk was also active in ecumenical bodies at national and international levels, serving as a member of the Lutheran World Federation Council and its Commission for Study and Theology (2003–2020), as well as the Advisory Council of the Communion of Churches in Indonesia from 2005 to 2010.

== Personal life ==
J.R. Hutauruk married Dumaris Simorangkir, and the couple has five children. One of their children, Sadrak Sabam, followed him into ministry and serves as a pastor at HKBP Medan.
