= Bonar Napitupulu =

Indonesian pastor (born 1949)

The Right Reverend Bonar Napitupulu Ephorus (Emeritus)
- 14th Ephorus of HKBP
- Church: Huria Kristen Batak Protestan
- Installed: 2004
- Term ended: 2012
- Predecessor: J.R. Hutauruk
- Successor: W.T.P. Simarmata

Personal details
- Born: 15 February 1949 (age 77) Balige, North Tapanuli Regency, North Sumatra
- Denomination: Lutheranism
- Spouse: Tarapul Shinta Ria Sitanggang

Bonar Napitupulu (born 15 February 1949) is an Indonesian pastor of the Huria Kristen Batak Protestan (HKBP) who served as the 14th Ephorus the Batak Christian Protestant Church (HKBP). He was elected at the Sinode Godang (Note: The Sinode Godang is the General Synod (forum) of the Huria Kristen Batak Protestant (HKBP) church at which key leaders, including the Ephorus, are elected.) for two consecutive terms (Note: Euphora are elected for four year terms.) serving from 2004 to 2008 and from 2008 to 2012.

== Early life and education ==
Bonar Napitupulu was born in Balige on 15 February 1949. He completed his Bachelor of Theology from the Faculty of Theology, Nommensen HKBP University, in 1972. He later earned a Master of Theology from the South East Asia Graduate School of Theology in 1983, followed by a Doctor of Theology from the same institution in 1993.

== Career ==
Napitupulu began his ministry as a vicar at HKBP Sidorame in 1973. After being ordained, he served in several HKBP congregations in Jakarta, including HKBP Resort Tanah Tinggi (1979–1981) and HKBP Pondok Bambu (1981–1989). He later served as pastor at HKBP Resort Sutoyo Jakarta (1993–1998), HKBP Resort Medan I (1998–1999), and HKBP Resort Medan (1999–2004).

=== Ephorus of HKBP ===
In the 2004 Sinode Godang, Napitupulu was elected the 13th Ephorus of the Batak Christian Protestant Church (HKBP), succeeding J.R. Hutauruk. He served his first term from 2004 to 2008. He was re-elected for a second term (2008–2012) during the 59th Sinode Godang held at Seminarium Sipoholon, Tarutung.

== Personal life ==
Napitupulu is married to Tarapul Shinta Ria Sitanggang.
