= 2024 North Tapanuli regency election =

Local election in Indonesia

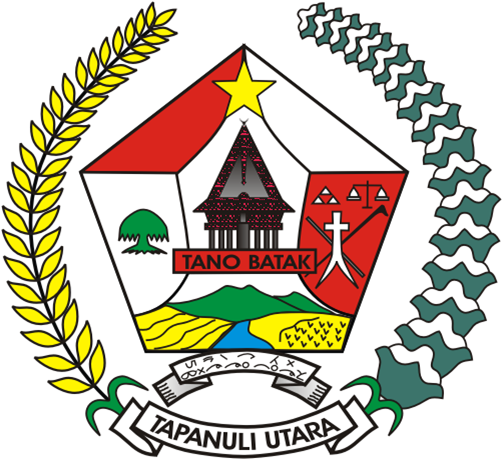
- 27 November 2024
- Turnout: 73.5%
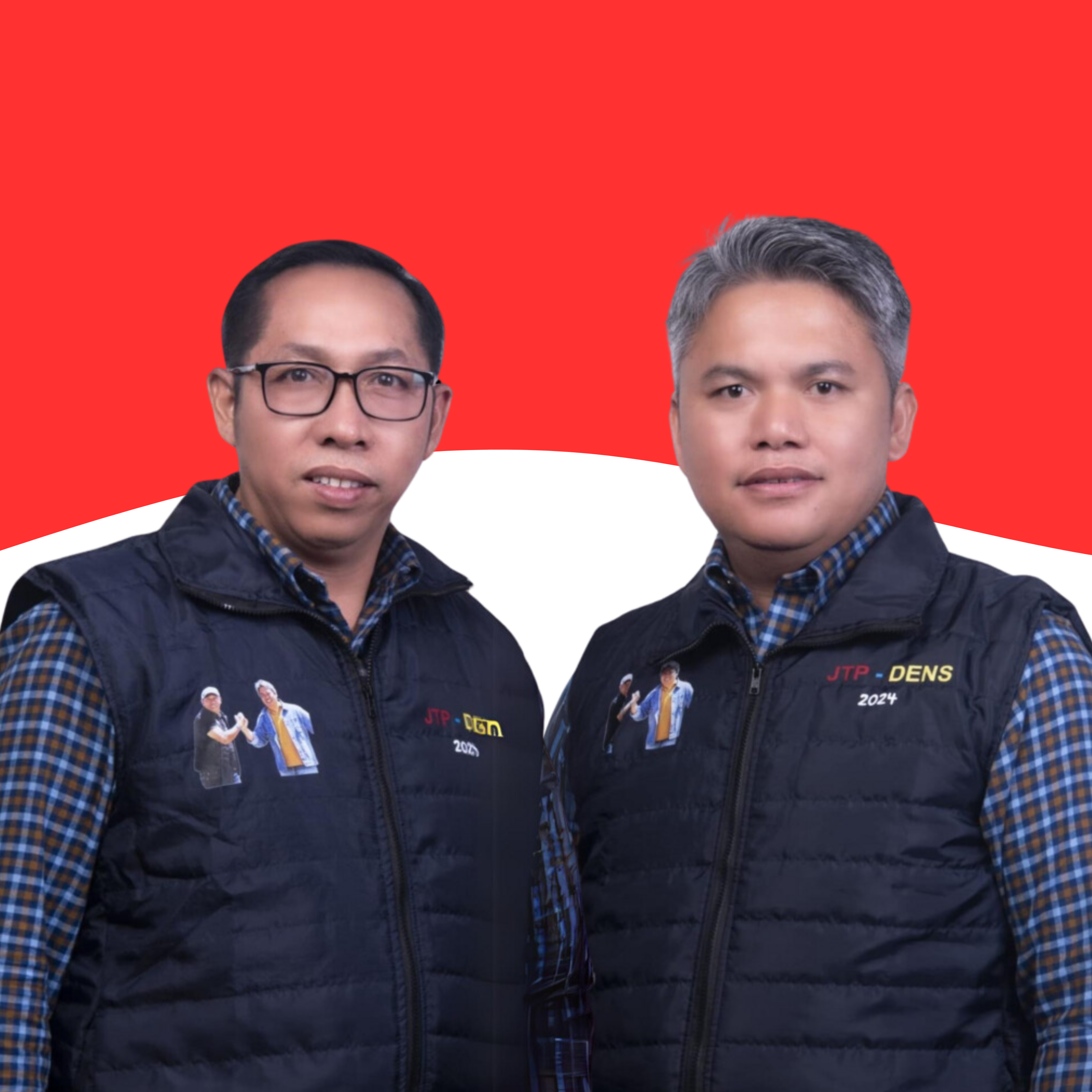

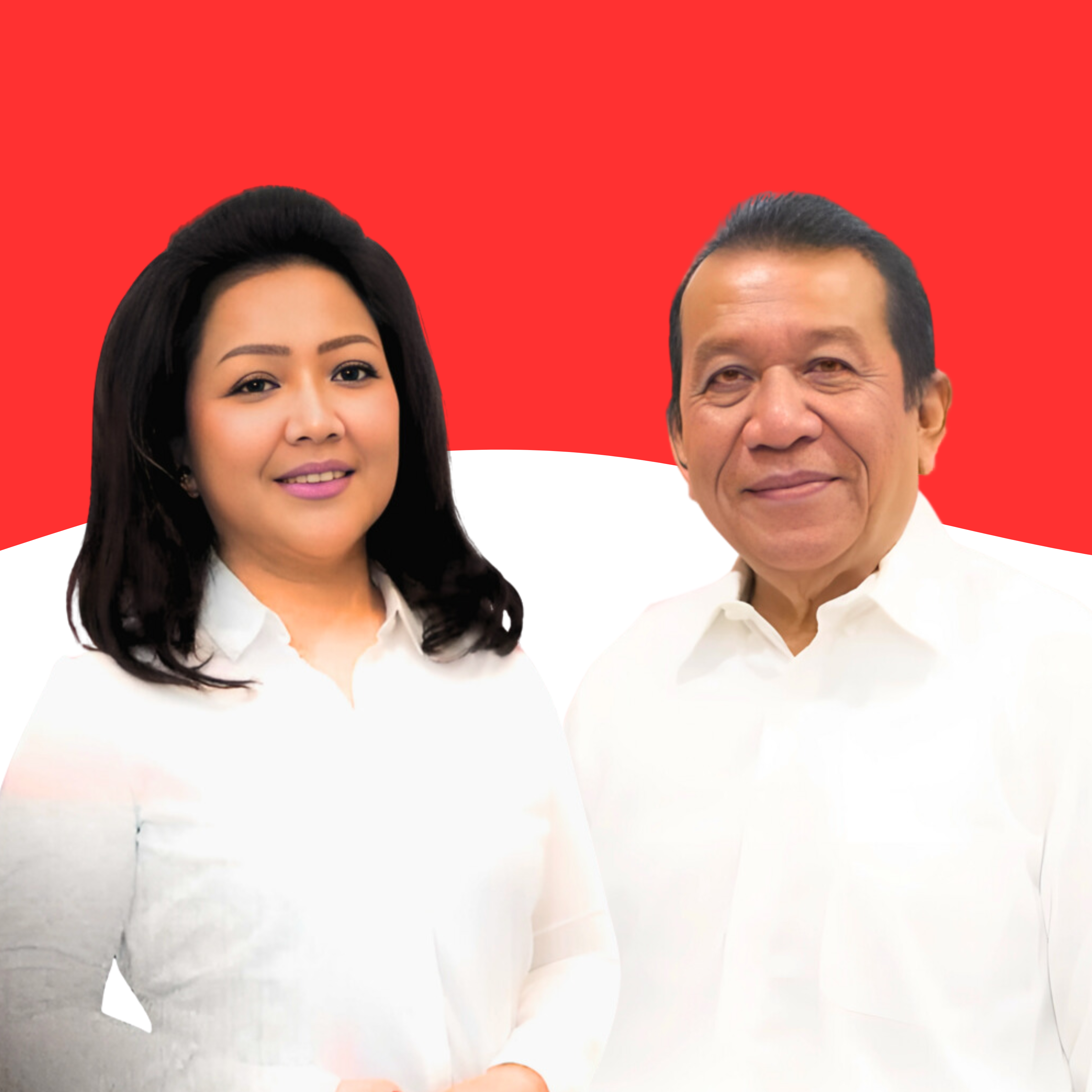
| Candidate | Jonius Taripar Hutabarat | Satika Simamora |
| Party | Perindo | PDI-P |
| Running mate | Deni Lumbantoruan | Sarlandi Hutabarat |
| Popular vote | 105,505 | 58,634 |
| Percentage | 64.47% | 35.53% |
Regent before election
Dimposma Sihombing (acting)
Independent
Elected Regent
Jonius Taripar Hutabarat
Perindo

The 2024 North Tapanuli regency election was held on 27 November 2024 as part of nationwide local elections to elect the regent of North Tapanuli Regency, North Sumatra for a five-year term. Perindo candidate Jonius Taripar Parsaoran Hutabarat, formerly a member of the North Sumatra Regional House of Representatives, defeated PDI-P candidate and wife of previous regent Satika Simamora in the election.

== Electoral system ==
The election, like other local elections in 2024, follow the first-past-the-post system where the candidate with the most votes wins the election, even if they do not win a majority. It is possible for a candidate to run uncontested, in which case the candidate is still required to win a majority of votes "against" an "empty box" option. Should the candidate fail to do so, the election will be repeated on a later date.

The size of the electorate was initially announced as 227,118 eligible voters, later revised to 226,579.

== Candidates ==
The previous regent, Nikson Nababan, had served for two full terms in 2014–2024 and was ineligible to run in the election.

=== Jonius–Deni ===
Jonius Taripar Parsaoran Hutabarat, a member of the provincial North Sumatra Regional House of Representatives from Perindo Party, registered at his party to run as regent in North Tapanuli on 15 May 2024. As his running mate, Perindo approved Deni Parlindungan Lumbantoruan, an engineering lecturer at a local private university described as a confidant to former Coordinating Minister for Maritime and Investment Affairs Luhut Binsar Pandjaitan. According to Lumbantoruan, him and Jonius had been engaged in discussions about their joint bid since 2022. By the time of their registration on 29 August 2024, the ticket had received further endorsements from six other parties: Nasdem, Golkar, Hanura, Demokrat, Gerindra, and PSI.

=== Satika–Sarlandi ===
In August 2024, the Indonesian Democratic Party of Struggle and the National Awakening Party officially endorsed Satika Simamora, wife of previous two-term regent of North Tapanuli Nikson Nababan, to run as regent. As her running mate was Sarlandy Hutabarat, former vice regent of Nikson Nababan between 2019 and 2024.

== Results ==
| Candidate | Running mate | Candidate party | Votes | % |
|---|---|---|---|---|
| Jonius Taripar Parsaoran Hutabarat | Deni Lumbantoruan | Perindo | 105,505 | 64.28 |
| Satika Simamora | Sarlandi Hutabarat | PDI-P | 58,634 | 35.72 |
| Total | | | 164,139 | 100.00 |
| Valid votes | | | 164,139 | 98.61 |
| Invalid/blank votes | | | 2,321 | 1.39 |
| Total votes | | | 166,460 | 100.00 |
| Registered voters/turnout | | | 226,579 | 73.47 |

== Aftermath ==
Following the announcement of the election result, the Satika–Sarlandi campaign team filed a suit at the Constitutional Court of Indonesia (MK) to overturn the election results, claiming that regency officials were not neutral in the election. MK rejected the lawsuit on 4 February 2025 citing a lack of evidence. Jonius and Deni were sworn in as regent and vice regent on 20 February 2025.
