= Political Christianity =

Political Christianity may refer to:

- Christianity
- Christianity and politics
- Christian right
