= Sihombing =

Batak surname originating in Indonesia

Sihombing is a Toba Batak clan or family name (marga) originating in Humbang Hasundutan Regency, North Sumatra, Indonesia.

Notable people with the family name include:

- Ben Sihombing (born 1995), Indonesian singer
- Dimposma Sihombing (born 1978), Indonesian bureaucrat
- Calvin Jeremy Sihombing (born 1991), Indonesian singer-songwriter
- Kaleb J Sihombing (born 2000), Indonesian singer-songwriter
- Mangasi Sihombing (born 1947), Indonesian diplomat
- Petra Sihombing (born 1992), Indonesian musician and producer
- Vionita Sihombing (born 1999), Indonesian singer
- Wahyu Sihombing (1932–1989), Indonesian actor and film director
