= UHN =

UHN or Uhn can refer to:

- University Health Network, a public research and teaching hospital network in Toronto, Ontario, Canada
- HKBP Nommensen University abbreviated UHN, a campusses located in North Sumatra, Indonesia
- Uhn, the symbol for the chemical element Unhexnilium
