= Victor Tinambunan =

The Right Reverend Victor Tinambunan Ephorus
- 18th Ephorus of HKBP
- Church: Huria Kristen Batak Protestan
- Elected: 5 December 2024
- Installed: 8 December 2024; 20 months ago
- Predecessor: Robinson Butarbutar

Personal details
- Born: 18 November 1964 (age 61) Parlilitan, Humbang Hasundutan Regency, North Sumatra, Indonesia
- Denomination: Protestantism (Lutheranism)
- Parents: Tangsiun Tinambunan (father); Nursia Sihotang (mother)
- Spouse: Tima Warni Pangaribuan
- Children: 2

Victor Tinambunan (born 18 November 1964) is an Indonesian Protestant priest and the current Ephorus (leader) of the Batak Christian Protestant Church (HKBP).

== Early life and education ==
Victor Tinambunan was born on 18 November 1964 in Siringoringo, Parlilitan, Humbang Hasundutan, North Sumatra, into a Batak Christian family, the son of a church elder and civil servant and one of eight children.

He received his early education at the public primary school in Siringoringo and later attended the public junior high school in Parlilitan. He continued his studies at the HKBP private high school in Tarutung. In 1984, he entered Pematangsiantar Theological School, where he earned a Bachelor of Theology in 1989.

Tinambunan later completed a Master of Theology at Duta Wacana Christian University in Yogyakarta (1994–1996), a Master of Sacred Theology at Lutheran Theological Seminary at Philadelphia (1996–1998), and a Doctor of Theology at Trinity Theological College, Singapore (2006–2010).

== Career ==
After completing his first degree, Tinambunan served as a practical pastor in the HKBP Commission for Rules and Regulations and at HKBP Resort Sei Agul in Medan. He was ordained as a priest on 26 December 1991 by S. A. E. Nababan, a former Ephorus of HKBP, and then served as pastor of HKBP Resort Sihorbo in the Sibolga District from 1991 to 1994. He later combined pastoral duties with academic work, serving as a part time lecturer at Christian University of Indonesia in Jakarta and as a lecturer at Pematangsiantar Theological School and Sundermann Theological School in Nias, where he also headed the theology department.

Within HKBP he has held several high-level positions, including chair of the HKBP Liturgy Commission (2012–2016) and General Secretary (2020–2024).

=== Ephorus of HKBP ===
On 5 December 2024, Tinambunan was elected as Ephorus of HKBP for the 2024–2028 term during the HKBP's 67th Sinode Godang. He was officially installed on 8 December 2024 at the HKBP Pearaja Tarutung Church by senior synod member Rev. Daminna Lumbansiantar. After his installation, he inaugurated the Secretary General, three Heads of department, 32 Praeses, and 70 members of the Synod Workers' Assembly.

== Personal life ==
Tinambunan is married to Tima Warni Pangaribuan, and the couple have two children.
