= Jonius Taripar Parsaoran Hutabarat =

Indonesian politician

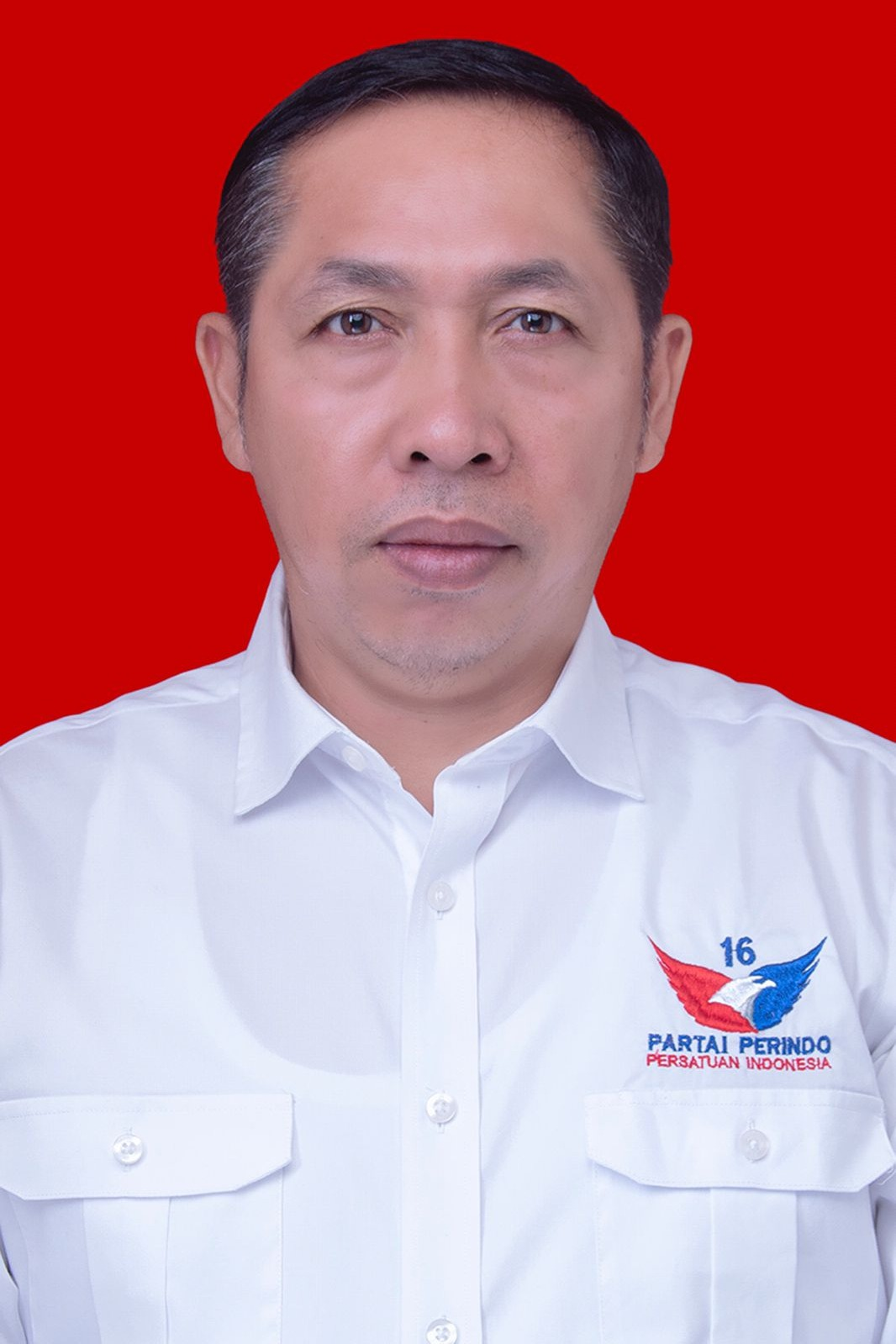
- Hutabarat as a legislative candidate, 2024

Regent of North Tapanuli
- Incumbent
- Assumed office 20 February 2025
- Preceded by: Nikson Nababan

Member of North Sumatra Regional House of Representatives
- In office 16 September 2019 – 16 September 2024

Personal details
- Born: 26 February 1975 (age 51) North Tapanuli, North Sumatra, Indonesia
- Party: Perindo Party

Jonius Taripar Parsaoran Hutabarat (born 26 February 1975), commonly known as JTP, is an Indonesian retired police officer and politician who is currently serving as the Regent of North Tapanuli from 20 February 2025. He had previously served as the police chief of North Tapanuli from May to December 2017 before serving as a member of the North Sumatra Regional House of Representatives from 2019 to 2024.

== Early life and education ==
Jonius Taripar Parsaoran Hutabarat was born on 26 February 1975 in North Tapanuli to Jumalan Hutabarat and Rosinta Boru Hutagalung as the eldest of seven siblings. He completed his basic education at the Silangkitang state elementary school in Sipahutar, Sipoholon, North Tapanuli, in 1989. He then continued his education to the Sipoholon state middle school, graduating in 1991, and then to the Binjai state high school, where he finished his secondary education in 1994.

Hutabarat studied chemistry at the University of North Sumatra, graduating in 1999. He received his master's and doctorate in the same subject from the university in 2009 and 2017, respectively. Hutabarat completed several specialized police training programs, including the Forensic Laboratory Officer Education in 2001, the Police Inspector Advanced School in 2009, and the Middle Police Staff and Leadership School in 2014.

== Police career ==
Hutabarat's career in the police began in 2000 as a junior officer at the Medan police, before being transferred to forensics the next year. He was assigned to the police's forensic science laboratory in Medan. He held a number of key positions in the laboratory, including as chief of fire investigation and chief of physics and computer forensics. During his tenure, he conducted crime scene investigations on fire incidents in Medan in 2012, 2013, and 2015.

On 8 May 2017, Hutabarat was appointed as the chief of the North Tapanuli Police. He assumed office on 24 May. Less than half a year into tenure as police chief, Hutabarat registered himself as a candidate for the Regent of North Tapanuli, sparking criticism from observers due to his status as a police officer. Member of the National Police Commission Poengky Indarti urged Hutabarat to resign from the police, while Martahan Sohuturon from CNN Indonesia described Hutabarat's candidacy, and other police officers who ran in the local election, as a sign that the police failed to undergo proper reforms since the Fall of Suharto. Hutabarat resigned from his post on 16 December that year and retired from the police altogether on 12 February 2018.

== Political career ==
=== 2018 North Tapanuli election ===
Hutabarat registered himself as a candidate for the regent of North Tapanuli in early January 2018, with Frengky Simanjuntak as his running mate. He initially picked Samuel Basar P. Hutauruk, the son of the chairwoman of the NasDem Party in North Tapanuli, although he later cancelled the decision, prompting the party to divert their support to incumbent candidate Nikson Nababan. The Hutabarat-Hutauruk pair was supported by the People's Conscience Party, Gerindra Party, Democratic Party, and the Indonesian Justice and Unity Party. The pair eventually lost to incumbent Nikson Nababan, winning only in North Tapanuli's capital Tarutung and its vicinities. Shortly after Hutabarat's loss, protesters stormed the local electoral supervision office, accusing the election as being marred by fraud. Protesters carried a mock funeral bier, burned tires, and allegedly threw Molotov cocktails, although the latter was denied by the police. North Tapanuli's election supervisor chief, Sardion Situmeang, was injured by a thrown rock. Although initial rumors stated that the protesters were part of Hutabarat's supporters, further investigation demonstrated that none of the protesters were supporters of any candidate and that they acted on their own initiative. Hutabarat, and another independent candidate, attempted to dispute the election results to the Constitutional Court, accusing violations in the election that includes manipulation of the final voter list and changes to official documents, vote-buying and intimidation targeting village heads and local officials, and administrative misconduct before and after the voting process. The dispute was eventually rejected due to failure to meet the legal threshold required for the court to proceed with the case.

=== DPRD member ===
Following his loss in the 2018 North Tapanuli election, Hutabarat ran for the North Sumatra Regional House of Representatives from the Perindo Party, representing the North Sumatera 9 electoral district. He was elected to the parliament with 27,996 votes and became the sole representative of the party in the North Sumatra Regional House of Representatives. He, along with 99 other members, was installed on 16 September 2019. Within the DPRD, he was entrusted with the role of Secretary of Commission A.

During his tenure, Hutabarat organized tryouts for students preparing for final exams and initiated affordable markets during shortages of essential goods like cooking oil. He also provided assistance to North Tapanuli residents during the natural disasters in Pangaribuan-Garoga. On 4 October 2023, he was appointed as the daily chairman of Perindo in North Sumatra.

== Regent of North Tapanuli ==
Hutabarat was successfully reelected in the 2024 legislative election, although he eventually decided to resign in order to ran for a second time as the Regent of North Tapanuli. His running mate, Deni Lumbantoruan, was the former vice rector of the Del Institute of Technology. He was supported by seven political parties, including his own party and major parties Golkar, Gerindra Party, and NasDem Party. In the election, he faced the Indonesian Democratic Party of Struggle-supported Satika Simamora, the wife of Nikson Nababan. Hutabarat won an absolute majority in the election with 105,505 votes, or 64.27% of the total votes. Satika Simamora attempted to challenge the results, citing the alleged non-neutrality of the acting regent, but was eventually rejected. The Constitutional Court confirmed the electoral commission's decision to name Hutabarat as the winner of the election. He was installed along with most other regional leaders elected in 2024 on 20 February 2025.

== Personal life ==
Hutabarat is married to Neny Angelina Boru Purba, and together they have three children.
