= Dimposma Sihombing =

Dimposma Sihombing (born 28 February 1978) is an Indonesian bureaucrat who is currently serving as the Director for Social, Cultural, and Institutional Synchronization in the Ministry of Villages and Development of Disadvantaged Regions since 1 December 2022. He also briefly served as the acting regent of North Tapanuli from 2024 until his replacement by the elected Jonius Taripar Parsaoran Hutabarat in 2025.

== Early life and education ==
Dimposma was born on 28 February 1978 in Tarutung. After the passing of his father, he was raised by his mother, Tiur boru Marpaung, who worked a traditional fruit vendor (parengge-rengge) at the Tarutung Market. Upon completing his basic studies at the 2nd Batak Christian Protestant Church High School in his hometown, he continued his studies to the State Administrative Science Colleges, where he obtained his bachelor's degree in government administration and his master's degree in regional development management. He received his doctorate in regional planning from the University of North Sumatra in 2019.

== Bureaucratic career ==
Dimposma served in a number of roles at the Toba Samosir Regency government as a civil servant. He served as chief of cooperations at Toba Samosir's secretariat and chief of welfare and personnel management at Toba Samosir's civil service agency. He was then named as the chief of the Silaen subdistrict on 17 January 2013, serving for a one-year tenure. During his tenure, Dimposma urged Silaen residents to be wary of fire risks. On one occasion, he mobilized residents in a village to clear landslide debris from irrigation channels.

Dimposma returned to Toba Samosir government with his appointment as the chief of governance in the secretariat on 4 February 2014. Less than a few months later, Dimposma was dismissed from his post and was placed as a regular staff in the secretariat of North Tapanuli. He the assumed office as the chief of the integrated permit office of North Tapanuli on 25 July 2014. His post was reorganized a few months later and he was named as the chief of the integrated permit and investment agency of North Tapanuli on 21 January 2015. During his tenure, Dimposma ordered the closure of several unlicensed buildings and factories, including an asphalt mixing plant. He was dismissed from his post on 9 February 2016 due to ethical violations.

Upon serving in regional positions, Dimposma was reassigned to the ministry of village, development of disadvantaged regions, and transmigrations in Jakarta. He served as the chief of the evaluations subdirectorate in the ministry. On 1 December 2022, he was appointed as the director for synchronization of social, cultural, and institutional development in the ministry. After the ministry was split into two, Dimposma joined the ministry of village and development of disadvantaged regions, where he retained his old post and reinstated as the director of socio-cultural and disadvantaged regions development synchronization on 24 December 2024. During his tenure, he was nominated as the acting regent of Dairi, although his named was dropped in favor of Dairi's regional secretary.
