= Robinson Butarbutar =

The Right Reverend Robinson Butarbutar Ephorus (Emeritus)
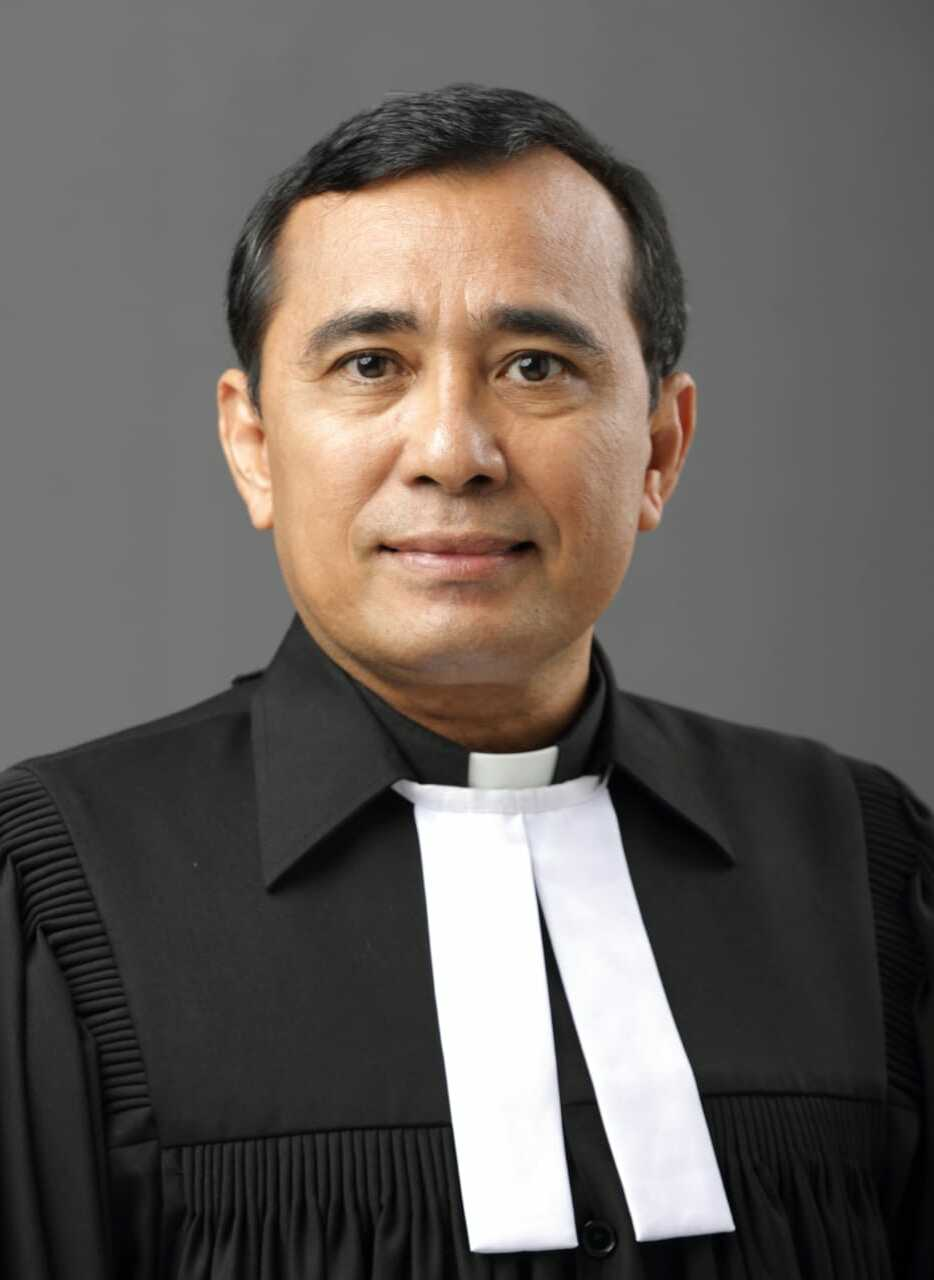

17th Ephorus of HKBP
- In office September 19, 2020 – December 8, 2024
- Preceded by: Darwin Lumbantobing
- Succeeded by: Victor Tinambunan

Personal details
- Born: January 1, 1961 (age 65) Simalungun, North Sumatra
- Spouse: Srimiaty Rayani Simatupang
- Children: Martin Butarbutar; Melanchthon Bonifacio Butarbutar; Emely Katharina Butarbutar

Robinson Butarbutar (born 1 January 1961) is an Indonesian religious leader who served as the 17th Ephorus of Huria Kristen Batak Protestan (HKBP), a Protestant Christian denomination in Indonesia from 2020 to 2024. He was ordained as a HKBP minister in May 1993 in Tangerang, West Java.

== Early life and education ==
Robinson Butarbutar was born on January 1, 1961, in Simalungun, North Sumatra. He is married to Srimiaty Rayani Simatupang and has three children, Martin Butarbutar, Melanchthon Bonifacio Butarbutar, and Emely Katharina Butarbutar. His father is Djarudin Butarbutar and his mother is Tiodor Pardede. Butarbutar received his formal education in various institutions, including SD Negeri 1 Bah Jambi, SMP YPU Bah Jambi, PGA HKI Pematangsiantar, STT-HKBP Pematangsiantar, London Bible College, and Trinity Theological College. He also received informal education from institutions such as LWF Communication Institution, Cambridge School of Languages, ÖSW Bochum, and Schramm Institute.

== Career ==
Throughout his career, Robinson has served in various positions within the HKBP and other religious organizations. He has been a candidate minister, teacher, and head of the Biro Oikumene (office of ecumenism) at the HKBP headquarters, as well as a guest researcher at Tyndale House Cambridge and an executive staff member and regional coordinator for the United Evangelical Mission in Asia.
