= S. A. E. Nababan =

Indonesian Lutheran prelate (1933–2021)

The Right Reverend S. A. E. Nababan Ephorus (Emeritus)
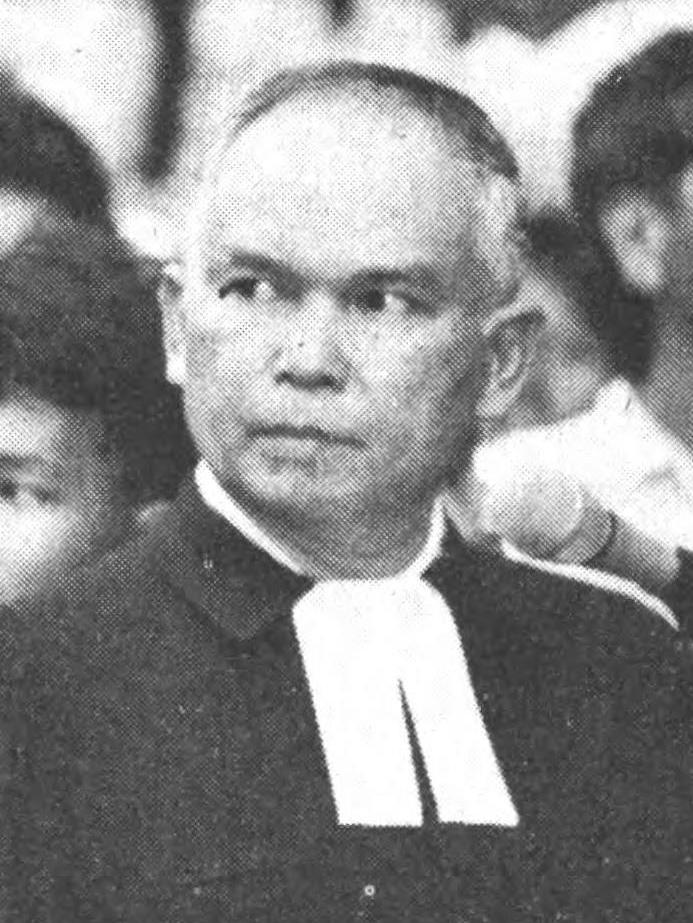
- Church: HKBP
- Elected: 31 January 1987
- Quashed: 28 November 1992 (with government recognition); 1 November 1998 (without government recognition
- Predecessor: G. H. M. Siahaan
- Successor: J.R. Hutauruk
- Opposed to: S. M. Siahaan; P. W. T. Simanjuntak
- Other post: Chairman of the Council of Churches in Indonesia

Personal details
- Born: 24 May 1933 Tarutung, Tapanuli, Dutch East Indies
- Died: 8 May 2021 (aged 87) Jakarta, Indonesia
- Denomination: Protestantism (Lutheranism)
- Parents: Jonathan Laba Nababan; Erna Dora Lumbantobing
- Spouse: Alida Lientje Lumbantobing (m. 1964)

Soritua Albert Ernst Nababan (24 May 1933 – 8 May 2021) was an Indonesian Lutheran minister who was elected as the ephorus (bishop) of the Batak Christian Protestant Church (HKBP) at its 48th Sinode Godang (Great Synod) on 31 January 1987.

Born into a family of teachers, Soritua attended primary and secondary education in North Sumatra before migrating to Jakarta to pursue a theological career. After being consecrated as a priest in 1956, he briefly served in Medan before pursuing further studies in Germany. He left the country in 1963 with a doctorate degree in theology and held offices in the East Asian Christian Conference and the Council of Churches in Indonesia before being elected as Ephorus of HKBP in 1987.

Soritua's tenure as ephorus was marred with conflicts between him and the government-backed opposition group, which culminated in the takeover of HKBP by the government and the split of HKBP following the 51st Sinode Godang of HKBP in 1992. Although he was unrecognized by the government as the Ephorus after 1992, he was still recognized by various international ecumenical organizations. He also continued to be active in various Christian organizations during his decade-long tenure.

The split ended after both parties were reconciled in 1998, and Soritua handed his Ephorus seat to an acting officeholder. He was elected as one of the presidents of the World Council of Churches in 2006 for an eight-year term. He died on 8 May 2021.

== Early life ==
Soritua was born on 24 May 1933 in Tarutung, Tapanuli, as the third of ten children. His father, Jonathan Laba Nababan, and his mother, Erna Dora Lumbantobing, both worked as teachers. Soritua started his education at the Hollandsch-Inlandsche School (elementary school for native children) in 1939 and later moved to a People's School in Siborong-borong following the Japanese occupation of the Dutch East Indies. After graduating from the school in 1945, he continued to study at the junior high school in Siborong-borong and finished in 1948. He then continued to a high school in Tarutung and IMS in Pematang Siantar. While attending high school, Soritua was also enlisted in the Students' Army, a paramilitary unit during the Indonesian National Revolution that fought against the Dutch.

After graduating from high school, Soritua initially wanted to become a doctor. Nevertheless, he pursued further studies at the Jakarta Theological School in 1950 and graduated from the school in 1956. He graduated with a cum laude distinction and earned a bachelor's degree in theology. He was consecrated as a HKBP pendeta (reverend) on 24 June 1956.

== Evangelical career ==
After being consecrated, Soritua started his career as a reverend at HKBP Medan's youth ministry. Less than a year later, Soritua returned to study at the Kirchliche Hochschule in Wuppertal, West Germany. Following his graduation from the academy in 1958, Soritua remained in Germany to pursue a doctorate degree in theology at the Heidelberg University. He graduated from the university with a thesis titled Kyrios-Bekenntnis und Mission bei Paulus, Eine exegetische Untersuchung zu Roem 14 und 15. Professor Günther Bornkamm became his doctoral advisor during the making of his thesis.

Aside from his university studies in Germany, Soritua also served as a youth minister at the Association of Protestant Student Congregations in Germany (Verband der Evangelischen Studierendengemeinden in Deutschland, ESGiD), with the special task of guiding foreign students studying in Germany. After receiving his doctorate in theology Soritua returned to Indonesia in 1963 and was elected as the first youth secretary of the East Asian Christian Conference (EACC). During the Indonesia–Malaysia confrontation that occurred afterwards, Soritua had to move his office to different countries several times. After the confrontation de-escalated in 1966, Soritua was sent by the Council of Churches in Indonesia (CCI) to Malaysia in January 1966 as part of a goodwill mission.

A year before his resignation from the EACC, Soritua was appointed the General Secretary of the Council of Churches in Indonesia in 1967. During his tenure as general secretary, Soritua was tasked to prepare the general assembly of the World Council of Churches (WCC) at Uppsala in 1968, during which he developed his social theology, a theology that would be applied during his later tenure as Ephorus.

Soritua served as general secretary for 17 years until he became the Chairman of the Council of Churches in Indonesia in 1984. He was the first chairman of the organization after it changed its name from the Council of Churches in Indonesia to the Union of Churches in Indonesia (UCI). During his tenure in the UCI, Soritua was considered as the most prominent evangelical member of the HKBP. In addition to his office at the CCI, Soritua also became a member of the National Film Council, a body made by the Department of Information to advise the department on filmography.

== Ephorus of HKBP ==
On the last day of the 48th Sinode Godang (Great Synod) of HKBP on 31 January 1987, Soritua was elected as the Ephorus of HKBP, defeating his former colleague and Secretary General of HKBP P.M. Sihombing. Sihombing's supporters, who consisted of twenty pastors, some other ministers, and lay members, later accused Soritua of fraud and cheating to win the election, but to no avail.

According to Muchtar Pakpahan, aside from being disapproved by his competitor, Soritua was also disliked by the President of Indonesia at that time, Suharto. Muchtar argued that there were two reasons for Suharto's hatred of Soritua, with the first being Soritua's reluctance to sign a letter of support for Suharto's re-election as president, as he believed that clergymen do not participate in political movements, and the second being his disapproval of the existence of the Indorayon Pulp company—a company owned by Suharto's cronies—in North Tapanuli, which he argued was the cause of environmental damage and suffering of the people in the region.

=== Programs ===
After his assumption of the Ephorus seat, Soritua started an improvement, ‘reformation’ and development program, which he believed would fix the decline that HKBP has experienced in the last twenty years of its existence. Soritua instructed HKBP members to cease practicing old beliefs and the worshipping of ancestors after an earthquake that hit Tarutung, the headquarters of HKBP and the base for HKBP members, in April 1987.

To pursue his goal, Soritua established the Nehemia Evangelisation Team (Tim Evangelisasi Nehemia, TEN), with links to Evangelical and Charismatic groups. The P.M. Sihombing group—later referred to as the Parritrit group—accused TEN of bringing "a serious danger to the spiritual life of the Christian Bataks and especially to HKBP". After failing to prove the accusations, members of the Parritrit group were reprimanded from their offices at the 49th Sinode Godang in November 1988.

=== Opposition and government intervention ===
The mass dismissal that occurred at the 49th Sinode Godang further aggravated the opposition against Soritua. His opposition to the government in various issues triggered government intervention against HKBP. Based on a memo enacted by the Minister of Religious Affairs in September 1990, Chairman of the Supreme Advisory Council Maraden Panggabean formed a pacification team to "resolve the internal problems of HKBP". Feeling superior following the establishment of the pacification team, the Parritrit group terrorized HKBP's headquarters. The Parritrit group and the pacification team became more and more explicit in their goal to overthrow Soritua when Panggabean announced the phrase nasida do sisaehononhon (he who should be overthrown) at a speech during his trip to socialize the existence of the pacification team. In addition to the already existent interventions and conflicts, Soritua himself also often conflicted with his own Secretary General OPT Simorangkir, who would later be revealed as the right hand man of Panggabean in HKBP's internal structure.

The 50th Sinode Godang was later held from 8 to 12 April 1991. The Sinode Godang saw Soritua condemning groups that used HKBP's name without any legitimacy. Soritua also pardoned the previously fired members of the Parritrit group. However, after this Sinode Godang, further interventions were conducted by the military forces, where army units were often seen conducting intelligence operations in churches.

=== 51st Sinode Godang of HKBP ===
The 51st Sinode Godang, which was held from 23 to 28 November 1992, was the peak of conflict between the Soritua faction and the government-backed Parritrit group. Several days before the Sinode Godang was held, Soritua was brought to Germany to undergo a treatment. He managed to return on 4 November, in time for the Sinode Godang.

Unlike any other Sinode Godang held before, the 51st Sinode Godang was heavily guarded. According to the Soritua faction, around 400 army members were stationed in the building and the military resort commander, Colonel Daniel Toding, established a room nicknamed the Tactical Command Center. Although there were delegates who caused commotion during the event, the stationed army stood still and did nothing. The chaos was so bad that Soritua himself ended the Sinode Godang at 22.00, two hours before the intended closure of the Sinode Godang. He left the event and went back home after ending the Sinode Godang. Colonel Toding announced after Soritua's departure that the government would take over the control of HKBP.

A month later, on 23 December 1992, Major-General H. R. Pramono, Colonel Toding's superior, appointed S. M. Siahaan as the acting Ephorus. Siahaan was installed in a heavily-guarded compound eight days later. The appointment of Siahaan sparked protests from both national and international organizations. The Soritua faction argued that the installation of Siahaan was illegitimate because not only did the office of acting Ephorus violate the constitution of HKBP but also that S. M. Siahaan was a corrupt figure who had been deemed guilty of corruption cases at the HKBP Nommensen University.

=== HKBP Crisis ===
The pro-Soritua camp and the majority of HKBP members refused to recognize the leadership of Siahaan over HKBP, citing unconstitutionality and external intervention. The government-backed camp held an extraordinary Sinode Godang in February to elect a definitive Ephorus. On the last day of the event—13 February 1993—P. W. T. Simanjuntak was elected as the government-backed Ephorus, while S. M. Siahaan became Simanjuntak's secretary general. The conflict between Soritua faction—later known as the AP-SSA faction (Aturan Paraturan-Setia Sampai Akhir, Rules and Guidance-Faithful Until the End) split HKBP into two. International organizations kept recognizing Soritua as the legitimate Ephorus, a decision which was shunned by Simanjuntak.

=== Reconciliation ===
After five years of division and split, the reconciliation process yielded fruit when on 1 November 1998, J.R. Hutauruk was appointed the acting Ephorus. Both the AP-SSA faction and the government-backed faction handed over their powers to Hutauruk. Hutauruk was elected as the definitive Ephorus at a reconciliation Sinode Godang on 20 December that same year. Although the division was formally abolished through this Sinode Godang, it took several years to fully recover from the decade long division.

== International ecumenical organizations ==
During his tenure in CCI and HKBP, Soritua also held offices in various international ecumenical organizations. Soritua was elected as the President of Christian Conference of Asia—the successor of EACC—from 1990 and 1995. He was also elected as the chairman of the Commission on World Mission and Evangelism of WCC from 1975 until 1983 and as WCC's central and executive committee member from 1983 until 1991. In the Lutheran World Federation, Soritua also held important offices, namely as its First Vice President in 1970, Vice President in 1983, and as the chairman of the Lutheran World Service from 1990 until 1997.

Soritua was also active in United in Mission, an ecumenical organization covering 33 churches in Africa, Asia, and Europe. Soritua was appointed the moderator in 1988 and was re-elected in 1993.

After his retirement from HKBP, Soritua was elected as one of the presidents of the WCC in 2006. He served until 2014 in the position.

== Family ==
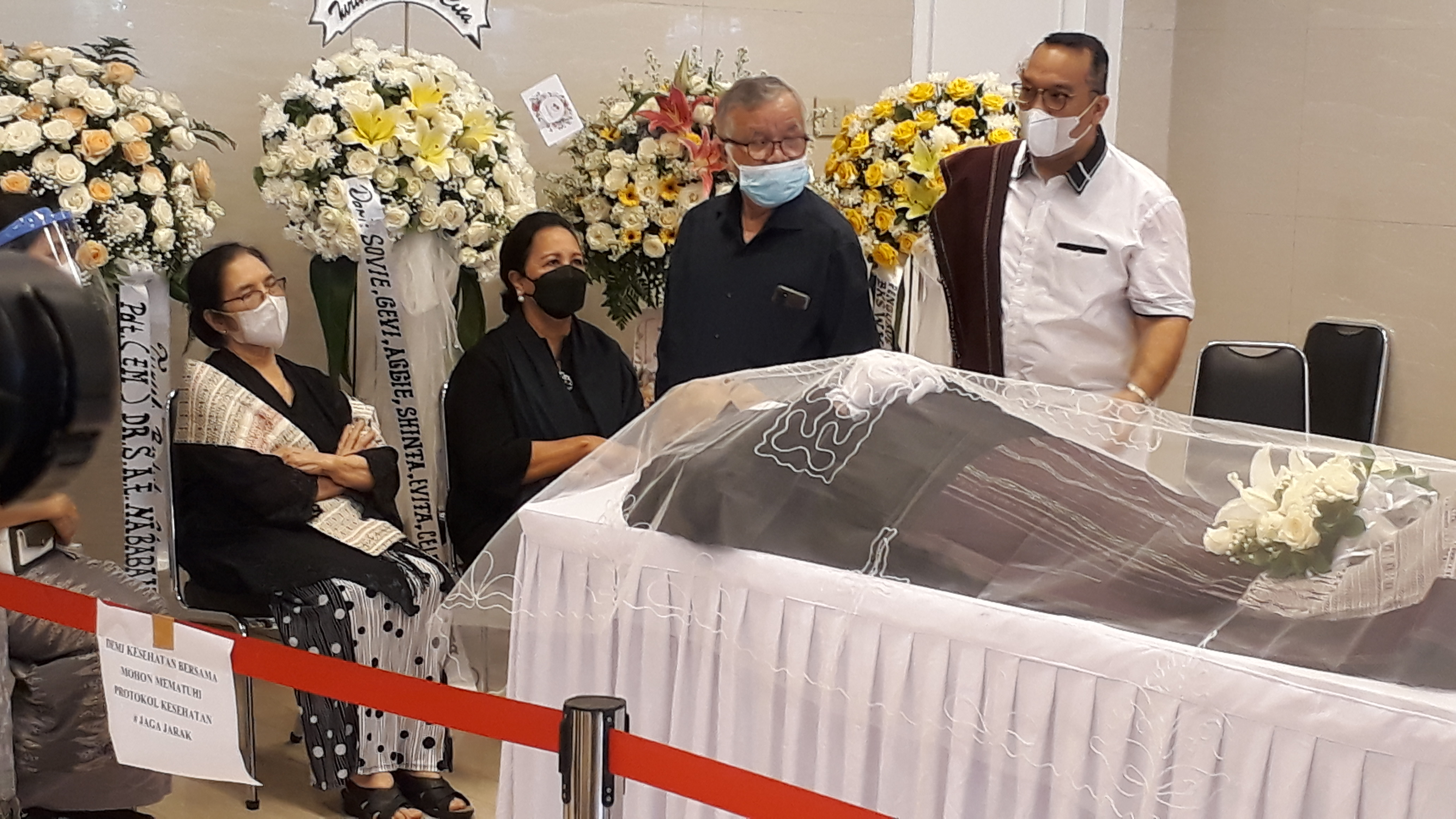
Soritua's family at the funeral home. At the far left is his wife, while one of his grandsons is at the far right.

Soritua was married to Alida Lientje Lumbantobing, a former lecturer at the Medan State Teachers' Institute, on 8 May 1964. The couple has two sons, Hotasi Diosdado (born 7 May 1965) and Sindartua Uli Tenang (born 1 November 1966), and a daughter named Ruth Bumbunan (born 18 February 1968).

== Death ==
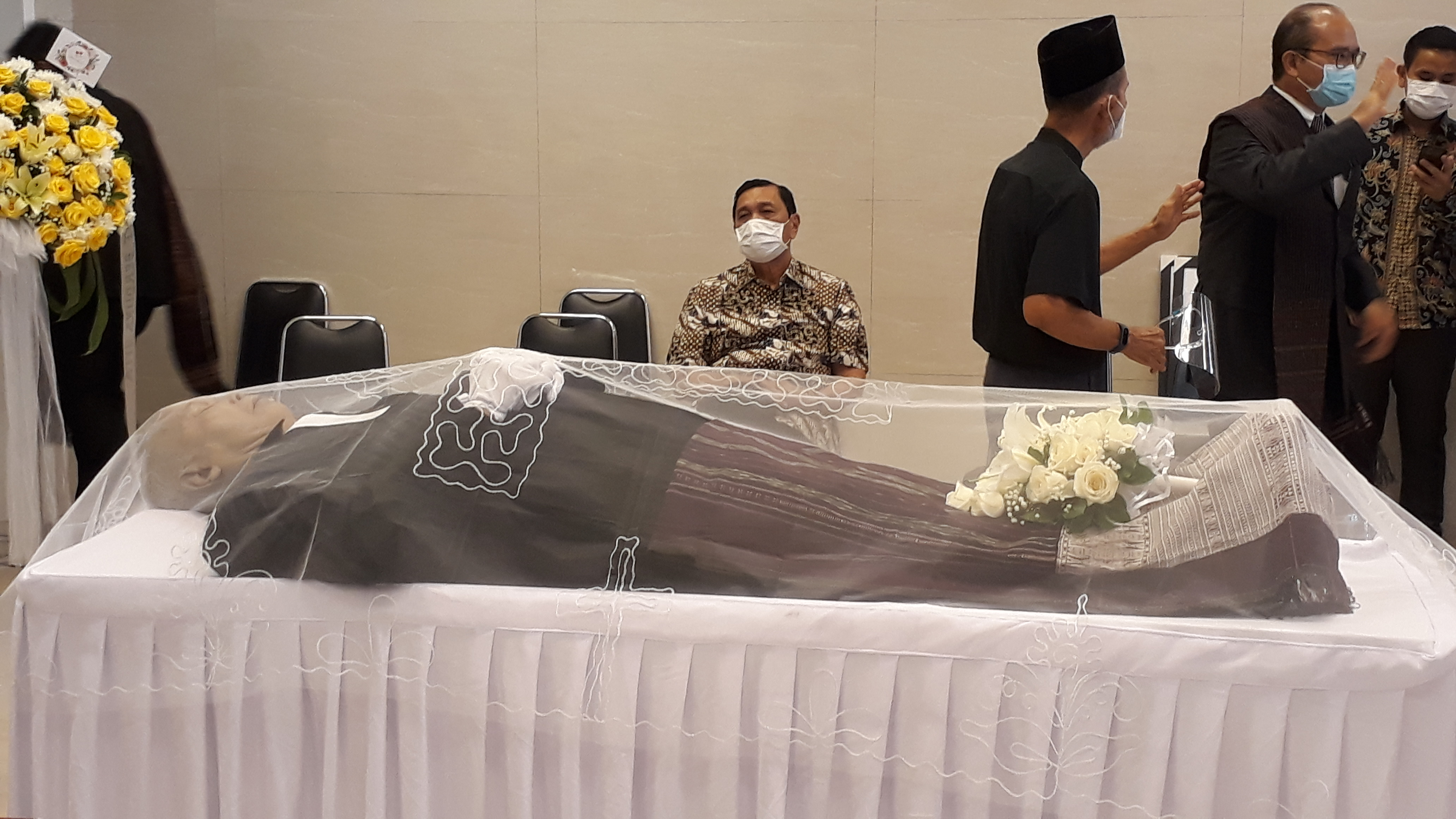
Coordinating Minister for Maritime and Investment Affairs, Luhut Binsar Panjaitan, observing the body of S. A. E. Nababan

Soritua died at approximately 16:18 WIB (West Indonesian time) on 8 May 2021 in the Medistra Hospital, Jakarta. His body was laid in state at the Gatot Subroto Army Hospital funeral home the day after. His body was brought to North Tapanuli on 11 May with a chartered flight and he was buried at his house in Siborong-Borong on the same day.

== Awards ==
=== Medals ===
- Order of St. Mesrop Mashtots (1 August 2020)

=== Honorary degrees ===
- Doctor of Law from St. Olaf College (27 July 1974)
- Doctor of Theology from University of Münster (19 January 1993)

== Bibliography ==
- Siregar, Hetty; Hardiyanto, Soegeng; Hutabarat, Rainy MP; Horoni, Arthur John, eds. (1994), Mencari Keseimbangan: Enam Puluh Tahun Pdt. D. Dr. S.A.E. Nababan LLD, Jakarta: Sinar Harapan
- Aritonang, Jan Sihar; Steenbrink, Karel Adriaan (2008), A History of Christianity in Indonesia, Brill, ISBN 978-90-04-17026-1, JSTOR 10.1163/j.ctv4cbgb1
- Pakpahan, Muchtar (1995), Potret Negara Indonesia, Yayasan Forum Adil Sejahtera
- Nadeak, Moksa; Manurung, Saut; Situmeang, Sabar; Gultom, Gomar; Butarbutar, Robinson; Sihombing, Mori; Sirait, Saut (1995), Krisis HKBP: Ujian Bagi Iman & Pengamalan Pancasila, Biro Informasi HKBP, ISBN 978-979-95010-0-4
