= Christianity and politics =

Aspect of political history

The relationship between Christianity and politics is a historically complex subject and a frequent source of disagreement throughout the history of Christianity, as well as in modern politics between the Christian right and Christian left. There have been a wide variety of ways in which thinkers have conceived of this relationship, with many arguing that Christianity directly supports a particular political ideology or philosophy. Along these lines, various thinkers have argued for Christian communism, Christian socialism, Christian nationalism, Christian anarchism, Christian libertarianism, Christian democracy, Christian fascism, the divine right of kings, or tsarist autocracy. Particularly in the United States, Christian interest groups play a role in pushing for Christian values. However, others believe that Christians should have little interest or participation in politics or government, or none at all.

== History ==
=== Antiquity ===
Early Christianity was most prominent in the Roman Empire, where it was illegal to practice Christianity and persecution of Christians took place. The first state to recognize Christianity as its official religion was the Kingdom of Armenia in 301. Christianity gained prominence in Roman politics during the reign of Constantine the Great, who favored Christianity and legalized its practice in the empire in 313. Christians were also appointed to government positions at this time. In 380, Trinitarian Christianity was made the official religion of the Roman Empire by Theodosius I. The first major instance of Christianity wielding power in politics took place in 390. After the Massacre of Thessalonica, the bishop of Milan forbade Emperor Theodosius the Eucharist until he repented, and Theodosius complied.

Early Christians were described by Celsus as those who refused military service and would not accept public office, nor assume any responsibility for the governing of cities. Origen confirms this description and adds that Christians do more for the good of the empire by forming an "army of piety" that prays for the well-being of the emperor and the safety of the empire. It has been argued that Christianity made a significant positive contribution to the development of modern democracy.

=== Middle Ages ===
Christianity dominated European politics in the Middle Ages. During the fall of the Western Roman Empire, the Pope effectively served as the political leader of the region. The Byzantine Empire continued to be the center of the church in the East. In 800, Charlemagne was crowned by Pope Leo III as the Emperor of the Romans, establishing a precedent of interdependence of the church with the Carolingian Empire, and eventually, the Holy Roman Empire.

The church also maintained strong influence over the other kingdoms of Europe. Secular rulers would support missionary efforts in order to enlarge their realms. Bishops and abbots were not only church leaders, but often also large land-owning princes and thus vassals of secular feudal lords. The line dividing church and state interests was not always clear. The church also ruled its own territory directly in the form of the Papal States.

The most notable instances of the church exercising influence over the kingdoms were the Crusades, when it called the Christian kingdoms to arms to fight religious wars. Some Crusades aimed to recover and secure Jerusalem and the Holy Land from the Muslims (1095-1291); other Crusades attacked the Cathari (1209-1229), and the Teutonic Knights and their supporters fought against non-Catholics (including Eastern Orthodox Christians) in the Baltic Sea area (1147-1410). In Spain, the Crusader mindset continued for several centuries after the last crusade in the Middle East, in the form of the Reconquista, a series of wars (711-1492) fought to recover the Iberian Peninsula from the Muslim Moors.

=== Reformation ===
The Reformation caused a political backlash in the Holy Roman Empire. In response, the Diet of Worms was assembled, and promotion of Lutheranism was made illegal. The English Reformation was deeply influenced by English politics. When the church refused to grant an annulment to the marriage of Henry VIII, he formed the Anglican tradition through the Church of England under the political rule of the crown.

== Denominations ==
=== Catholicism ===
The Catholic Church is deeply intertwined with the history of European politics. It developed alongside the status of Christianity as the official religion of the Roman Empire and persisted through the Middle Ages as one of the most powerful political forces in Europe. In 2015, Pope Francis stated that Catholics have a duty to participate in politics to improve the world. The Catholic Church does not officially take political stances and encourages followers to come to their own political decisions, but it also states that these decisions must be made in accordance with natural law.

The Catholic Church in the United States has sought to discipline Catholic politicians that take pro-choice stances on abortion, most notably President Joe Biden. Conservative, moderate, and liberal Catholics all have a major presence in the United States.

==== Catholicism and war ====
Catholics historically have had a wide variety of positions on issues of war and peace. The historical peace churches are now the chief exponents of Christian pacifism, but this was an issue that first came to light during the Roman Empire.

Soldiers in the Roman military who converted to Roman Catholicism were among the first who had to face these issues. Catholics in the Roman military had to confront a number of issues, that go beyond the obvious one about whether war could be reconciled with the Christian religion. Paganism saturated Roman military institutions. Idols of the Greco-Roman gods appeared on the legionary standards. Military service involved oaths of loyalty that might contradict Catholic teachings even if they did not invoke pagan gods. The duties of Roman military personnel included law enforcement as well as defense, and as such Roman soldiers were sometimes obliged to participate in the persecution of Christians themselves. Sexual licentiousness was considered to be a moral hazard to which military personnel were exposed. See Imperial cult (ancient Rome).

The conversion of Constantine I transformed the relationship of the Christian churches with the Roman military even as it transformed the relationship of the churches with the Roman state. A strongly contrary idea, sometimes called "caesaropapism", identified the now Catholic Empire with the Church militant. The Latin word Christianitas originally meant the body of all Christians conceived as a political body, or the territory of the globe occupied by Christians, something akin to the English word Christendom. Apocalyptic texts were reinterpreted. The idea of a Christian empire continued to play a powerful role in Western Europe even after the collapse of Roman rule there; the name of the Holy Roman Empire bears witness to its claims to sanctity as well as to universal rule. An apocryphal apocalypse of Pseudo-Methodius, written during the seventh century, depicts a saintly Last Roman Emperor who holds his earthly kingdom in anticipation of Christ's return. According to Pseudo-Methodius, the Last Emperor will wage war in the last days against God's enemies, including Gog and Magog and the Antichrist.

=== Protestantism ===
Anglicanism was developed when King Henry VIII established the Church of England as the state church of the Kingdom of England. The Church of England is still closely involved in British politics and disputes sometimes take place over its role. The Hawaiian Kingdom also had an Anglican church as its official state church, the Church of Hawaii in the late 19th century.

Southern Baptism leans heavily conservative and is involved with the politics of the Republican Party in the United States. Lutheranism is influential in the politics of the Nordic countries. The Church of Denmark, the Church of Iceland, and the Church of Norway are all Lutheran state churches, while the Church of Sweden was a state church until 2000. Calvinism was the official religion of the Netherlands while the Dutch Reformed Church was the state church. The United Methodist Church advocates political activism among Methodists. Methodists in the United States tend to lean conservative or moderate.

Anabaptism adheres to a two kingdom concept. This is the belief that the kingdom of heaven or of Christ (the Church) is different and distinct from the kingdoms of this world. It essentially means the separation of church and state but differs from other Protestant approaches in their belief that the separation is absolute and the church has no right to interfere in the affairs of the state any more than the state in the church. This viewpoint is still held by the most religiously conservative Anabaptist groups, such as the Amish, Old Order Mennonites, Conservative Mennonites, and Old Order River Brethren. Not all Anabaptist churches subscribe to anarchist ideologies. The Hutterite church traces its roots back to the Radical Reformation and Jacoub Hutter, but respect and adhere to government authority. The Bruderhof, another church community in the Anabaptist tradition, respects the god-given authority of the state, while acknowledging that their ultimate allegiance is to God.

The Batak Christian Protestant Church a.k.a. HKBP in Indonesia is referred to as a political church because it holds strong views and involvement in social and state issues, although it does not engage in practical politics. This church engages in politics "based on love," namely by encouraging its members to participate healthily in politics for the public good, without justifying any means. This view is supported by church leaders, who state that politics is the church's duty and calling to advance the interests of society.

Here are some points that explain, why this church is considered a political church:

- Orientation towards public interest: The church has a political view that focuses on improving the interests of society and the public.
- Support for political parties (in history): In the past, HKBP openly supported the Indonesian Christian Party (Parkindo) due to their shared Protestant Christian background, as seen in the Godang Synod of 1953 and 1954.
- Politics based on love: The church distinguishes between practical politics (justifying any means) and politics based on love, which prioritizes honesty and the values of love in achieving goals.
- Support from the leadership: The Supreme Leader of the Batak Christian Protestant Church, Ephorus Victor Tinambunan, firmly stated that "the church must be involved in politics" because politics can improve public and community interests.

== Ideologies ==
=== Liberalism ===
Separation of church and state is a prominent idea in liberalism, so direct influence of Christianity in liberal politics is typically limited.

=== Conservatism ===
White evangelicals in the US have tended toward affiliation with the Republican party.

Mainline Protestants, which once defined the center of American political, religious, and cultural life, have declined by two-thirds in the past fifty years.

Christian voters, especially white Christian voters, generally favored Donald Trump over Kamala Harris in the 2024 US Presidential election.

Conservatism in Europe and the Americas is heavily influenced by Christianity. The Christian right within evangelical Christianity has formed many of its political views on social issues such as abortion, homosexuality and public education from passages in both the Old Testament and the New Testament. In the Epistle to the Romans, chapter 13:1-7, Paul instructs Roman Christians to submit to government. See also 1 Peter 2:13-17 and Titus 3:1 for parallels. Mainstream theologians and the Christian right have interpreted Romans 13:1–7 to mean Christians should support the state and wield the sword when necessary, as God has instituted the idea of governments to be his main tool to preserve social order.

=== Socialism ===
The first Jewish Christian communities, as described in the Acts of the Apostles, were organized along a principle of communal ownership of goods. Some expressions of the Christian left have interpreted passages in Acts to mean that an ideal society would be based on Christian socialism or Christian communism. However, passages that have far greater influence for Christians who actively care for the poor are the words of Jesus, usually found in red in most bibles, which appear to give priority to the poor as a Christian obligation.

There are some intentional Christian communities that, inspired by the first Christian church as described in Acts 2 and 4, share all their possessions in an effort to put into action Christ's command to love God and neighbour. The Simple Way, the Bruderhof communities, and the Hutterites are all inspired, to some degree, by the model of church community described in Acts. More common expressions of Christian love and commitment to the poor are churches of all denominations that fund localised soup kitchens, charity shops and shelters for the homeless as well as mission programs overseas. In Roman Catholic circles the doctrine of preference for the poor has been important since 1979 and it still drives the church's practice of hospitality to those in any kind of need.

=== Anarchism ===
Not only does the action of Governments not deter men from crimes; on the contrary, it increases crime by always disturbing and lowering the moral standard of society. Nor can this be otherwise, since always and everywhere a Government, by its very nature, must put in the place of the highest, eternal, religious law (not written in books but in the hearts of men, and binding on every one) its own unjust, man-made laws, the object of which is neither justice nor the common good of all but various considerations of home and foreign expediency.

— Leo Tolstoy, The Meaning of the Russian Revolution

More than any other Bible source, the Sermon on the Mount is used as the basis for Christian anarchism. The foundation of Christian anarchism is a rejection of violence, with Leo Tolstoy's The Kingdom of God Is Within You regarded as a key text. Tolstoy takes the viewpoint that all governments who wage war, and churches who in turn support those governments, are an affront to the Christian principles of nonviolence and nonresistance.

Christians have interpreted Romans 13:1–7 to mean they should support the state and wield the sword when requested, as God has sanctified the state to be his main tool to preserve social order. Christian anarchists do not share this interpretation of Romans 13 but given Paul's declaration to submit to authorities they do not attempt to overthrow the state. However anarchists still describe the state as an evil power executing wrath and vengeance. As wrath and vengeance are opposite to the Christian values of returning good for evil, Christian anarchists neither support, nor participate in, the state.

Christian eschatology and various Christian anarchists, such as Jacques Ellul, have identified the State and political power as the Beast in the Book of Revelation. Apocalyptic texts frequently coach radical criticism of existing regimes under the form of allegory; this, at least, is a frequently mentioned interpretation of the Book of Daniel, frequently interpreted by secular scholars as a second-century diatribe against Antiochus IV Epiphanes, who persecuted the Jews and provoked the revolt of the Maccabees. The Book of Revelation contains even more vehement imagery, which many secular scholars believe was directed against the Roman empire. The empire, or the city of Rome itself, are identified by these scholars as the Whore of Babylon, and the Roman emperor becomes the Beast or Antichrist. Both divine punishment and economic and military catastrophe are prophesied against "Babylon", which most scholars agree is John's code name for Rome.

No call to arms is contained within the Christian apocalypse. Instead, the calamities that doom the oppressive regime represented by these allegorical figures are expected from divine intervention alone. Nevertheless, if the books are properly read in this way, they seem to evidence deep hostility to the Roman government, no doubt a reaction to the persecution of Christians by the Roman state.

=== Libertarianism ===
An emerging tradition of political thought, Christian libertarians maintain that state intervention to promote piety or generosity can be unethical and counterproductive. Coercion by threat of violence robs otherwise moral acts of their virtue, inspires resentment and disrespect even for just laws on the part of the coerced, and has a spiritually deleterious effect upon the coercers. As John Chrysostom, late 4th-century Church Father and Archbishop of Constantinople, writes in his work On the Priesthood (Book II, Section 3),

For Christians above all men are not permitted forcibly to correct the failings of those who sin. Secular judges indeed, when they have captured malefactors under the law, show their authority to be great, and prevent them even against their will from following their own devices: but in our case the wrong-doer must be made better, not by force, but by persuasion. For neither has authority of this kind for the restraint of sinners been given us by law, nor, if it had been given, should we have any field for the exercise of our power, inasmuch as God rewards those who abstain from evil by their own choice, not of necessity. Consequently much skill is required that our patients may be induced to submit willingly to the treatment prescribed by the physicians, and not only this, but that they may be grateful also for the cure. For if any one when he is bound becomes restive (which it is in his power to be), he makes the mischief worse; and if he should pay no heed to the words which cut like steel, he inflicts another wound by means of this contempt, and the intention to heal only becomes the occasion of a worse disorder. For it is not possible for any one to cure a man by compulsion against his will.

While Christian libertarians disagree over whether and to what extent agents of the state possess the moral authority to intervene in the lives of citizens, government involvement is generally viewed with skepticism and suspicion. As with the Christian left, war and nation-building are common targets of ethical scrutiny from Christians espousing the libertarian philosophy.

The governing maxim for many natural-rights libertarians, including those of faith, is the non-aggression principle, which forbids the initiation of force but does not preclude the restrained, proportional use of defensive or disciplinary violence against the initiator. It has been compared to the Golden Rule and its converse, the Silver Rule. Christian libertarians often defend the institution of private property by pointing to the many Biblical injunctions against theft, to the voluntary nature of faith and the sharing of goods in early Christian communities, and to the fact that Jesus never advocated the redistribution of income and wealth by political means.

According to Christian libertarianism, to seize the life, liberty, or legitimately acquired property of an individual by coercion, even for that person's well-being or for the benefit of others, constitutes a violation of his or her human dignity as an image-bearer of God. Thus, most forms of taxation and all laws that prevent or distort free and nonviolent exchange are unacceptable. The classical doctrine of original or ancestral sin furthermore suggests to Christian libertarians that political (and for some left-libertarians, economic) power ought to be democratically distributed and decentralized to guard against government oppression and the natural human tendency to corruption. In opposition to centralized political authority, Christian libertarians frequently cite the eighth chapter of the Biblical book of 1 Samuel (1 Kings LXX), in which God tells the prophet Samuel that the children of Israel have rejected Him by demanding a king to reign over them, and He describes the many ways such a king will oppress the people.

While one of the Church's societal roles may be to promote righteousness in service and humble obedience to God, equal liberty is the highest or only political value. The state's raison d'être is to prevent rights violations, to quarantine or punish justly, and ideally to restore offenders so they can again peaceably dwell and participate in civil society.

=== Fascism ===
After the onset of fascism in the 1920s and 1930s, several fascist movements adopted Christian ideas. Notable Christian fascist movements include the Iron Guard in Romania, the Blueshirts in the Irish Free State, and certain strands of Ulster loyalism, which incorporated Protestant religious rhetoric within militant unionist activism.

== United States Interest Groups ==
=== Impact of Christian Interest Groups ===
Christian interest groups have had a profound impact on the United States legislative system from the very start of the United States. While not specifically unique to Christian interest groups, some notable positions early on was lobbying against Sunday mailing and business hours as well as being firmly opposed to slavery. After the American Civil War they started to have stronger influence in U.S. politics. Such as the Women’s Christian Temperance Union pivotal and direct role in getting alcohol banned. Religious interest groups in general are distinct from other interest groups in terms that religious interest groups advocate for change on a nationwide, statewide, and local levels. While other interest groups largely focus on providing better situations for their members. With Christian interest groups there is debate on if they have more of a positive or negative impact overall. Many applaud their effort in promoting religious liberty and freedom, democratic participation, and how they advocate for moral values. While opponents criticize how they blur the lines between church and state. With the increased number of Christian interest groups, their growth in membership, and the ability to spread their message on a nationwide scale thanks to the internet their impact still plays an important role in U.S. politics.

Many issues are covered by Christian interest groups. Especially since there is Christian interest groups that align more with the Republican party, and Christian interest groups that align more with Democratic party. For most Christians the Republican party aligns most with their values, leading to more right leaning Christian interest groups than left leaning interest groups.

=== Active Catholic Interest Groups ===
==== Catholic Advocate ====
Catholic Advocate is a non-profit advocacy organization that was founded in 2007 and strives to have a stronger influence in United States politics. There mission is to inspire Catholics to be involved in politics by lending their support to politicians and laws that reinforce the views of the Catholic Church. This has come in the form of supporting candidates such as Kelly Ayotte and Marco Rubio for the U.S. Senate. As well as endorsing Teresa Collett and Jeff Landry for the U.S. House of Representatives.

Their primary focus is to promote catholic views on life and marriage. They also have an interest in pushing for Catholic views when it comes to healthcare, national security, and immigration.

==== CatholicVote.org ====
CatholicVote.org is a non-profit Political Action Committee (PAC) and advocacy group that believes that the Catholic faith's views will be beneficial for the United States. They strongly push for every Catholic in the United States to be open about their faith and stay true to the Catholic Church's teachings. They do this mainly through a strong online presence. They have a strong history of lobbying and endorsing several dozens of politicians over the course of many years. Including President Donald Trump in 2024.

Catholicvote.org advocates for a variety of different things given its strong presence in U.S. Politics. Notable examples have come in the form of speaking out against same-sex marriage in June of 2015, preceding the legalization of gay marriage in the United States. As well as using national media coverage in 2009 to put out commercials that had a pro-life message.

The domain name was initially held by the Catholic Alliance in the early 2000s. In 2002, the domain name was handed over to Larry Cirignano before it came into the possession of The Fidelis Center. The domain name transferred hands for the last time when it was given to a related group called the Fidelis.

=== Active Non-Denominational Interest Groups ===
==== Christian Action Network (CAN) ====
Christian Action Network (CAN) was founded in 1990 by Martin Mawyer with the principles of promoting family, religious and traditional values. They are dedicated to educating people on Christian and American values in an effort to preserve America's moral and religious roots. They pursue this agenda by educating people through news stories on their website, holding public speaking engagements, working with other organizations, and using several other forms of media.

==== Christian Coalition of America ====
Christian Coalition of America is a grassroots conservative advocacy group that centers around promoting family values. They promote these values through several different mediums at local, state and federal levels. This includes lobbying their perspective in legislative establishments, protesting and speaking out publicly, and guiding fellow Christians through training and information.

Founded in 1989 by Pat Robertson they quickly rose to prominence with their vocal outreach. This vocal outreach has drawn a lot of attention over the years, especially in the late 1990's. Supporters praise them in their effort to promote religious and moral values. While opponents say they blur the lines between Church and State.

==== Christian Democrats of America (CDA) ====
Founded by Christina Forrester, Christian Democrats of America (CDA) aims to blend Christian values with the ideology of the Democratic party. While not focusing on any one or two specific issues they intend to provide a platform for Christian Democrats. As well advocating for people to be compassionate, loving, and service orientated like Jesus Christ in politics and in their daily lives.

Christian Democrats of America have endorsed a numerous number of candidates over the years. These endorsements include Joe Biden and Kamala Harris for President in 2020 and 2024 respectively. As well as Alexandria Ocasio-Cortez for U.S. House, Mark Kelly and John Fetterman for U.S. Senate, and Josh Shapiro for governor of Pennsylvania.

==== Young Women's Christian Association (YWCA) ====
Young Women's Christian Association (YWCA) is an interest group that advocates and fights for women, girls, and marginalized communities on all levels of government. They are also dedicated to promoting social justice issues and protecting women and children. Right now, their attention is in fighting for gender equity and racial justice.

Young Women's Christian Association has been around for 165 years and in that time has established a presence across several local communities in many states and in the District of Columbia. Among other services, they provide a numerous number of ways to keep millions of women, girls, and families safe and cared for.

== See also ==
- Caesaropapism
- Catholic Church and politics in the United States
- Christian communism
- Christian democracy
  - Distributism
  - Social credit
- Christian left
- Christian libertarianism
- Christian pacifism
- Christian Reconstructionism
- Christian republic
- Christian right
- Christian socialism
- Doctrine of the two kingdoms
- Dominion Theology
- European Christian Political Party
- Integralism
- Judaism and politics
- Liberation theology
- Political Catholicism
- Political theology
- Progressive Christianity
- Religion in politics
- Symphonia (theology)
- Temporal power of the Holy See
