= W. T. P. Simarmata =

Indonesian theologian and politician (1954–2022)

Willem T.P. Simarmata
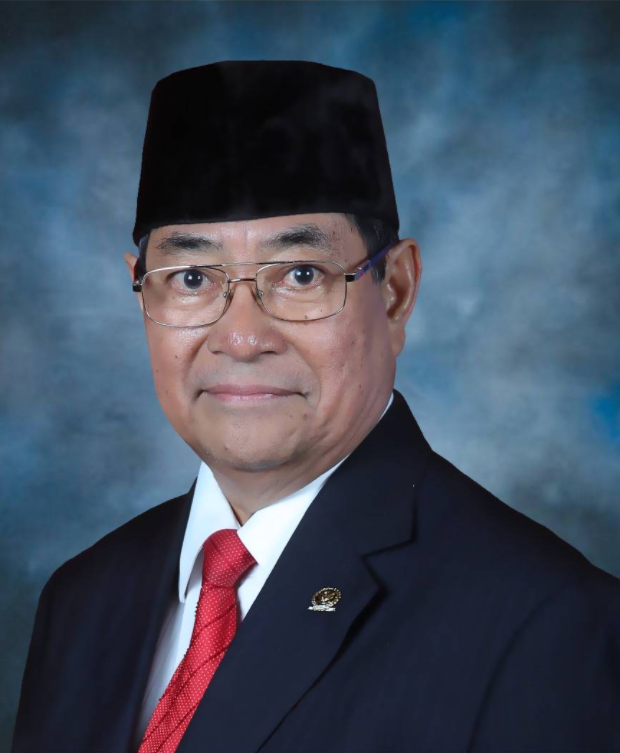
- Rev. Dr. Willem Simarmata as a Member of the Regional Representative Council (2019–2024)

Regional Representative Council of the Republic of Indonesia
- In office 1 October 2019 – 17 June 2022
- Succeeded by: Faisal Amri (interim)

15th Ephorus of HKBP
- In office 2012–2016
- Preceded by: Bonar Napitupulu
- Succeeded by: Darwin Lumbantobing

Personal details
- Born: July 4, 1954 Simarmata, Samosir, North Tapanuli, North Sumatra
- Died: June 17, 2022 (aged 67) Columbia Asia Hospital, Medan, North Sumatra
- Resting place: Simarmata, Samosir, North Sumatra
- Spouse: H. Lersiani Purba
- Children: 5
- Education: HKBP Nommensen University; Silliman University
- Alma mater: HKBP Theological Seminary

Willem Tumpal Pandapotan Simarmata (4 July 1954 – 17 June 2022) was an Indonesian politician. He served in the Regional Representative Council from 2019 to 2022 representing North Sumatra. Simarmata died in Medan on 17 June 2022 at the age of 67.

== Early life and career ==
Before running in the legislative election, Willem Simarmata had held many important positions in the HKBP, including serving as the head of the church as Ephorus. Other positions he held include leading the Christian Conference of Asia based in Chiang Mai, Thailand. This organization is composed of 122 churches from various countries. Simarmata was also actively involved in the United Evangelical Mission and since 2016 was appointed by the General Assembly as one of its moderators. Simarmata resigned in 2020.

== Death ==
Willem Simarmata passed away on 17 June 2022 at Columbia Asia Hospital in Medan, North Sumatra. At the end of his life, he left behind a wife and five children.

== Electoral history ==
Election	Legislative body	Electoral district	Votes received	Result
2019	Regional Representative Council	North Sumatra	803,638	Elected

He received the highest number of votes in the election, with a total of 803,638 votes.
