= Darwin Lumbantobing =

Ephorus (Emeritus) Darwin Lumbantobing The Right Reverend
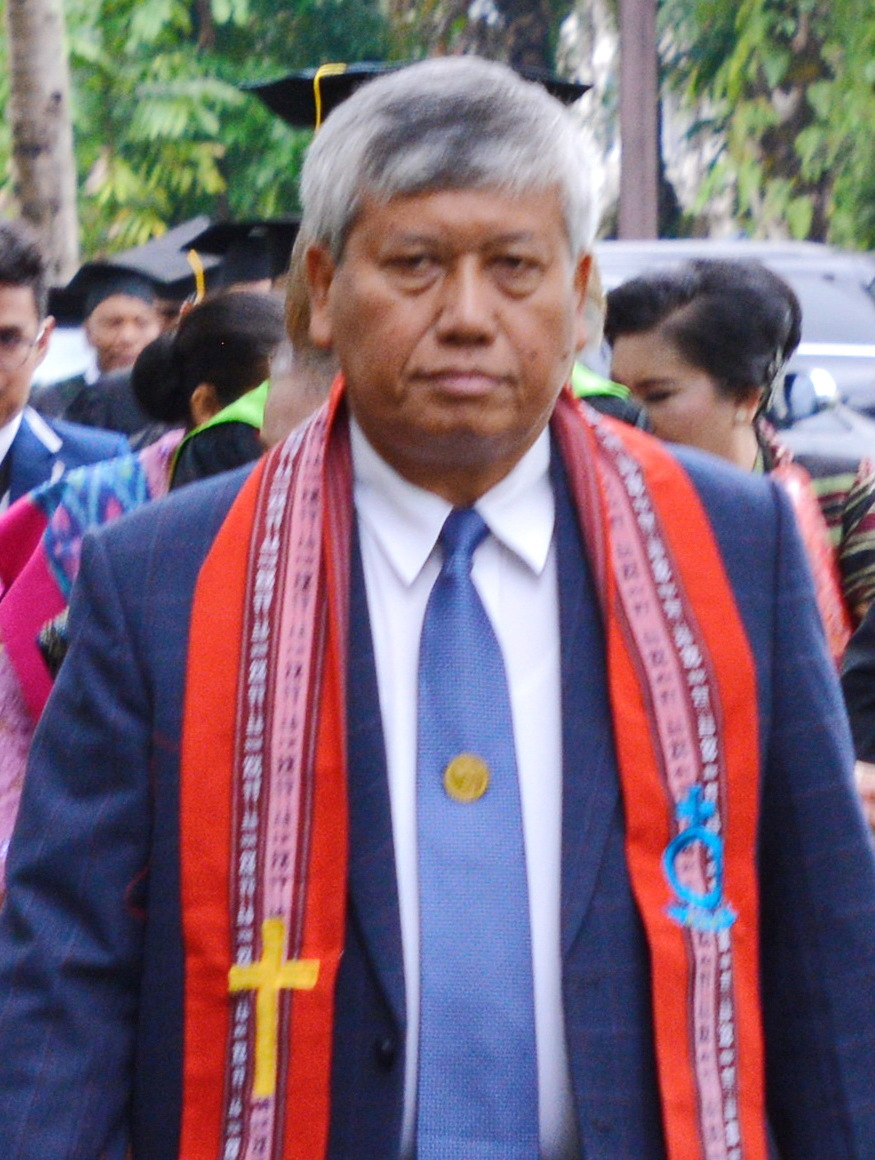
- Lumbantobing in 2019

16th Ephorus of HKBP
- In office September 15, 2016 – September 19, 2020
- Preceded by: Willem Tumpal Pandapotan Simarmata
- Succeeded by: Robinson Butarbutar

Personal details
- Born: August 22, 1956 (age 69) Kisaran, Asahan Regency. North Sumatra, indonesia
- Spouse: Mantasia Br. Siahaan
- Children: Izry Naomi Lumbantobing; Adventus Wijaya Lumbantobing; Gracia Octaveni Lumbantobing; Nathan Polindo Lumbantobing

Darwin Lumbantobing (born 22 August 1956) is an Indonesian religious leader, public speaker, and author who served as the 16th Ephorus of Huria Kristen Batak Protestan (HKBP), a Protestant Christian denomination in Indonesia from 2016 to 2020. He was succeeded by Robinson Butarbutar

== Early life and education ==
Lumbantobing was born in the city of Rawang, North Sumatra, Indonesia. He was raised in a Christian family and was heavily influenced by his faith from a young age. He received his education in local schools and later studied theology at a seminary in STT HKBP Nommensen Pematangsiantar. He graduated with honors.

== Career ==
After completing his studies, Lumbantobing began working as a pastor within the BCPC. He quickly progressed through the ranks and was appointed as the Ephorus of the church in 2016. As Ephorus, Lumbantobing was responsible for overseeing the spiritual and administrative aspects of the HKBP. He is also actively involved in community outreach and social welfare programs. Under Lumbantobing's leadership, the HKBP has seen growth in terms of membership and influence. He has received recognition for his contributions to the HKBP and society at large. In addition to his work within the HKBP, Lumbantobing is also a public speaker and author. He has written several books on theology and spiritual development. Lumbantobing has received several awards and accolades in recognition of his contributions to the BCPC and society as a whole. He is considered to be one of the most influential leaders in the Christian community in Indonesia.
