= HKBP Crisis =

The HKBP (Huria Kristen Batak Protestan) Crisis was a six-year crisis that began as internal conflict within the HKBP General Synod on 23–28 November 1992 and lasted until the Reconciliation General Synod on 18–20 December 1998.

The internal conflict resulted in competing leaders of HKBP. It was split between the independent Rev. Dr. S. A. E. Nababan, who had been elected as Ephorus in 1987, and Rev. Dr. P. W. T. Simanjuntak, who was elected as the pro-government Ephorus through the Special General Synod in 1993. The crisis ended after the Reconciliation General Synod in 1998 elected Rev. Dr. J. R. Hutauruk's as the new Ephorus, thus ending the crisis.

It was alleged that the government of Indonesia, under Suharto, commanded Maraden Panggabean to intervene in the crisis because of the influence of HKBP in the Batak people.

The crisis also resulted in the breakup of some of the HKBP churches throughout Indonesia. The most affected ones were the churches of HKBP Bandung, HKBP Pondok Bambu, HKBP Salemba (now HKBP Diaspora), and HKBP Kebayoran.
