= P. W. T. Simanjuntak =

Indonesian Lutheran prelate (1935–2021)

Ephorus (Emeritus) P. W. T. Simanjuntak The Right Reverend
- 12th Ephorus of HKBP
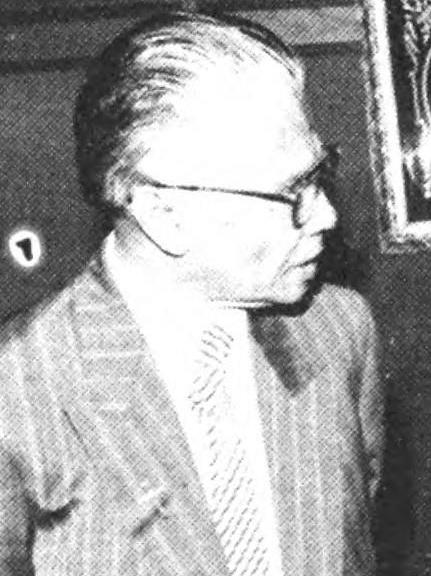
- Church: HKBP
- In office: 17 February 1993 - 1 November 1998
- Predecessor: S. A. E. Nababan
- Successor: J.R. Hutauruk
- Opposed to: S. A. E. Nababan

Member of the People's Representative Council
- In office 1 February 1967 – 28 October 1971
- Parliamentary group: Indonesian Christian Party (Christian prelates)

Personal details
- Born: 16 July 1935 North Sumatra, Dutch East Indies
- Died: 30 May 2021 (aged 85) Jakarta, Indonesia
- Denomination: Protestantism (Lutheranism)
- Parents: Cyrellus Simanjuntak
- Spouse: Mutiara Flora Napitupulu (m. 1964)

Parlindungan Wilfritz Togar Simanjuntak (16 July 1935 – 30 May 2021) was an Indonesian Lutheran minister. He was a member of the People's Representative Council from 1967 until 1971 and the Ephorus (chairman) of the Batak Christian Protestant Church (HKBP) from 17 February 1993 to 1 November 1998.

== Early life ==
Parlindungan was born on 16 July 1935 in Sidikalang, Dairi, as the son of Cyrellus Simanjuntak. Cyrellus was a priest in the Batak Christian Protestant Church and one of the first disciples of Ludwig Ingwer Nommensen.

At the age of two and a half years old, Parlindungan suffered a severe disease that caused his skin to be covered in boils. Cyrellus then prayed and stated that he would make his son a "servant to God" if he recovered from the disease. Parlindungan recovered from the disease several days later.

== Evangelical career ==
Parlindungan was consecrated as a HKBP pendeta (reverend) on 22 June 1958 and graduated from the Pematangsiantar Theological School with a degree in theology in 1961. He began his career as a reverend at HKBP Jakarta until 1965.

Parlindungan was appointed a member of the People's Representative Council on 27 January 1967, representing Christian prelates. He was sworn in as a member five days later. He and three other Christian prelates in the council later joined the Indonesian Christian Party parliamentary group. His term as a member ended when the council was dissolved and replaced by a new one on 28 October 1971. He then attended the University of Hamburg and graduated in 1973 with a doctorate in theology.

In 1979, Parlindungan was reprimanded by the ephorus of HKBP at that time, G. H. M. Siahaan, due to alleged misconduct. He left the church and was employed at the Agency for the Assessment and Application of Technology in Jakarta until 1981. He then went to West Germany and conducted missionary work for two years. He resumed his evangelical career in 1990 as a lecturer at the Pematangsiantar Theological School.

== Ephorus of HKBP ==
=== Background ===
Parlindungan's predecessor as Ephorus, S. A. E. Nababan, was elected as ephorus at its 48th Sinode Godang on 31 January 1987. S. A. E. Nababan's continual dispute with his former rivals and his stance against the government led to a conflict between him and the government-backed opposition group. The opposition group teamed up with the government to foil the 51st Sinode Godang, which was held to elect a new Ephorus. The 51st Sinode Godang ended up in chaos and failed to elect a new Ephorus, paving the way for a government takeover. The military authorities, who were called the Bakorstanasda (Regional Stability Coordinating Body), appointed S. M. Siahaan as the acting Ephorus. S. M. Siahaan was tasked to organize an extraordinary Sinode Godang to elect a government-approved Ephorus.

=== Election ===
The extraordinary Sinode Godang was held in February 1993 and was attended by 447 out of the 562 prelates who were invited. Parlindungan and six puppet candidates were nominated for the Ephorus seat. At the election of 12 February, Simanjuntak obtained 406 votes, while the rest only got between one and three votes. Another election was held to elect the secretary-general and S. M. Siahaan received the majority of votes for that position. The two were sworn into office on 17 February.

=== Dispute and reconciliation ===
The previous ephorus, S. A. E. Nababan, and his followers—who constituted most of the HKBP's congregations—refused to recognize the leadership of Parlindungan over HKBP, causing a split inside the church. International organizations recognized S. A. E. Nababan as the legitimate Ephorus instead of Parlindungan.

The split finally ended on 1 November 1998 when a neutral-acting Ephorus named J.R. Hutauruk was appointed. Parlindungan and S. A. E. Nababan handed over their offices to J.R. Hutauruk therefore ending the split on paper. It would take several more years to resolve the split in reality.

== Family ==
Parlindungan was married to Mutiara Flora Napitupulu on 16 July 1964. The couple had two children.

== Death ==
Parlindungan died on 30 May 2021 in the Jakarta Cikini Hospital.

== Bibliography ==
- Boangmanalu, J., ed. (2008), Praeses Pdt. Cyrellus Simanjuntak: pendidik, misionaris, dan motivator (in Indonesian), BPK Gunung Mulia, ISBN 978-979-687-543-6
- Aritonang, Jan Sihar; Steenbrink, Karel Adriaan (2008), A History of Christianity in Indonesia, Brill, ISBN 978-90-04-17026-1, JSTOR 10.1163/j.ctv4cbgb1
- Nadeak, Moksa; Manurung, Saut; Situmeang, Sabar; Gultom, Gomar; Butarbutar, Robinson; Sihombing, Mori; Sirait, Saut (1995), Krisis HKBP: Ujian Bagi Iman & Pengamalan Pancasila, Biro Informasi HKBP, ISBN 978-979-95010-0-4
