= Nommensen HKBP University =

University in North Sumatera, Indonesia

Coordinates: 3°35′47″N 98°40′53″E

- Universitas HKBP Nommensen
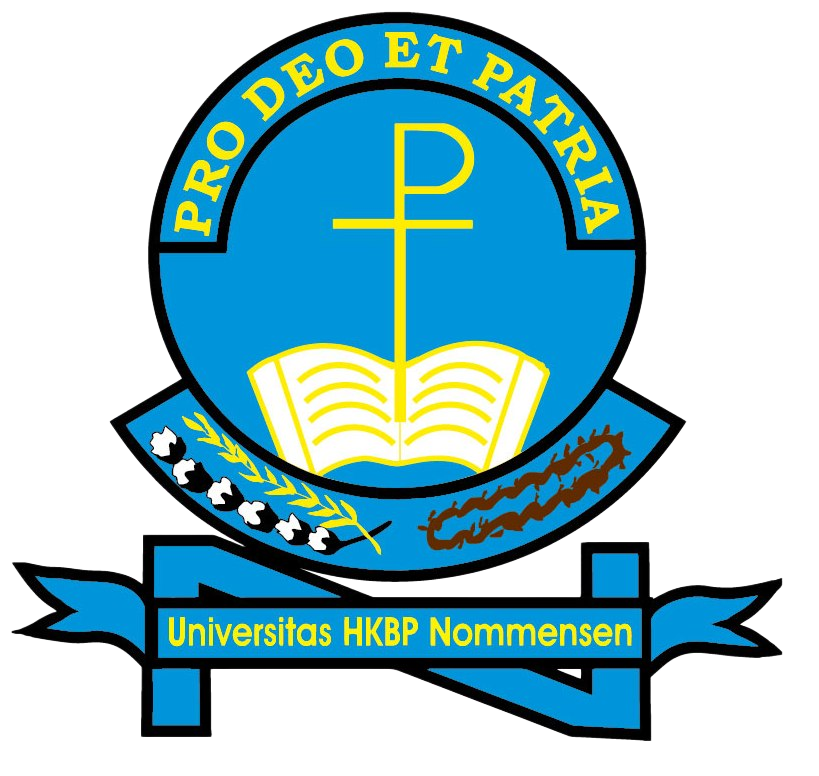
- Motto: Pro Deo et Patria
- Motto in English: For God and Country
- Type: Private
- Established: 1954
- Affiliations: Protestant
- Rector: Dr. Richard A.M. Napitupulu, M.T. (Medan area); Dr. Muktar B. Panjaitan, M.Pd. (Pematang Siantar area)
- Academic staff: 345 (2021-2022)
- Students: 11.385 (2021-2022)
- Postgraduates: 85
- Location: Medan & Pematang Siantar, North Sumatra, Indonesia
- Campus: Urban
- Colours: Prussian blue
- Website: http://www.uhn.ac.id/

Nommensen HKBP University (Indonesian: Universitas HKBP Nommensen), abbreviated as UHN, is an Evangelical Lutheran private university with campuses located in Medan and Pematang Siantar, North Sumatra, Indonesia. The university belongs to Batak Christian Protestant Church (HKBP) and is named after the German Lutheran missionary Ludwig Ingwer Nommensen from the Rhenish Missionary Society.

== History ==
Nommensen University in Pematangsiantar, North Sumatera (1969).

The idea for a university was first floated during the 1952 General Synod of the HKBP. After two years of preparation, the university was inaugurated on the premises of the former Pantoan Hospital in the highland town of Pematangsiantar on 7 October 1954 with three faculties; Law, Economics, and Theology; and an enrolment of 36 students.

In 1955, the law faculty was closed due to the lack of teaching staff and was re-opened in 1980 in the Medan city campus. In 1978, the theological faculty was separated from the university and re-organised as the HKBP Theological Institute (Indonesian: Sekolah Tinggi Theologia HKBP)

== Academics ==
Universitas HKBP Nommensen offers the following academic programs in either their Medan or Pematangsiantar campuses :

=== Medan area ===
==== Medicine ====
The latest established faculty is Medicine. It was established on July 11, 2008 and started to receive students in 2009.

==== Law ====
One of the first faculties established during the founding of the university in 1954, the faculty was closed after less than a year of operations due to the lack of teaching staff. The faculty was re-opened in 1980. It offers a single study program with the option of three concentrations; Civil law, Criminal law, and Administrative law. The faculty is accredited B by BAN-PT.

==== Economics ====
One of the first faculties established during the founding of the university in 1954. The faculty offers study programs in Accountancy, Management, and Economics & Development Studies. All the study programs have been accredited B by BAN-PT.

==== Social and Political Sciences ====
The faculty was established in 1961 and offers study programs in Public Administration, Business Administration, and Secretarial Studies. All the study programs have been accredited B by the BAN-PT.

==== Teachers Training and Education ====
The faculty was established in 1962 and offers study programs in Education and Pedagogic Studies with concentrations in English language, Indonesian, Mathematics, and Physical Education. All study programs have been accredited B by BAN-PT.

==== Engineering ====
The faculty was established in 1975 and offers study programs in Civil Engineering, Mechanical Engineering, and Electronic Engineering. All the study programs have been accredited B and C by the BAN-PT.

==== Animal Husbandry ====
The faculty was established in 1976 and offers study programs in Livestock Production, Livestock Nutrition and Fishery Cultivation. The study program has been accredited B by BAN-PT.

==== Agriculture ====
The faculty was established in 1984 and offers study programs in Agronomy (now Agroecotechnology), Agricultural Economic Sociology, and Agricultural Technology. All study programs have been accredited B by BAN-PT.

==== Languages and Arts ====
The faculty was established in 1987 and offers study programs in the English Language and Music. The music major has been accredited B by BAN-PT and the English Language major has also been accredited B by BAN-PT.

==== Psychology ====
The faculty was established in 2001 and offers a single study program in Psychology. The study program has been accredited B by BAN-PT.

==== Postgraduate Studies ====
The faculty was established in 2003 and offers two study programs: Master of Management (MM) and Master Education and pedagogic in English language.

=== Pematang Siantar area ===
==== Teachers training and education ====
The faculty was established in 1962 and offers study programs in Education and Pedagogic Studies with concentrations in English language, Indonesian, German language, Accountancy, Civics Education, Christian Studies, Mathematics, and Physical Education.

== See also ==
- List of universities in Indonesia
