= North Tapanuli Regency =

Regency in North Sumatra, Indonesia

Coordinates: 2.0028°N 99.0707°E

North Tapanuli Regency Kabupaten Tapanuli Utara
- Regency
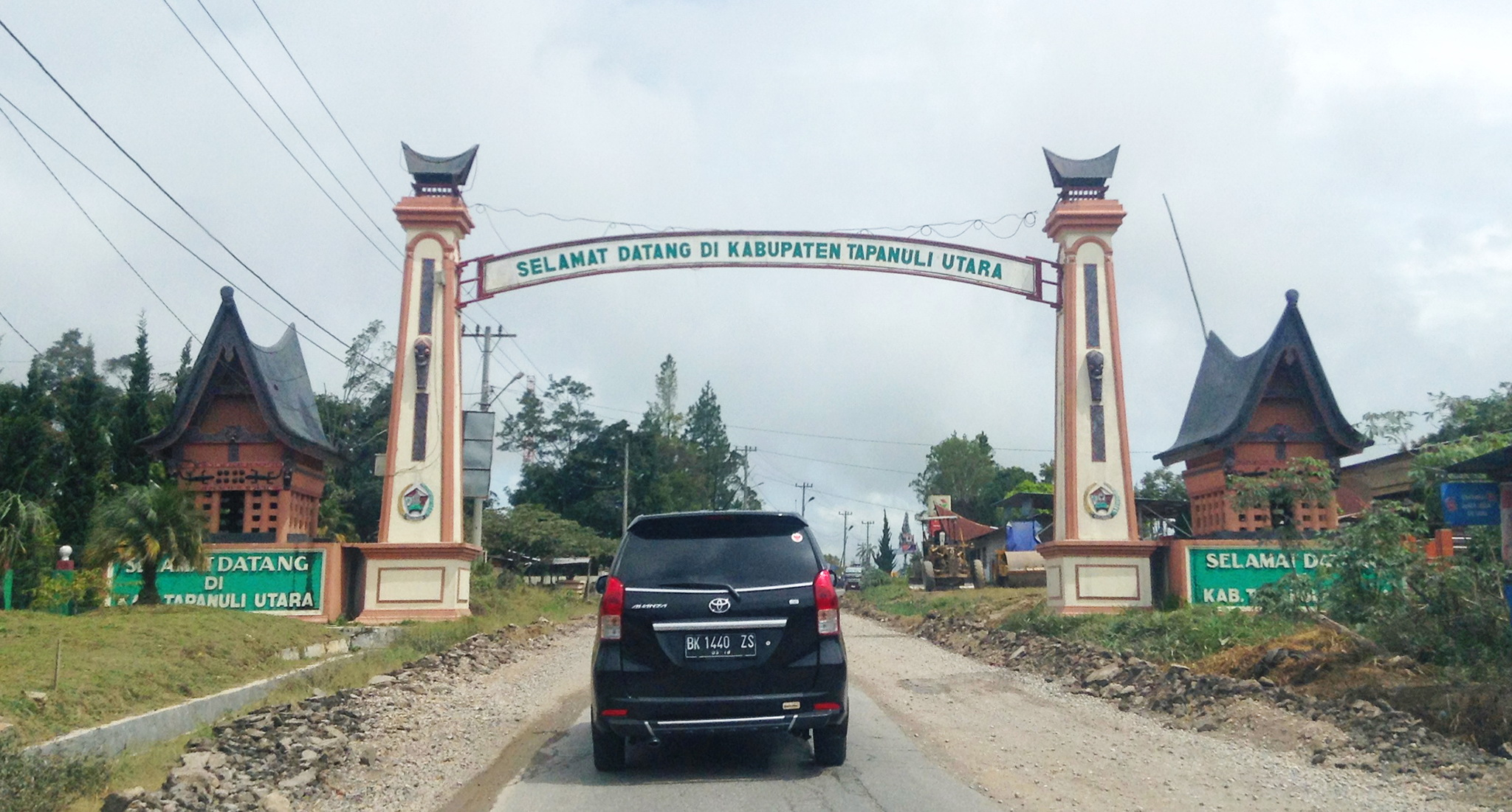
- Welcome gate to North Tapanuli Regency in Siborongborong

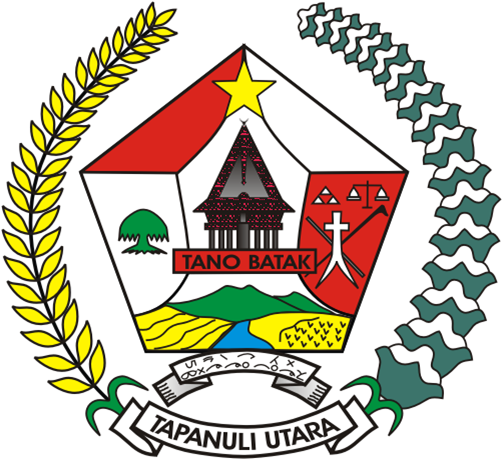
- Seal
- Motto: Tano Batak ("Land of Batak")
- Country: Indonesia
- Province: North Sumatra
- Regency seat: Tarutung

Government
  - Regent: Jonius Taripar Parsaoran Hutabarat
  - Vice Regent: Deni Lumbantoruan
  - Chairman of Regency's Council of Representatives: Poltak Pakpahan (PDI-P)
  - Vice Chairpeople of Regency's Council of Representatives: Fatimah Hutabarat (Nasdem) and Reguel Simanjuntak (Golkar)

Area
  - Total: 3,793.71 km^{2} (1,464.76 sq mi)

Population (mid 2025 estimate)
  - Total: 333,690
  - Density: 87.959/km^{2} (227.81/sq mi)
- Time zone: UTC+7 (WIB)
- Website: www.taputkab.go.id

North Tapanuli Regency (Tapanuli Utara - in Indonesian, "Utara" means "North") is a landlocked regency in North Sumatra province, Sumatra, Indonesia. Its capital is Tarutung. The regency covers an area of 3,793.71 square kilometers and it had a population of 278,897 at the 2010 Census and 312,758 at the 2020 Census; the official estimate as of mid 2025 was 333,690 (comprising 165,309 males and 168,381 females).

== Administrative districts ==
The regency is divided into fifteen districts (kecamatan), tabulated below with their areas and their populations at the 2010 Census and the 2020 Census, together with the official estimates as of mid 2025. The table also includes the locations of the district administrative centres, the number of administrative villages in each district (totalling 241 rural desa and 11 urban kelurahan), and its postcode.

Kode Wilayah	Name of District (kecamatan)	Area in km^{2}	Pop'n Census 2010	Pop'n Census 2020	Pop'n Estimate mid 2025	Admin centre	No. of villages	Post code
12.02.11	Parmonangan	257.35	13,021	14,578	15,499	Manalu	14	22453
12.02.03	Adiankoting	502.90	13,876	15,109	15,479	Adiankoting	16	22461
12.02.04	Sipoholon	189.20	22,265	24,156	26,034	Sipoholon	14 ^{(a)}	22452
12.02.01	Tarutung	107.68	39,500	42,831	44,947	Tarutung	31 ^{(b)}	22411: 22417^{(c)}
12.02.02	Siatas Barita	92.92	13,063	14,197	15,552	Simorangkir	12	22417: 22419
12.02.05	Pahae Julu	165.90	11,740	13,494	14,356	Onan Hasang	19 ^{(d)}	22463
12.02.06	Pahae Jae	203.20	10,569	12,092	12,355	Pasar Sarulla	13 ^{(d)}	22465
12.02.08	Purbatua	191.80	7,164	8,168	8,576	Parsaoran Janji; Angkola	11	22464
12.02.07	Simangumban	150.00	7,300	8,369	8,622	Aek Nabara	8	22466
12.02.13	Pangaribuan	459.25	26,751	29,765	31,930	Pakpahan	26	22472
12.02.14	Garoga	567.58	15,581	18,214	19,554	Garoga Sibargot	13	22473
12.02.12	Sipahutar	408.22	24,536	27,828	29,878	Sipahutar	25	22471
12.02.09	Siborongborong	279.91	44,170	50,641	55,080	Pasar; Siborongborong	21 ^{(d)}	22474
12.02.10	Pagaran	138.05	16,539	18,795	20,175	Sipiltak	14	22458
12.02.15	Muara ^{(e)}	79.75	13,182	14,521	15,653	Hutana; Nagodang	15	22476
	Totals	3,793.71	279.257	312,758	333,690	Tarutung	252	

Note: (a) including the kelurahan of Situmeang Habinsaran. (b) including 7 urban kelurahan - Hutatoruan V, Hutatoruan VI, Hutatoruan VII, Hutatoruan IX, Hutatoruan X, Hutatoruan XI and Partali Toruan.
(c) except for the two desa of Jambur Nauli and Sihujur, which have the postcode of 22452. (d) including one kelurahan - the named district administrative centre.
(e) Muara District is a northern near-exclave of the regency, mainly situated on the southern shore of Lake Toba and connected to Siborongborong District by a narrow strip of land.
It includes the island of Pulau Sibandang (12 km^{2} in area, with 2,357 inhabitants in 2020), which is situated in the lake.

== Soda Pond ==
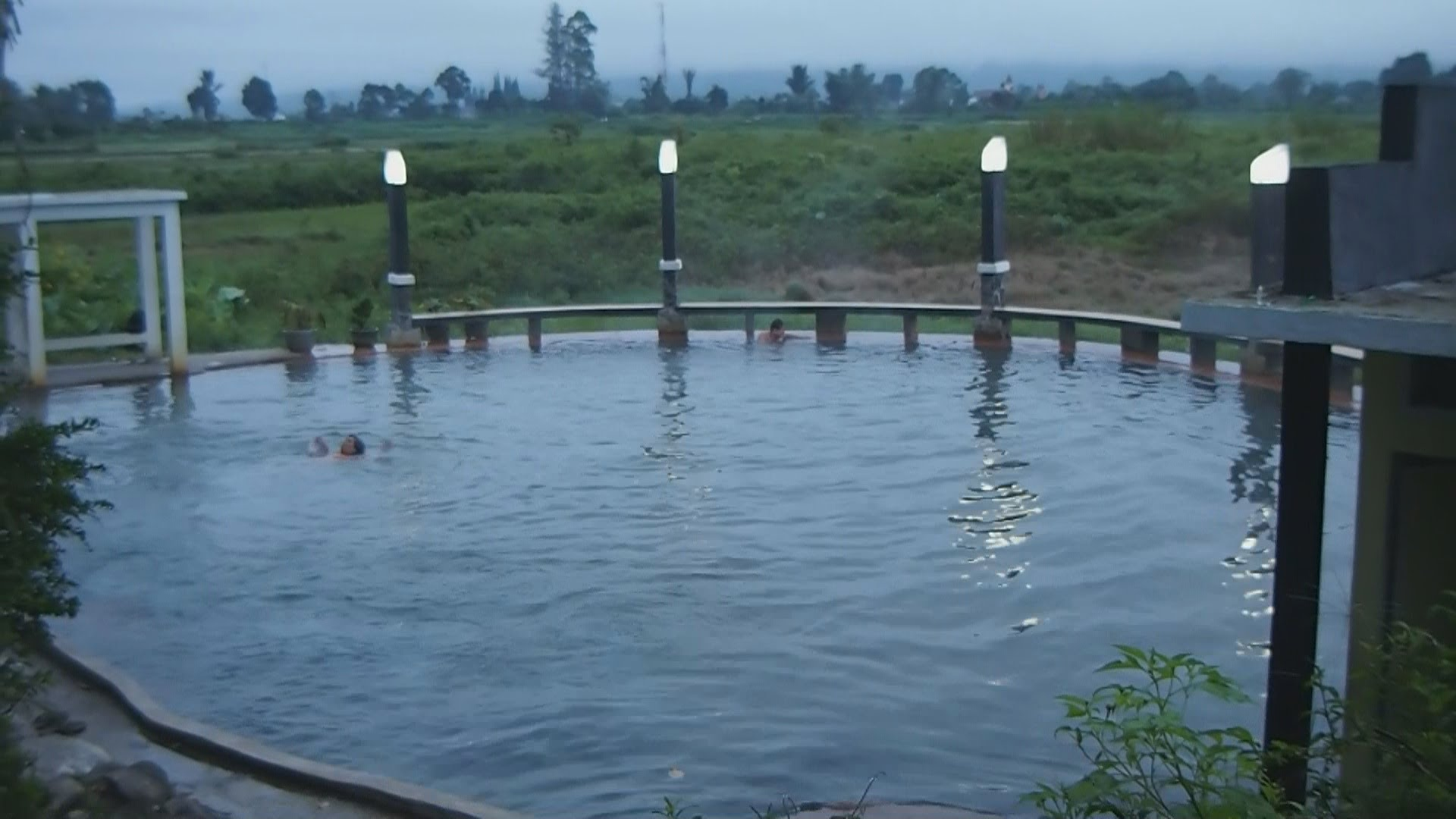
Soda Pond or Aek Kara is located at the bottom of Parbubu I Hill village

Soda Pond, or Aek Rara / Air Soda is located at the bottom of Parbubu I Hill village. The pond's natural spring water generates bubbles and a soda aroma can be smelled. It is safe for swimming, but the use of goggles is recommended. The locals regularly use the water from the pond to water nearby rice paddy fields.
