= Tarutung =

Capital of North Tapanuli Regency in North Sumatra Province, Indonesia

Tarutung Taroetoeng
- Town and District
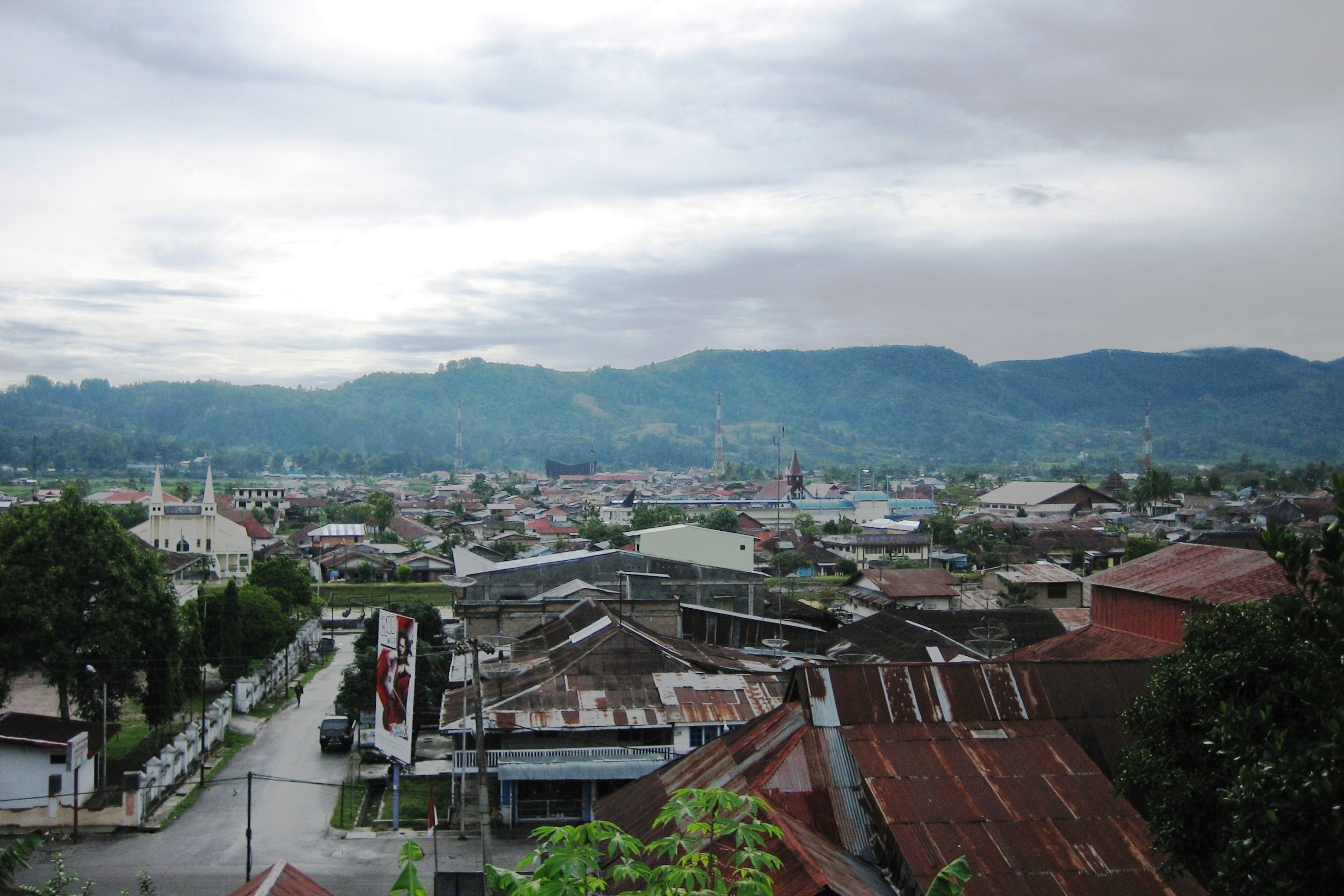
- The town of Tarutung

- Location within Sumatra
- Coordinates: 2°01′N 98°58′E
- Country: Indonesia
- Province: North Sumatra
- Regency: North Tapanuli

Government
  - Camat: Renhart Doharta Lumbantobing

Area
  - Total: 107.68 km^{2} (41.58 sq mi)

Population (mid 2025)
  - Total: 45,130
  - Density: 419.1/km^{2} (1,085/sq mi)
- Time zone: UTC+7 (WIB)

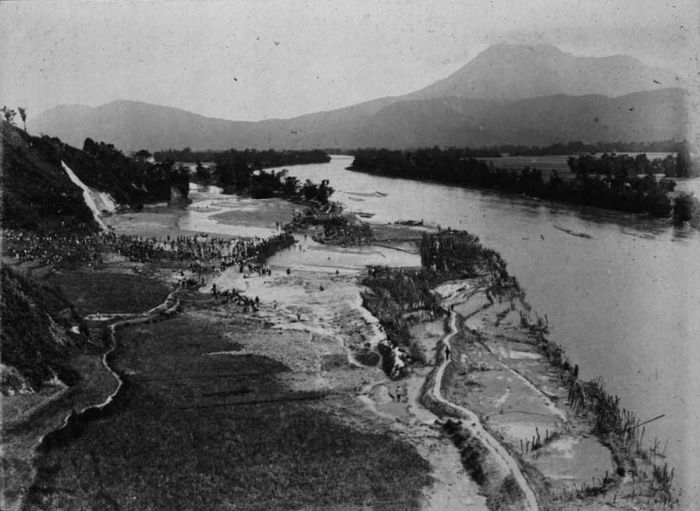
A flood of Silindoeng (the Silindung Valley) at Tarutung in 1917.

Tarutung (Dutch: Taroetoeng) is an administrative district (kecamatan), town and the administrative capital (Regency seat) of North Tapanuli Regency (Kabupaten Tapanuli Utara), North Sumatra, Sumatra, Indonesia.

Tarutung in the Batak language means "durian" and town was named after the durian trees that grow there. The town (as defined comprising the 7 urban kelurahan) had 16,635 inhabitants as at mid 2025.

== Villages ==
Tarutung District comprises the following 31 villages, of which 7 are classed as urban kelurahan (these are indicated by asterisks * following their name in the following table) and 24 as rural desa. They are listed below (with their populations as at mid 2025).

- Siandor-andor (583)
- Hutapea Banuarea (1,067)
- Parbubu Pea (701)
- Parbubu II (719)
- Parbubu Dolok (1,183)
- Hutatoruan VIII (566)
- Parbubu I (1,331)
- Hutatoruan I (2,042)
- Sosunggulon (1,308)
- Parbaju Toruan (1,455)
- Hapoltahan (1,363)
- Hutatoruan IV (1,198)
- Aek Sian Simun (1,374)
- Hutatoruan V * (732)
- Hutatoruan VI * (730)
- Hutatoruan XI * (1,464)
- Hutatoruan IX * (1,274)
- Hutatoruan X * (3,973)
- Hutatoruan VII * (5,721)
- Partali Toruan * (2,743)
- Parbaju Tonga (1,140)
- Simamora (2,440)
- Hutagalung Siwaluompu (1,720)
- Siraja Oloan (1,315)
- Hutauruk (692)
- Parbaju Julu (1,400)
- Partali Julu (1,492)
- Sitampurung (1,037)
- Jambur Nauli (1,389)
- Sihujur (582)
- Hutatoruan III (396)
- Total Tarutung (45,130)

Sihujur and Hutatoruan III desa are in the far north, almost separated from the rest of the district.
