= List of people from North Sumatra =

This is the list of notable people born in or notable for their association with North Sumatra, Indonesia.

== A ==
- Taufik Akbar, engineer and former astronaut candidate (Medan)
- Sutan Takdir Alisjahbana, writer (Natal)
- Peter Alma, Dutch artist (Medan)
- Kelvin Anggara, gold medal recipient in International Chemistry Olympiad (Medan)
- Chairil Anwar, poet (Medan)
- Joko Anwar, movie director (Medan)
- Zainul Arifin, politician (Central Tapanuli Regency)
- Kenny Austin, model and actor who was Mister International 2015 Top 10 (Medan)

== B ==
- Patuan Besar Ompu Pulo Batu, better known as Sisingamangaraja XII, the last priest-king of Batak people (North Tapanuli Regency)
- Cosmas Batubara, politician, chairman and the co-founder of KAMI (Simalungun Regency)
- Gita Bhebhita, comedian (Medan)
- Muhammad Rizky Billar, actor (Medan)
- Kasma Booty, Malaysian actress (Kisaran)

== C ==
- Jenny Chang, actress (Medan)
- Ishak Charlie, entrepreneur (Medan)

== D ==
- Dhalia, actress (Medan)
- H.S. Dillon, assistant to the Minister of Agriculture, Commissioner of the National Commission on Human Rights (Medan)

== E ==
- Arizal Effendi, diplomat (Medan)

== F ==
- Tjong A Fie, businessman and banker (Medan)

== G ==
- Djamin Ginting, national hero (Karo Regency)
- Lyodra Ginting, singer who previously won Indonesian Idol Season 10 (Medan)

== H ==
- Tengku Amir Hamzah, poet and national hero (Langkat)
- Burhanuddin Harahap, 9th Prime Minister of Indonesia (Medan)
- Rinto Harahap, musician (Sibolga)
- Sunaryati Hartono, attorney, professor of law and government official (Medan)
- Cornelis August Wilhelm Hirschman, Dutch banker and co-founder of FIFA (Medan)
- Hotman Paris Hutapea, lawyer (Laguboti)

== I ==
- Nazril Irham, rock star, lead singer vocalist of multiplatinum band Peterpan (Langkat Regency)
- Mohamad Isa, first governor of South Sumatra (Binjai)
- Willem Iskander, writer and teacher (Mandailing Natal Regency)

== J ==
- Kimmy Jayanti, model and actress (Medan)
- Mawar Eva de Jongh, actress (Medan)
- John Juanda, professional poker player (Medan)

== K ==
- Malam Sambat Kaban, forestry minister of Indonesia since 2001 (Binjai)
- Jan van Breda Kolff, (Medan)
- Rudy Kousbroek, Dutch poet, translator, writer and first of all essayist (Pematangsiantar)
- D. Kumaraswamy, Hindu reformer and Tamil community leader (Medan)
- Lindswell Kwok, former Wushu practitioner and athlete (Binjai)

== L ==
- Yasonna Hamonangan Laoly, Minister of Law and Human Rights of Indonesia (2019–present) (Central Tapanuli Regency)
- Bernard Lievegoed, Dutch medical doctor, psychiatrist and author (Medan)
- Jesslyn Lim, model and presenter (Medan)
- Ferdinand Lumban Tobing, former Indonesian Minister of Manpower and Transmigration (Sibolga)

== M ==
- Adam Malik, Indonesia's third vice president, diplomat, and journalist (Pematangsiantar)
- El Manik, actor (Langkat Regency)
- Markus Haris Maulana, footballer (Langkat Regency)
- Anton Medan, former robber and gambling tycoon who converted to Islam and became a preacher in 1992 (Tebing Tinggi)
- Cut Ratu Meyriska, actress (Medan)

== N ==
- Abdul Haris Nasution, Indonesian general who was twice appointed Army Chief of Staff and who escaped an assassination attempt during the 1965 coup attempt by 30 September Movement (Mandailing Natal Regency)
- Diana Nasution, pop singer (Medan)
- Walle Nauta, leading neuroscientist (Medan)
- Lily Neo, Singaporean medical practitioner and politician (Medan)
- Indah Nevertari, singer who previously won Rising Star Indonesia (season 1) (Medan)
- Tengku Erry Nuradi, 17th Governor of North Sumatra (Medan)
- Rizal Nurdin, 14th and 15th Governor of North Sumatra (Medan)

== P ==
- Luhut Binsar Pandjaitan, politician and businessman (Toba Samosir Regency)
- Sanusi Pane, writer and journalist (Mandailing Natal Regency)
- Maraden Panggabean, prominent Indonesian General during the early years of General Suharto's New Order regime (North Tapanuli Regency)
- Olo Panggabean, businessman (Tarutung)
- Donald Izacus Panjaitan, Indonesian general who was killed during a kidnap attempt by members of the 30 September Movement (Toba Samosir Regency)
- Dinda Permata, singer and musician (Medan)
- Ariska Putri Pertiwi, Miss Grand International 2016 (Medan)
- Sisworo Gautama Putra, film director and screenwriter (Asahan)

== R ==
- Legimin Raharjo, footballer (Medan)
- Musa Rajekshah, vice governor of North Sumatra from 2018 to 2023 (Medan)
- Erika Remberg, Austrian film actress (Medan)
- Melaney Ricardo, actress and presenter (Medan)
- Helvy Tiana Rosa, playwright and writer (Medan)

== S ==
- Dita Indah Sari, trade union and socialist activist (Medan)
- Ratna Sarumpaet, human rights activist (Tarutung)
- Raline Shah, actress and model (Medan)
- Judika Nalon Abadi Sihotang, singer who was a runner-up in Indonesian Idol Season 2 (Sidikalang)
- Putri Ayu Silaen, singer (Sibolga)
- Duma Riris Silalahi, actress and singer (Medan)
- Alfred Simanjuntak, composer (North Tapanuli Regency)
- Cornel Simanjuntak, composer (Pematangsiantar)
- T.B. Simatupang, soldier who was the chief of staff of the Indonesian National Armed Forces (Sidikalang)
- Maria Simorangkir, singer who previously won Indonesian Idol Season 9 (Medan)
- Linton Sirait, District Court judge in Bali (Medan)
- Arifin Siregar, banker and politician (Medan)
- Merari Siregar, writer, author of the first novel written in Indonesian (South Tapanuli Regency)
- Raja Inal Siregar, governor of North Sumatra from 1988 to 1998 (Medan)
- Sori Siregar, writer (Medan)
- Paulo Sitanggang, footballer (Deli Serdang)
- Putri Mentari Sitanggang, doctor and Puteri Indonesia North Sumatra 2017 (Medan)
- Ruhut Sitompul, lawyer, politician, and actor (Medan)
- Amir Sjarifuddin, socialist politician and one of the Indonesian Republic's first leaders (Medan)
- Albern Sultan, model and actor who was Mister International 2013 1st runner up (Medan)
- Ahmad Suradji, serial killer (Medan)

== T ==
- Achmad Tahir, former Ministry of Tourism and Creative Economy of Indonesia (Kisaran)
- Sofyan Tan, doctor and politician (Medan)
- Akbar Tanjung, politician who is a former chairman of Golkar party (Sibolga)
- William Tanuwijaya, entrepreneur and co-founder of Tokopedia (Pematangsiantar)
- Muhammad Ihsan Tarore, singer who previously won Indonesian Idol Season 3 (Medan)
- Gordon Tobing, singer (Medan)

== V ==
- Ben Verweij, Dutch football (soccer) player (Medan)

== W ==
- Hendry Wijaya, pianist (Medan)
- Rini Wulandari, singer who previously won Indonesian Idol Season 4 (Medan)

== Y ==
- Teddy Yip, Dutch national who was a Formula One team owner in the 1970s (Medan)
