= Harahap =

Harahap is an Indonesian surname that may refer to the following notable people:

- Abdul Hakim Harahap (1905–1961), Indonesian politician
- Amir Sjarifuddin Harahap (1907–1948), Indonesian politician and journalist
- Basyral Hamidy Harahap (1940–2015), Indonesian writer and humanist
- Burhanuddin Harahap (1917–1987), Indonesian politician and lawyer
- Cico Harahap (born 1978), Malay-Indonesian actor
- Hasjrul Harahap (1931–2014), Indonesian politician and government official
- Marah Halim Harahap (1921–2015), Indonesian general, politician, and governor
- Mulfachri Harahap (born 1966), Indonesian politician and lawyer
- Parada Harahap (1899–1959), Indonesian journalist
- Rahudman Harahap (born 1959), Indonesian politician and civil servant
- Rinto Harahap (1949–2015), Indonesian singer-songwriter
- Syamsul Anwar Harahap (born 1952), Indonesian boxer
- Usra Hendra Harahap (born 1959), Indonesian diplomat and former Air Force flag officer
- Yahya Harahap (1934-2024), Indonesian jurist
