= Siregar =

Siregar is one of Batak clans originating in North Sumatra, Indonesia. Notable people of this clan include:

- Ali Yusuf Siregar (born 1961), Indonesian politician, Regent of Deli Serdang (2023–2024)
- Arifin Siregar (1934–2019), Governor of the Bank Indonesia and Minister of Trade
- Bakri Siregar (1922–1994), Indonesian socialist literary critic and writer
- Bismar Siregar (1928–2012), former Judge Supreme Supreme Court
- Chairuddin Siregar (born 1929), Indonesian footballer
- Donny Fernando Siregar (born 1982), Indonesian footballer
- Ersa Siregar (1951–2003), Indonesian journalist working for RCTI
- Ghozali Siregar (born 1992), Indonesian professional footballer
- Golfrid Siregar (1985–2019), Indonesian environmental activist
- Lukman Hakim Siregar (born 1969), Indonesian diplomat
- Mahendra Siregar (born 1962), deputy foreign minister in Indonesia
- Melanchton Siregar (1912–1975), co-founder and last chairman of the Indonesian Christian Party
- Merari Siregar (1896–1941), Indonesian writer
- Raja Inal Siregar (1938–2005), governor of North Sumatra
- Rendy Siregar (born 1986), Indonesian professional footballer
- Sofjan Saury Siregar (1951–2017), Indonesian religious scholar and presidential contender
- Sori Siregar (born 1939), Indonesian writer
- Zivanna Letisha Siregar (born 1989), Indonesian talk show host, book writer, philanthropist, model

== See also ==
- Baharuddin Siregar Stadium, multi-use stadium in Lubuk Pakam, Deli Serdang Regency, North Sumatra, Indonesia
