= Sipirok =

District in South Tapanuli Regency, North Sumatra, Indonesia

Coordinates: 1°37′N 99°16′E

Sipirok Sipirok
- Town and District
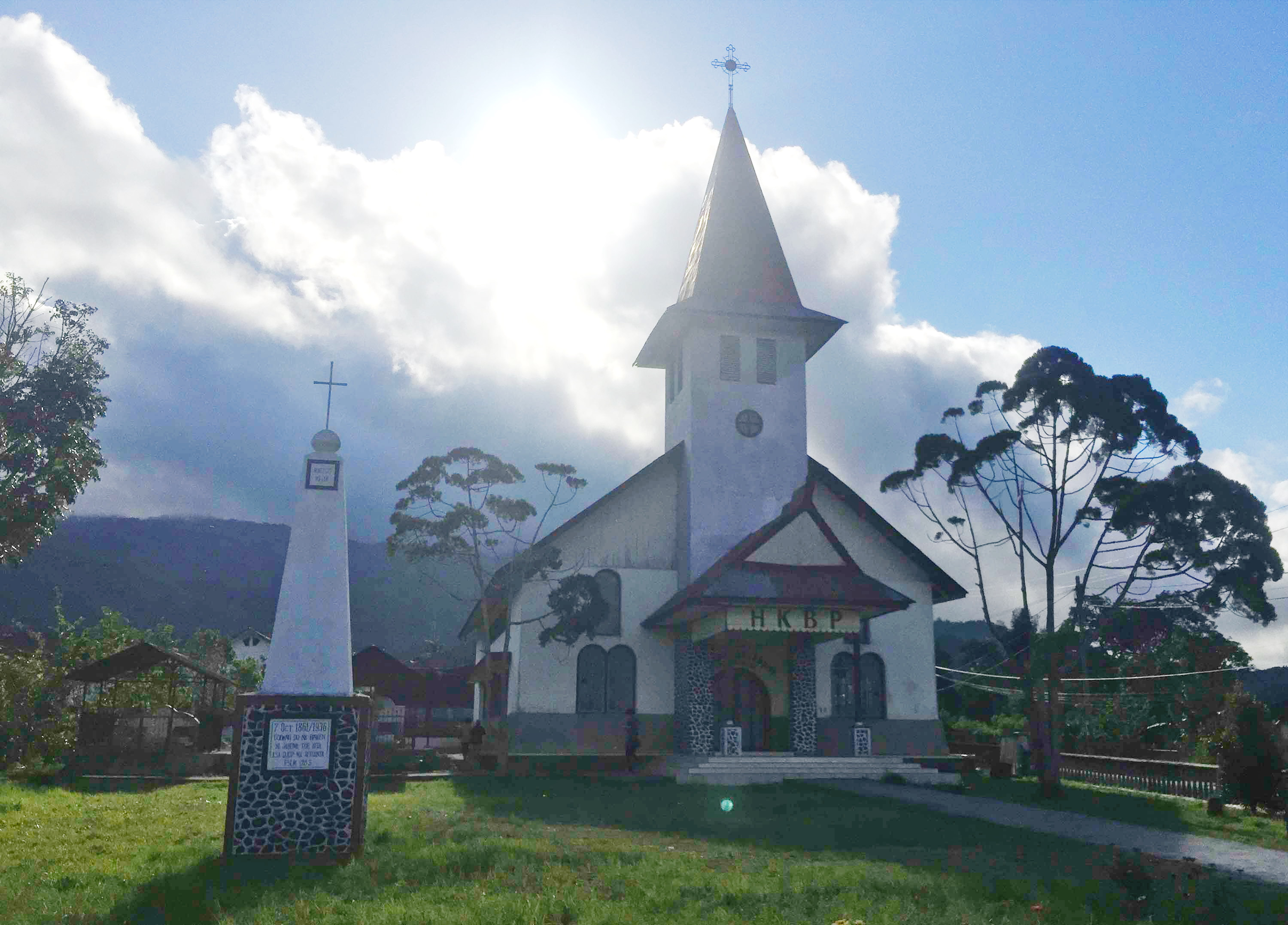
- Great mosque of Sipirok HKBP Sipirok church

- Location of Sipirok in South Tapanuli Regency
- Country: Indonesia
- Province: North Sumatra
- Regency: South Tapanuli Regency

Area
  - Total: 409.37 km^{2} (158.06 sq mi)

Population (mid 2025 estimate)
  - Total: 15,420
  - Density: 37.67/km^{2} (97.56/sq mi)
- Time zone: UTC+7 (WIB)
- Website: www.sipirok.tapselkab.go.id

Sipirok is a town in North Sumatra province of Indonesia and the seat (capital) of South Tapanuli Regency. Sipirok, located in the Sibualbuali highlands, along the Barisan Mountains range, has a deeply rich history rooted in the Batak Angkola ethnic group. Sipirok known for its premium Arabica coffee, its distinct handwoven textiles (Tenun Sipirok), and its beautiful volcanic landscapes.

== Etymology ==
According to oral traditions within the community, the name "Sipirok" is believed to have originated from the name of a tree called "Sipirdot" (Pirdot)—a type of tree that grew abundantly in the Sibualbuali highlands. Over time, the word "Sipirdot" underwent a transformation, becoming "Sipirok", a name now used to identify both the local community and the region itself.

The earliest modern documentation recording the toponymic evolution of "Sipirdot" is found in Dutch military logs dating from 1834 to 1837, wherein military clerks recorded the phonetic variant "Siepierok." These logs were subsequently leaked and published under the spelling "Sipirok" in the Nederlands Oost-Indische Besittingen newspaper on 6 September 1838, and in the Algemeen Handelsblad on 7 September 1838. The records were later officially compiled in the seventh volume of the Dutch army journal, Tijdschrift voor het Nederlandsche Leger (Militaire Spectator), published in 1841.

== History ==
Sipirok in 1937

=== Indigenous Angkola Sovereignty (1500s-1820s) ===
It was claimed that the first settlers was Batak people from Siregar clan, migrants moved from Muara (Lake Toba) via Sibatang Kayu to establish the foundations of Sipirok since ~1500s (historically linked to Tano Ulayat Sipirdot under the Harajaon Natolu system). These settlers and their descendants became the branch (sub-ethnic) of Batak as Batak Angkola.

Local Batak Angkola chieftains (Raja-Raja Adat) governed Sipirok under the traditional kinship system known as Dalihan Na Tolu. The region featured traditional stilt houses (Bagas Godang) and relied on indigenous agrarian practices.

=== The Padri War & Islamic Expansion (1820–1835) ===
The Wahhabite-inspired Padri movement from West Sumatra, led heavily by Tuanku Rao, expanded northward into the Mandailing and Angkola territories. Through this turbulent period, large-scale mass conversions took place, firmly rooting Islam within the socio-political structures of the local Angkola leadership.

=== The Colonial Era (1833–1942) ===
==== Dutch Military Incursion (1833) ====
The broader Dutch colonial expansion into the Tapanuli region started when Netherlands forces, led by Major Eiler, landed at the port of Natal and advanced inland in 1833. Shortly after, troops under Colonel Elout built Fort Elout in Mandailing. This outpost was specifically intended as a military base to launch subsequent operations into the Angkola and Sipirok areas.

==== The Coffee Boom (1835) ====
Following the introduction of Arabica seeds from Java into the Tapanuli region in 1835, the fertile volcanic highlands of Sipirok were transformed into a primary node for colonial coffee exploitation.

In 1839, under the rule of the Siregar Angkola Dolok Kingdom, coffee plants were introduced to the fertile highlands surrounding the Sibualbuali volcano. Sipirok quickly became a vital center for Arabica coffee production and a key trading hub with the Dutch East Indies authorities.

==== Economic and Administrative Control (1840) ====
The Dutch consolidated their presence by establishing structural colonial policies. To expand coffee production under the colonial economic system, the Dutch colonial government constructed a government coffee warehouse and established formal coffee seeding farms directly in Sipirok by 1840.

==== Formal Governance (1850s) ====
Under the Dutch colonial decree Staatsblad van Nederlandsch-Indië No. 59 of 1852 dated 21 October 1852—the official name of the administrative area was Subdivision / Subdistrict of Angkola (Onderafdeeling Ankola). Under this specific 1852 statutory decree, the town name "Sipirok" was not written as an independent standalone administrative zone in the primary law text. The legal script categorized the Sipirok area within the sub-district borders of the Subdivision of Angkola (Onderafdeeling Ankola), which was placed directly inside Division / District of Mandailing and Angkola (Afdeeling Mandheling en Ankola) under the over-arching Tapanuli Residency (Residentie Tapanoeli).

The traditional local aristocracy (anak raja) formalized strategic alliances with the Dutch civil administration during the 1850s, marking the stabilization of effective colonial rule over the Sipirok high country.

==== The Cradle of Batak Christianity (1860s) ====
Church of the Rhenish Mission Society at Boengabondar near Sipirok north of Padangsidimpoean (ca.1910)

Sipirok holds a monumental place in the history of Christianity in the Batak region. On 26 January 1857, Dutch missionary Gerrit van Asselt from Ermelo Mission (Ermelo Zending), arrived in Sipirok, marking the definitive introduction of Christianity to the Batak lands. He established the area's first zending school in Sipirok.

In 1861, missionaries from the German Rhenish Missionary Society (Rheinische Missionsgesellschaft or RMG) Johann Carl Klammer and Wilhelm Heine arrived after being expelled due to a rebellion in Borneo. They met with Gerit van Asselt and Friedrich Wilhelm Betz from Ermelo, who later also joined the RMG. They founded some of the earliest congregations in the Batak lands, such as the HKBP Sipirok Church in 1861 and the early community at Parau Sorat. These pioneers also followed by the prominent Ludwig Ingwer Nommensen who arrived in Sipirok in 1862, and later led the expansion from Sipirok into the Batak inland regions. The RMG also building the healthcare expansion around 1914; the missionaries established an auxiliary hospital (Zendings hulpziekenhuis) to service the subdepartment of Sipirok.

==== Dutch Administrative Post (1875) ====
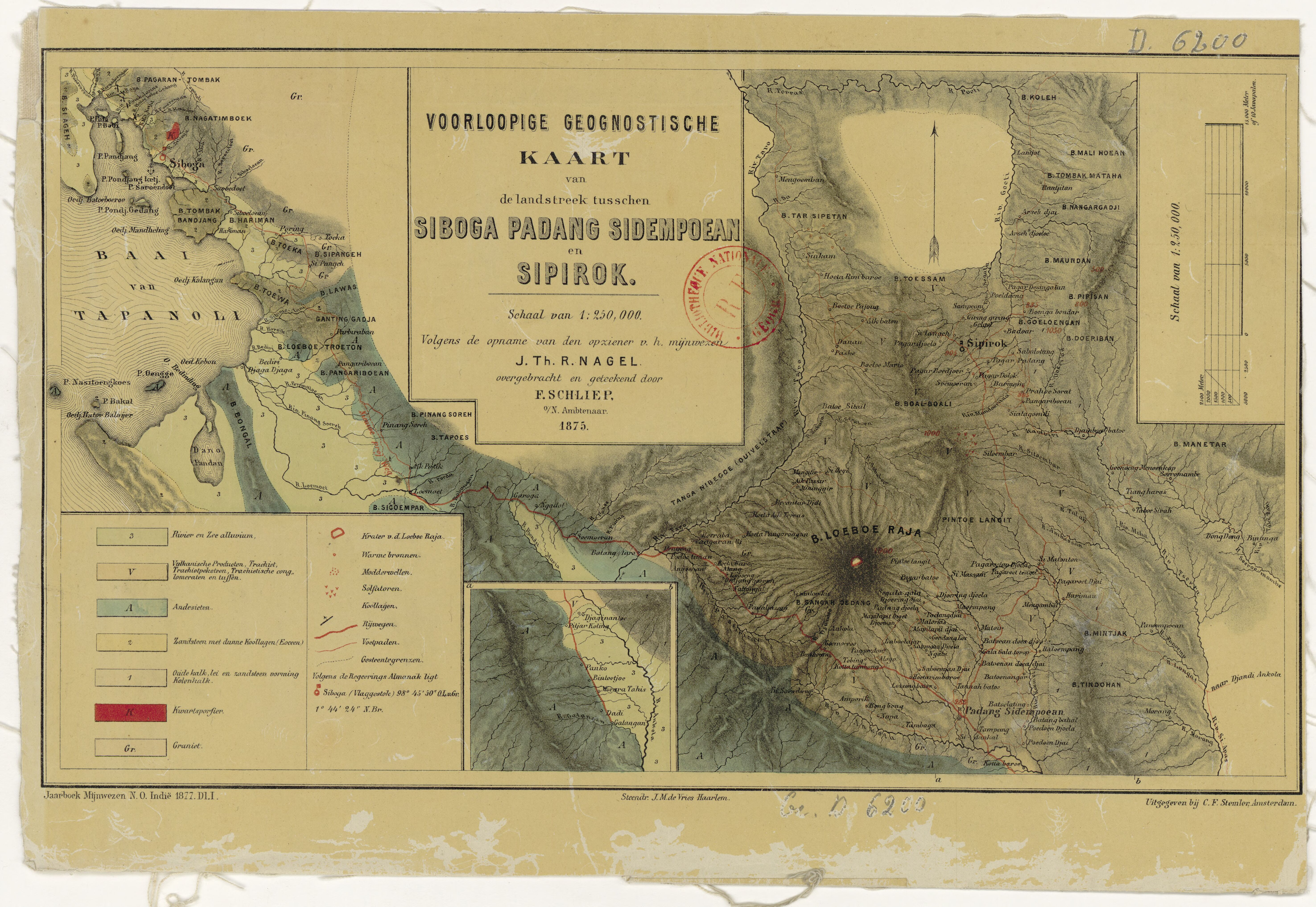
Provisional geognostic map of the region between Siboga, Padang Sidempoean and Sipirok. 1/250,000 : according to the survey by the mining inspector / J. Th. R. Nagel ; transferred and drawn by F. Schliep, former Dutch official. 1875

Following Dutch pacification, the colonial government established the Subdivision / Subdistrict of Mandailing and Angkola (Onderafdeeling Afdeeling Mandheling en Ankola). Due to its growing strategic economic value, followed by the formal separation of the independent Subdivision / Subdistrict of Sipirok (Onderafdeeling Sipirok) on 11 February 1875, via Staatsblad No. 2 governed by a Dutch Comptroller (Controleur) W.A. Henny.

In 1886, the Dutch formalized the economic status of the town by appointing official coffee warehouse masters (koffie-inkoopakhuismeester) to manage Sipirok’s lucrative highland coffee trades.

==== Inter-Religious Unity & Anti-Colonial Nationalism (1920s–1930s) ====
While the Dutch attempted to fuel tensions between local Muslims and Christians, the community fostered deep-rooted tolerance, symbolized by the 1926 Sri Alam Grand Mosque built adjacent to the 1861 HKBP European-style church.

By 1930, nationalistic movements converged. The Christian axis (Huria Christian Batak / HKB) and the Islamic axis (Sarekat Islam / SI) joined forces in Sipirok. They successfully united citizens across different religions into a singular regional spirit against colonial rule, paving the way for other prominent socio-religious organizations like Muhammadiyah.

=== World war II (1942–1945) ===
The Japanese invaded Sipirok in 1942 during the Japanese invasion of the Dutch East Indies.

=== The National Revolution (1945–1949) ===
During the Indonesian National Revolution against returning Dutch forces, the town became a defensive stronghold. Local combatants mobilized the Angkatan Gerilya Sipirok (AGS) or Sipirok Guerrilla Force to launch guerrilla defenses throughout South Tapanuli.

=== Republic of Indonesia (1949–present) ===
==== Post-independence (1949–2001) ====
After the recognition of Indonesian independence from the Netherlands on 27 December 1949, most of the post-independence era, Sipirok was simply a sub-district (kecamatan) within the massive South Tapanuli Regency, which historically had its seat in Padangsidimpuan. It was regulated based on the Indonesian Emergency Law Number 7 of 1956, concerning: "The Establishment of Autonomous Regions of Regencies within the Province of North Sumatra" (Undang-Undang Darurat Nomor 7 Tahun 1956 tentang Pembentukan Daerah Otonom Kabupaten-Kabupaten Dalam Lingkungan Daerah Propinsi Sumatera Utara) dated 7 November 1956 issued by President Soekarno, effective date: 24 November 1956 (State Gazette Number 58 of 1956).

==== Regency Capital (2001–present) ====
After Padangsidimpuan split into an independent city municipality in 2001, Sipirok was designated as the new Capital of South Tapanuli Regency, referring to:

- Law of the Republic of Indonesia Number 37 of 2007 concerning "The Establishment of North Padang Lawas Regency" (Undang-Undang Nomor 37 Tahun 2007 tentang Pembentukan Kabupaten Padang Lawas Utara).
- Law of the Republic of Indonesia Number 38 of 2007 concerning "The Establishment of Padang Lawas Regency" (Undang-Undang Nomor 37 Tahun 2007 tentang Pembentukan Kabupaten Padang Lawas)

Article 21, Paragraph (1) in both regulations states that: "The Capital of South Tapanuli Regency, which constitutes the parent regency, is located in Sipirok."

Law Number 23 of 2014 concerning Regional Government regulated the official relocation of all major government infrastructure and administrative offices—including the Regional Secretariat and the local parliament (DPRD) offices, officially relocated from Padangsidempuan to Sipirok, to complete its transformation into the administrative heart of the regency.

Provisions regarding the location of the capital city were further strengthened through Law Number 24 of 2024 concerning South Tapanuli Regency in North Sumatra Province . Article 5 of Law No. 24/2024 explicitly and up-to-date states that the capital of South Tapanuli Regency is located in Sipirok District.

== Notable residents ==
- Hasjrul Harahap, Minister of Forestry (1993-1998)
- Mangaradja Soeangkoepon, (1885-1946) Volksraad member
- Abdul Rasjid, native physician and Volksraad member
- Ucok Baba, Indonesian actor and comedian
