= North Sumatra I (electoral district) =

Electoral district in Indonesia

- Sumatera Utara I
- Electoral district constituency for the People's Representative Council
- District: List: Regencies : Deli Serdang Regency; Serdang Bedagai Regency; Cities : Binjai; Medan
- Population: 5.364.933 (2023)
- Electorate: 3.895.322 (2024)

Current constituency
- Seats: 10
- Members: Ashari Tambunan (PKB; Ade Jona Prasetyo (Gerindra); Muhammad Husni (Gerindra); Sofyan Tan (PDI-P); Yasonna Laoly (PDI-P); Musa Rajekshah (Golkar); Maruli Siahaan (Golkar); Prananda Surya Paloh (Nasdem); Tifatul Sembiring (PKS); Muhammad Lokot Nasution (Demokrat)
- Created from: North Sumatra

North Sumatra I (Indonesian: Sumatera Utara I) is an electoral district in Indonesia. The electoral district encompasses of most of Greater Medan, which includes the regencies of Deli Serdang and Serdang Bedagai and two cities, Medan and Binjai.

Since its inception in 2004, this electoral district sent 10 members of the House of Representatives.

== Components ==
- 2004–present: Regencies of Deli Serdang and Serdang Bedagai, cities of Medan and Binjai

== List of representatives ==
The following list is in alphabetical order. Party with the largest number of members is placed on top of the list.

Election	Member	Party
2004	Antarini Malik	Golkar
2004	Serta Ginting	Golkar
2004	Irmadi Lubis	PDI-P
2004	Yasonna Laoly	PDI-P
2004	Hasrul Azwar	PPP
2004	Hasurungan Simamora	PDS
2004	Muhammad Idris Luthfi	PKS
2004	Mulfachri Harahap	PAN
2004	Yusuf Pardamean Nasution	Demokrat
2004	Zaenal Maarif	PBR
2009	Abdul Wahab Dalimunthe	Demokrat
2009	Jafar Nainggolan	Demokrat
2009	Sri Novida	Demokrat
2009	Sutan Bhatoegana	Demokrat
2009	Burhanuddin Napitupulu (2009–10) (Note: Died in office) Meutya Hafid (2010–14)	Golkar
2009	Hasrul Azwar	PPP
2009	Ibrahim Sakty Batubara	PAN
2009	Nurdin Tampubolon	Hanura
2009	Panda Nababan (2009–12) (Note: Resigned after being named a suspect in a bribery case.) Irmadi Lubis (2012–14)	PDI-P
2009	Tifatul Sembiring (2009) (Note: Appointed as Minister of Communication and Information) Muhammad Idris Luthfi (2010–14)	PKS
2014	Irmadi Lubis	PDI-P
2014	Sofyan Tan	PDI-P
2014	Hasrul Azwar (2014–19) (Note: Appointed as Indonesian Ambassador to Morocco) Hasan Husaeri (2019)	PPP
2014	Meutya Hafid	Golkar
2014	Muhammad Syafii	Gerindra
2014	Mulfachri Harahap	PAN
2014	Nurdin Tampubolon	Hanura
2014	Prananda Surya Paloh	NasDem
2014	Ruhut Sitompul (2014–16) (Note: Resigned from the party) Abdul Wahab Dalimunthe (2017–19)	Demokrat
2014	Tifatul Sembiring	PKS
2019	Hidayatullah	PKS
2019	Tifatul Sembiring	PKS
2019	Muhammad Husni	Gerindra
2019	Muhammad Syafii	Gerindra
2019	Sofyan Tan	PDI-P
2019	Yasonna Laoly (2019) (Note: Appointed as Minister of Law and Human Rights) Irmadi Lubis (2020–24)	PDI-P
2019	Abdul Wahab Dalimunthe (2019–21) (Note: Died in office) Hendrik Sitompul (2022–24)	Demokrat
2019	Meutya Hafid	Golkar
2019	Mulfachri Harahap	PAN
2019	Prananda Surya Paloh	NasDem
2024	Ade Jona Prasetyo	Gerindra
2024	Muhammad Husni	Gerindra
2024	Meutya Hafid (2024) (Note: Appointed as Minister of Communication and Digital Affairs) Maruli Siahaan (2025–)	Golkar
2024	Musa Rajekshah	Golkar
2024	Sofyan Tan	PDI-P
2024	Yasonna Laoly	PDI-P
2024	Ashari Tambunan	PKB
2024	Muhammad Lokot Nasution	Demokrat
2024	Prananda Surya Paloh	NasDem
2024	Tifatul Sembiring	PKS

== See also ==
- North Sumatra II
- North Sumatra III
- List of Indonesian national electoral districts
