= Padangsidimpuan =

City in North Sumatra, Indonesia

- City
- City of Padangsidimpuan; Kota Padangsidimpuan

Other transcription(s)
  - Batak: ᯇᯑᯰᯚᯪᯑᯪᯔ᯲ᯇᯮᯀᯉ᯲
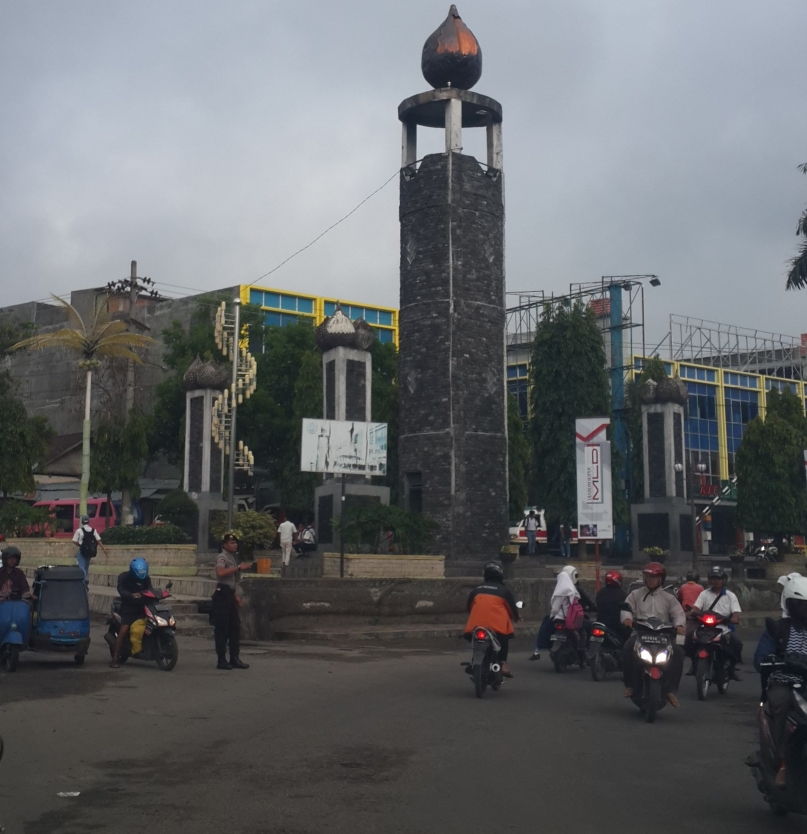
- Salak monument

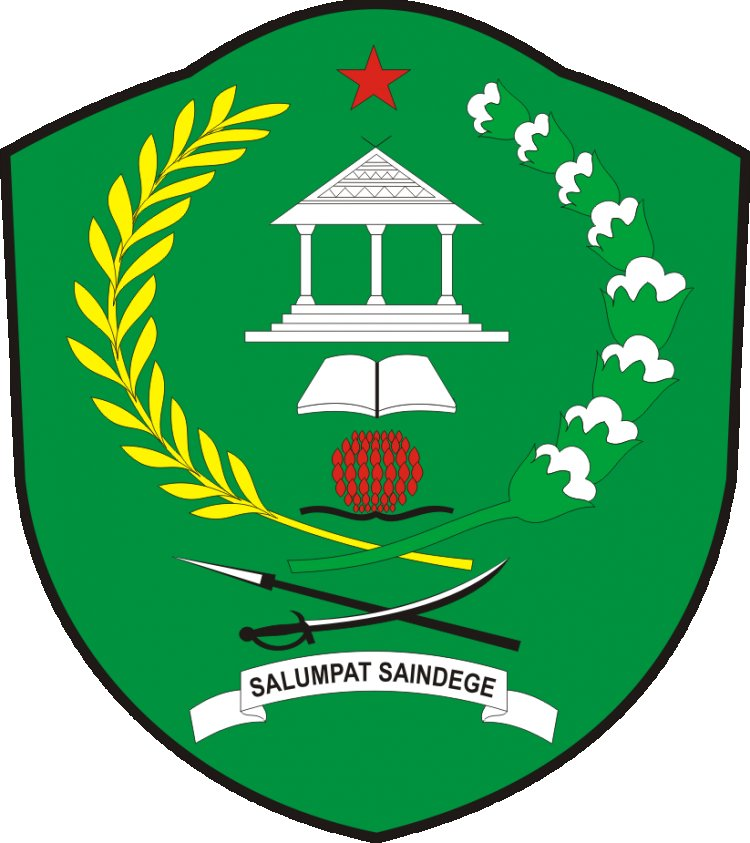
- Coat of arms
- Motto: Salumpat Saindege ("Together on one leap, one footing")
- Location within North Sumatra

- Location in Sumatra and Indonesia Padangsidimpuan (Indonesia)
- Coordinates: 1°22′43″N 99°16′20″E
- Country: Indonesia
- Province: North Sumatra
- Incorporated: 30 November 1982
- City Status: 21 June 2001

Government
  - Mayor: Letnan Dalimunthe
  - Vice Mayor: Harry Pahlevi Harahap
  - Chairman of City's Council of Representatives: Siwan Siswanto (Golkar)
  - Vice Chairmen of City's Council of Representatives: Rusydi Nasution (Gerindra) and Erwin Nasution (National Mandate Party)

Area
  - Total: 159.28 km^{2} (61.50 sq mi)

Population (mid 2025 estimate)
  - Total: 243,843
  - Density: 1,530.9/km^{2} (3,965.0/sq mi)
- Time zone: UTC+7 (Indonesia Western Time)
- Area code: (+62) 634
- Vehicle registration: BB
- Website: padangsidimpuankota.go.id

Padangsidimpuan (also known as Padang Sidimpuan) is a city in North Sumatra, Indonesia, and the former capital of South Tapanuli Regency, which surrounds the city. It covers an area of 159.28 km^{2} and had a population of 178,818 according to the 2000 Census. This increased to 191,554 in the 2010 Census and 225,105 in the 2020 Census. The official estimate as of mid 2025 was 243,843, comprising 124,153 males and 119,690 females.

Padangsidimpuan City is located 448 km from the provincial capital, Medan, and is situated in the southwestern most part of North Sumatra Province.

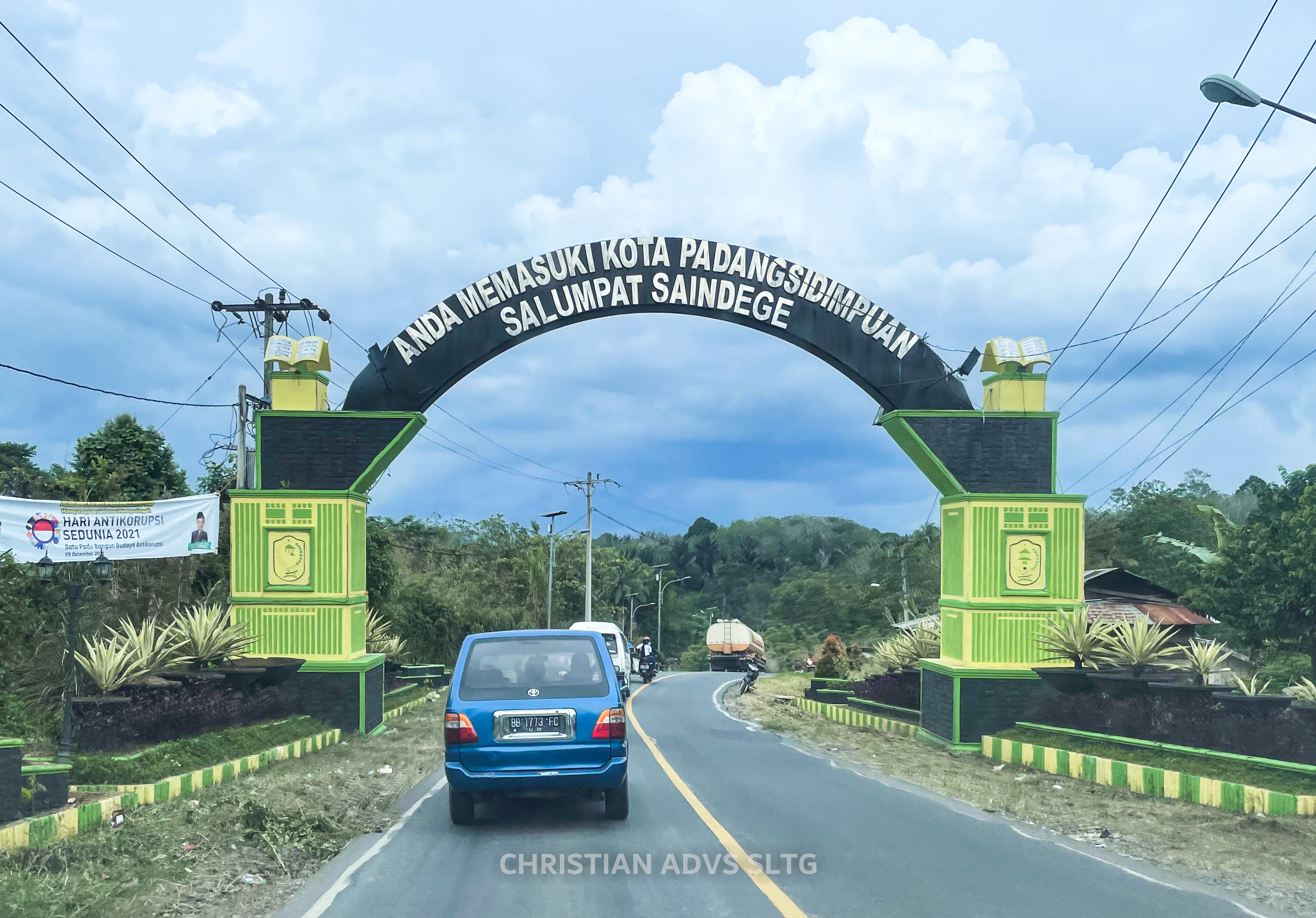
City Gate Of Padangsidimpuan between Angkola Timur district and Padangsidimpuan Batunadua district

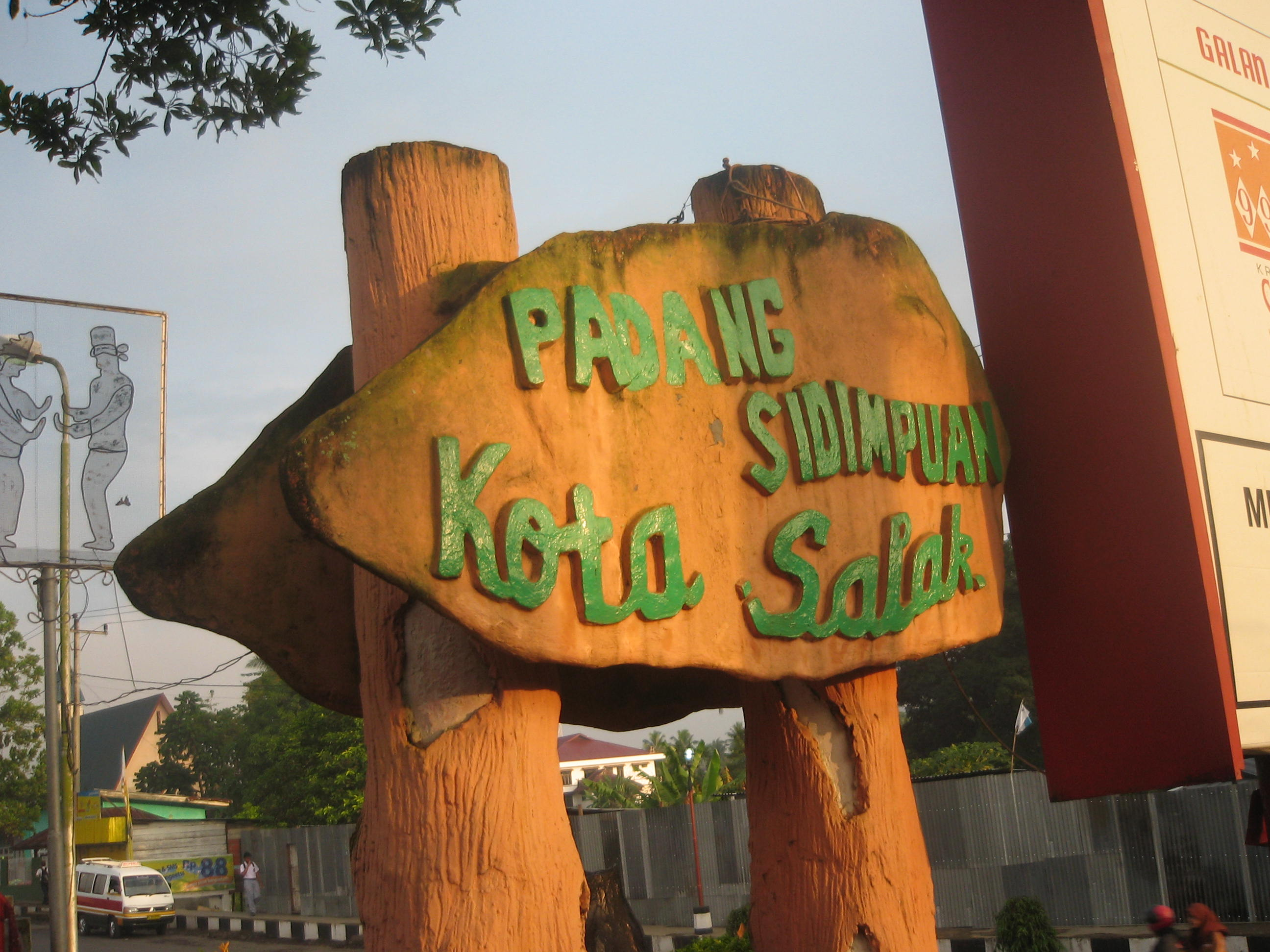
A sign with the City name

== History ==
=== Etymology and Dutch colonial rule ===
Around 1700, Padangsidimpuan was a small hamlet frequently visited by traders as a resting place. It was called "Padang Na Dimpu" in the Angkola language, where Padang means "expanse" or "wide area," na means "in," and dimpu means "high." Thus, the name can be interpreted as "a wide expanse in a high place." In ancient times, this area served as a stopover for traders from various regions, including fish and salt traders traveling the routes of Sibolga–Padangsidempuan–Panyabungan and Padang Bolak (North Padang Lawas)–Padangsidimpuan–Sibolga.

As the city developed, the Dutch Colonial Government, through Staatsblad Regulation No. 563/1937, elevated Padangsidimpuan to city status. At that time, the city was administratively divided into six Weks (Wijk in Dutch), as follows: Wek I (Kampung Marancar), Wek II (Pasar Julu), Wek III (Kampung Teleng), Wek IV (Kampung Jawa), Wek V (Pasar Siborang and Sitamiang), and Wek VI (Kampung Darek).

Over time, the city developed and became the economic center of the Tapanoeli Residency. This growth was fueled by the development of plantation industries such as rubber and coffee, as well as the trade sector, including the trading of salt (known as Sira in Angkola), fish, and other commodities from the surrounding area.

=== Indonesia Revolution 1945–1949 ===
After President Sukarno proclaimed Indonesia's independence on August 17, 1945, news of the proclamation was brought by fighters from the Sibolga area and Bukittinggi. On July 15, 1947, Vice-president Mohammad Hatta visited Padangsidimpuan as part of a working visit from Bukittinggi to Medan, during the Dutch Military Aggression, which aimed to defend the Republic of Indonesia against Operation Kraai.

After Mohammad Hatta visited Padangsidimpuan, President Sukarno visited the following year. He was warmly welcomed upon his arrival and delivered a speech at Pasar Batu and a square (now the Grand Mosque Al-Abror/New Grand Mosque). He then continued his journey to Sibolga and Tarutung.

Several months after President Sukarno's visit to Padangsidimpuan, the Dutch violated the Renville Agreement and invaded Tapanuli in the early hours of December 19, 1948. Dutch soldiers breached the status quo line in Asahan by shooting and killing members of the Security Police who were performing their duties in the Republic's security area. On that day, the Dutch army also advanced from Rantau Prapat to Wingfoot (now Kotapinang).

On September 23, 1948, the Dutch army crossed the status quo line in Ajibata at 3:00 AM, and by 5:00 AM, their troops had landed in Balige. By transporting troops via Lake Toba, the Dutch army succeeded in breaking through the T.N.I.'s defenses. Meanwhile, the Dutch deployed paratroopers at Silangit airport in Siborong-borong. By midday, the Dutch army reached Tarutung. On December 24, 1948, at 9:00 AM, the Dutch army landed troops in Sibolga. All of these operations were carried out by the Dutch, including breaking the static line at Rakjat and Ajibata Islands, disembarking troops at Silangit, and landing troops in Sibolga, with support from airplanes that dropped bombs and fired machine guns.

On January 2, 1949, Padangsidimpuan was occupied by Dutch troops. That night, the Indonesian National Armed Forces (TNI), along with local youth, launched an attack on the Dutch troops in Padangsidimpuan. After the attack, they withdrew. Through Padangsidimpuan, the Dutch army was able to advance and occupy Pijorkoling.

=== Liberation Democracy (1950-1960) ===
After the recognition of sovereignty in the Dutch–Indonesian Round Table Conference, the South Tapanuli Regency People's Representative Council was formed on March 11, 1950. This was alongside the establishment of South Tapanuli Regency, which included Mandailing Natal Regency, Padang Bolak Regency, and Padangsidimpuan Regency. The formation was later reinforced by Law No. 7 of 1956, which established a 27-member People's Representative Council with its capital in Padangsidimpuan.

=== New Order until autonomous city (1982-2001) ===
In 1982, through Government Regulation No. 32 of 1982, Padangsidimpuan's status was elevated to that of an administrative city, marking a step toward becoming an autonomous city. It consisted of two sub-districts: South Padangsidimpuan and North Padangsidimpuan.

== Geography ==
Padangsidimpuan is a medium-sized city located in North Sumatra Province, southeast of Sibolga. The city was established in 2001 through Law Number 04 of 2001, which pertains to the formation of Padangsidimpuan City. Geographically, Padangsidimpuan is situated between 01º 08' 00" and 01º 28' 00" North Latitude and between 99º 13' 00" and 99º 20' 00" East Longitude. It has a tropical climate, with an average temperature ranging from 22.5 °C - 24 °C. The city is surrounded by several hills and is crossed by numerous rivers and streams. Padangsidimpuan stretches from northwest to southeast in the valley of Mount Lubuk Raya, part of the Bukit Barisan ridge, and features a mix of hills and lowlands, with elevations ranging from 260 metres to 1,100 metres above sea level.

The topography of the area is characterized by a valley surrounded by the Barisan Hills, giving the Padangsidimpuan city area the appearance of a basin resembling a lake when viewed from a distance. The highest peaks of the hills and mountains surrounding the city are Mount Lubuk Raya and Bukit (Tor) Sanggarudang, which are located side by side to the north of the city.

One of the notable hills in Padangsidimpuan is Bukit (Tor) Simarsayang. Several rivers flow through the city, including the Batang Ayumi River, Aek Sangkumpal Bonang (which is also the name of a shopping center in the city center), Aek Rukkare (which joins Aek Sibontar), Aek Batangbahal, and Aek Batang Angkola. The latter flows along the southern and southwestern boundaries of the city, meeting Aek Sibontar near Naposo Stadium.

== Administrative districts ==
The city is divided into six districts (Indonesian: kecamatan), listed below with their names (Pandangsidimpuan is abbreviated to "PS") along with their areas, populations from the 2010 and 2020 Censuses, and official estimates as of mid 2025. The table also includes the locations of the district administrative centers, the number of administrative villages in each district (totaling 37 urban kelurahan and 42 rural desa ), and their post codes.

| Kode Wilayah | Name of District (kecamatan) | Area in km^{2} | Pop'n Census 2010 | Pop'n Census 2020 | Pop'n Estimate mid 2025 | Admin centre | No. of kelurahan | No. of desa | Post codes |
|---|---|---|---|---|---|---|---|---|---|
| 12.77.05 | PS Tenggara (Southeast PS) | 37.70 | 29,810 | 34,043 | 36,393 | Pijor Koling | 2 ^{(a)} | 16 | 22730 |
| 12.77.02 | PS Selatan (South PS) | 19.26 | 61,064 | 69,105 | 73,549 | Ujung Padang | 12 ^{(b)} | - | 22721 -22728 |
| 12.77.03 | PS Batunadua | 41.81 | 18,396 | 27,886 | 33,201 | Batunadua | 2 ^{(c)} | 13 | 22731 |
| 12.77.01 | PS Utara (North PS) | 14.97 | 59,273 | 65,885 | 69,515 | Wek II | 16 ^{(d)} | - | 22711 -22719 |
| 12.77.04 | PS Hutaimbaru | 22.64 | 15,480 | 18,835 | 20,761 | Hutaimbaru | 5 ^{(e)} | 5 | 22700 -22709 |
| 12.77.06 | PS Angkola Julu | 22.90 | 7,508 | 9,351 | 10,425 | Joring Natobang | - | 8 | 22729 |
| | Totals | 159.28 | 191,531 | 225,105 | 243,843 | | 37 | 42 | |

Notes: (a) comprising Pijor Koling and Sihitang.
(b) comprising Aek Tampang, Hanopan, Losung, Padang Matinggi, Padang Matinggi Lestari, Sidangkal, Silandit, Sitamiang, Sitamiang Baru, Ujung Padang, Wek V and Wek VI.
(c) comprising Batunadua Jae and Batunadua Julu.
(d) comprising Batang Ayumi Jae, Batang Ayumi Julu, Bincar, Bonan Dolok, Kantin, Kayu Ombun, Losung Batu, Panyanggar, Sadabuan, Tanobato, Timbangan, Tobat, Wek I, Wek II, Wek III and Wek IV.
(e) comprising Hutaimbaru, Lembah Lubuk Manik, Lubuk Raya, Palopat Maria and Sabungan Jae.

== Economic ==
The majority of the people of Padangsidimpuan earn their income from farming, which includes rice fields and plantations. The main plantation product is zalacca. Initially, zalacca plantations were concentrated at the foot of Tor Sanggarudang (including Hutakoje, Hutalambung, and Sibakkua). However, in the late 1970s, zalacca plantations expanded to the foot of Mount Lubuk Raya (such as Lobu Layan, Sitaratoit, and Pintu Langit) and to the western area of the city. Other plantation products include rubber, coffee, coconut, cocoa, cloves, candlenuts, and cinnamon.

The following is a list of market facilities in Padangsidimpuan City:

1. Inpress Market (Aek Tampang dan Sadabuan)
2. Sangkumpal Bonang Market
3. Pasar Batu (Pajak Batu), the oldest market in the city
4. Cok Kodok Market
5. Mahera Market
6. Traditional Market (Poken), open every day of the week
7. Lubuk Raya Market in Joring Natobang
8. Pijor Koling Market
9. Hutaimbaru Market

== Transportation ==
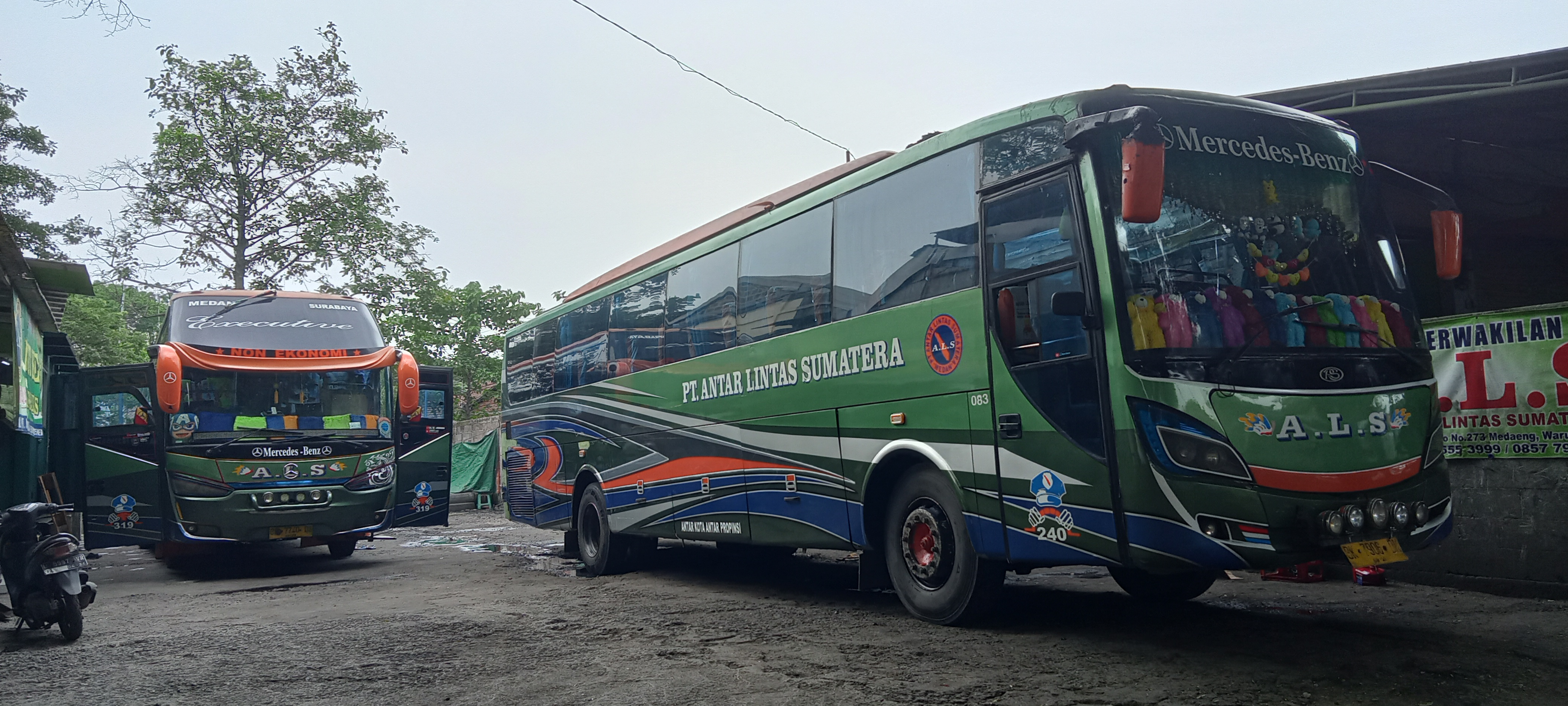
Antar Lintas Sumatera Bus

Padangsidimpuan City is located 448 km from Medan, the capital of North Sumatra Province, and is surrounded by South Tapanuli Regency. The city is accessible by both land and air transportation. There are two airports connected to Padangsidimpuan City: Ferdinand Lumbang Tobing Airport in Central Tapanuli Regency and Aek Godang Airport in North Padang Lawas Regency. For air transportation, the city is accessible via these airports.

For land transportation, Padangsidimpuan can be reached by road in approximately 10 hours. The city has good land access and is strategically located along the main route connecting various growth centers in the Sumatra region. The distance from Padangsidimpuan to Medan via Sibolga is 470 km, via Sipirok is 406 km, and via Gunung Tua is 507 km. Padangsidimpuan is also a key intersection for land routes to Medan, Sibolga, and Padang (West Sumatra) on the western Sumatra route.

Padangsidimpuan can be accessed from Medan, the capital of North Sumatra, and Padang, West Sumatra, by bus or taxi. Several bus companies, such as PO Bus Antar Lintas Sumatera, PO Bus Sampagul, PO Bus Satu Nusa, PO Bus Mandailing Antar Nusa, and other taxi services, operate on these routes.

=== Becak Sidimpuan ===
The most important public transportation in Padangsidimpuan is the Vespa tricycle. While motorized becaks in various Indonesian cities typically use mopeds or scooters, in Padangsidimpuan, it is the classic Vespa that powers the rickshaws.

The shape of the rickshaw is also interesting. The passenger seat at the front resembles the front of a bus, with clear glass forming a concave shape. Passengers board from the left side. The seat is not very large, so if the passenger is of a larger build, the rickshaw can only accommodate one person.

All of the tricycles, estimated to number more than 1,000 units, were produced in the 1970s. Generally, these Vespa tricycles were released in 1973, with the Vespa Sprint series also being available in 1970.

Although the Vespa is from an older era, this rickshaw is still well-maintained. Despite the availability of newer motorbikes with more advanced engines, this has not influenced pedicab owners to replace them. The classic Vespa remains a distinctive feature of the city of Padangsidimpuan.

== Demographics ==
=== Population ===
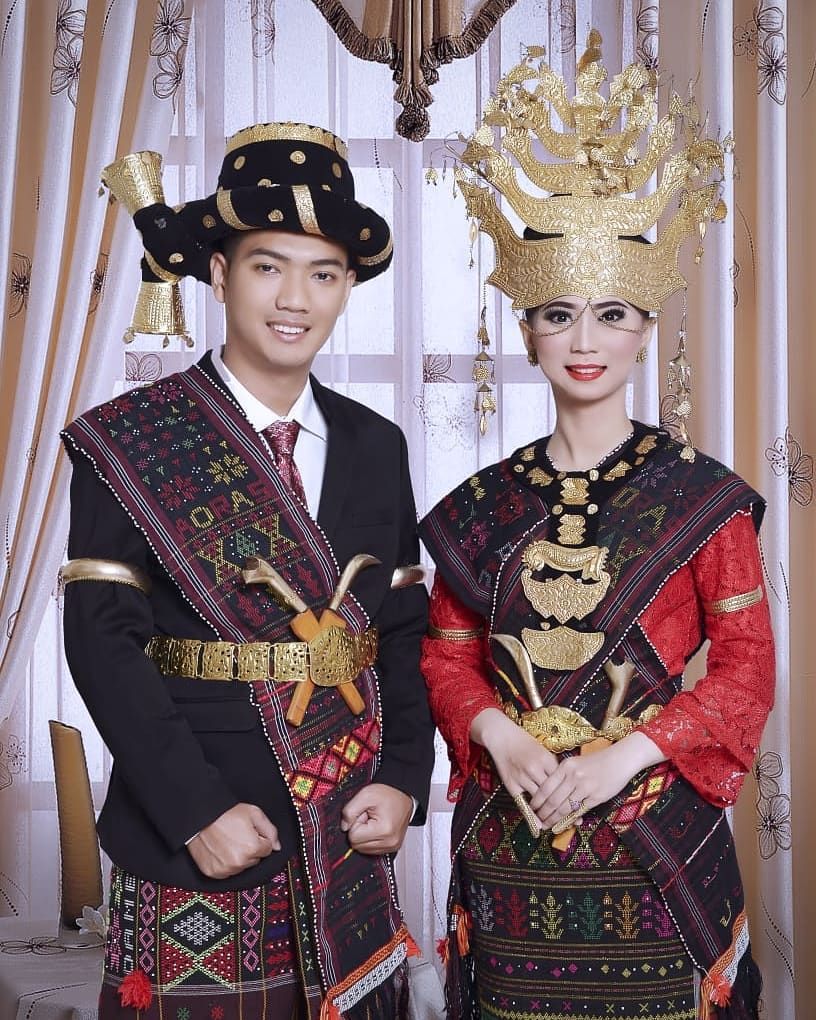
Batak Angkola traditional clothing which is the majority ethnic group in Padangsidimpuan.

The total population of Padangsidimpuan in 2022 was estimated at 231,062 people, consisting of 115,038 males and 116,024 females. With an area of 159.28 km^{2}, the population density is approximately 1,451 people per km^{2}.

=== Religion ===
The majority of residents in Padangsidimpuan are Muslims, with smaller communities of Protestants, Catholics, and Buddhists. According to the 2010 Census, the population breakdown is as follows: 89.95% Islam, 8.94% Protestantism, 0.46% Catholicism, 0.35% Buddhism, and 0.29% other religions.

Religion of Padangsidimpuan – 2010 Census
| Religion | Percent |
| Islam | 89.95% |
| Protestantism | 8.94% |
| Buddhism | 0.35% |
| Catholicism | 0.46% |
| Others | 0.29% |

== Climate ==
Padangsidimpuan has a tropical rainforest climate (Af) with moderate rainfall from June to August and heavy rainfall during the remaining months. The weather is mild throughout the year, with both rainy and sunny days.

Climate data for Padangsidempuan
| Month | Jan | Feb | Mar | Apr | May | Jun | Jul | Aug | Sep | Oct | Nov | Dec | Year |
|---|---|---|---|---|---|---|---|---|---|---|---|---|---|
| Mean daily maximum °C (°F) | 30.5 (86.9) | 30.7 (87.3) | 30.8 (87.4) | 30.6 (87.1) | 30.7 (87.3) | 30.4 (86.7) | 30.1 (86.2) | 29.9 (85.8) | 29.7 (85.5) | 29.4 (84.9) | 29.4 (84.9) | 29.8 (85.6) | 30.2 (86.3) |
| Daily mean °C (°F) | 25.1 (77.2) | 25.2 (77.4) | 25.5 (77.9) | 25.6 (78.1) | 25.6 (78.1) | 25.2 (77.4) | 24.8 (76.6) | 24.8 (76.6) | 24.8 (76.6) | 24.7 (76.5) | 24.7 (76.5) | 24.9 (76.8) | 25.1 (77.1) |
| Mean daily minimum °C (°F) | 19.7 (67.5) | 19.7 (67.5) | 20.2 (68.4) | 20.6 (69.1) | 20.5 (68.9) | 20.0 (68.0) | 19.6 (67.3) | 19.7 (67.5) | 19.9 (67.8) | 20.1 (68.2) | 20.1 (68.2) | 20.0 (68.0) | 20.0 (68.0) |
| Average rainfall mm (inches) | 243 (9.6) | 209 (8.2) | 239 (9.4) | 250 (9.8) | 159 (6.3) | 99 (3.9) | 90 (3.5) | 130 (5.1) | 176 (6.9) | 258 (10.2) | 266 (10.5) | 291 (11.5) | 2,410 (94.9) |
Source: Climate-Data.org

== Tourism ==
Tourism in Padangsidimpuan City has developed significantly, with several areas serving as popular tourist centers. These include the Salak Monument area, Jalan Merdeka, Pasar Pajak Batu, Tor (Bukit) Simarsayang, and Teletubbies Hill in Batunadua, all of which are key tourist destinations in the city.

=== Tugu Salak (Salak Monument) ===
The Tugu Salak is an iconic landmark of the city, and many Padangsidimpuan residents use it as a park or a place to relax, typically from the afternoon to the evening.

=== Alaman Bolak Padang Nadimpu (Padang Nadimpu Square) ===
Padang Nadimpu Square (Bahasa Indonesia : Alun-alun Padang nadimpu = Bahasa Angkola-mandailing : Alaman Bolak Padang Nadimpu) is located in the city center. It serves as a community gathering place open to the public, typically visited in the afternoon and evening to enjoy the atmosphere of the city center.

=== Pasar Pajak Batu Area. ===
The Pasar Pajak Batu area is one of the economic centers in Padangsidimpuan City, offering necessities, typical souvenirs from the city (Silua Sidimpuan), and other goods to meet the community's needs. At night, the area transforms into a culinary hub for the residents of Padangsidimpuan City.

=== Tor (Hill) Simarsayang ===
Tor Simarsayang is a hill in Padangsidimpuan City, located approximately 3 km from the city center. From the top of this hill, visitors can enjoy beautiful views of the city. At the summit of Simarsayang Hill, there are several cafes and relaxation spots. The area becomes lively in the afternoon and evening, offering a great vantage point to view Padangsidimpuan City at night.

== Gallery ==
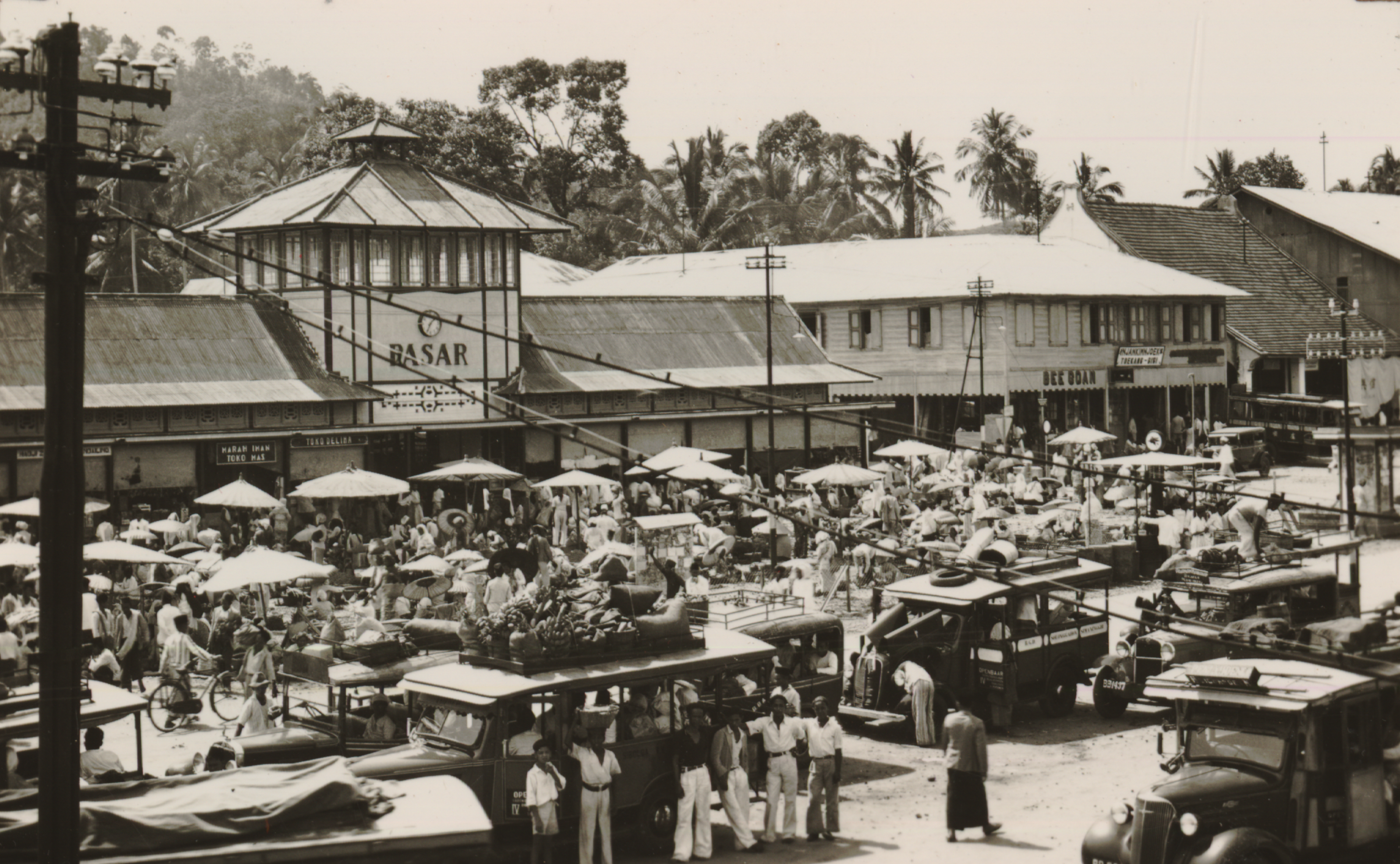
Market in Padangsidimpuan Between 1940 and 1950 (Now Sangkumpal Bonang Market)

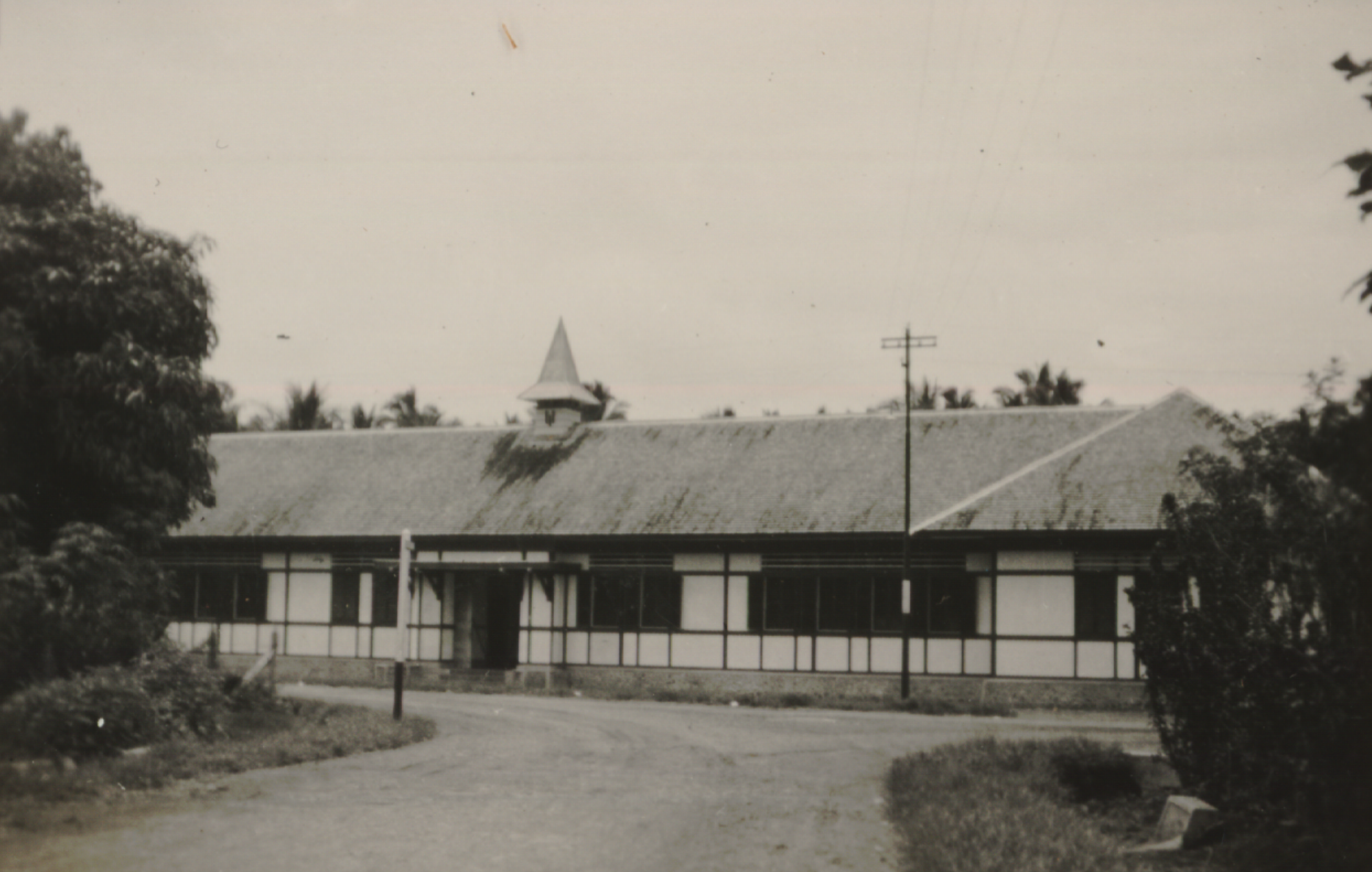
MULO School in Padangsidimpuan 1920–1930

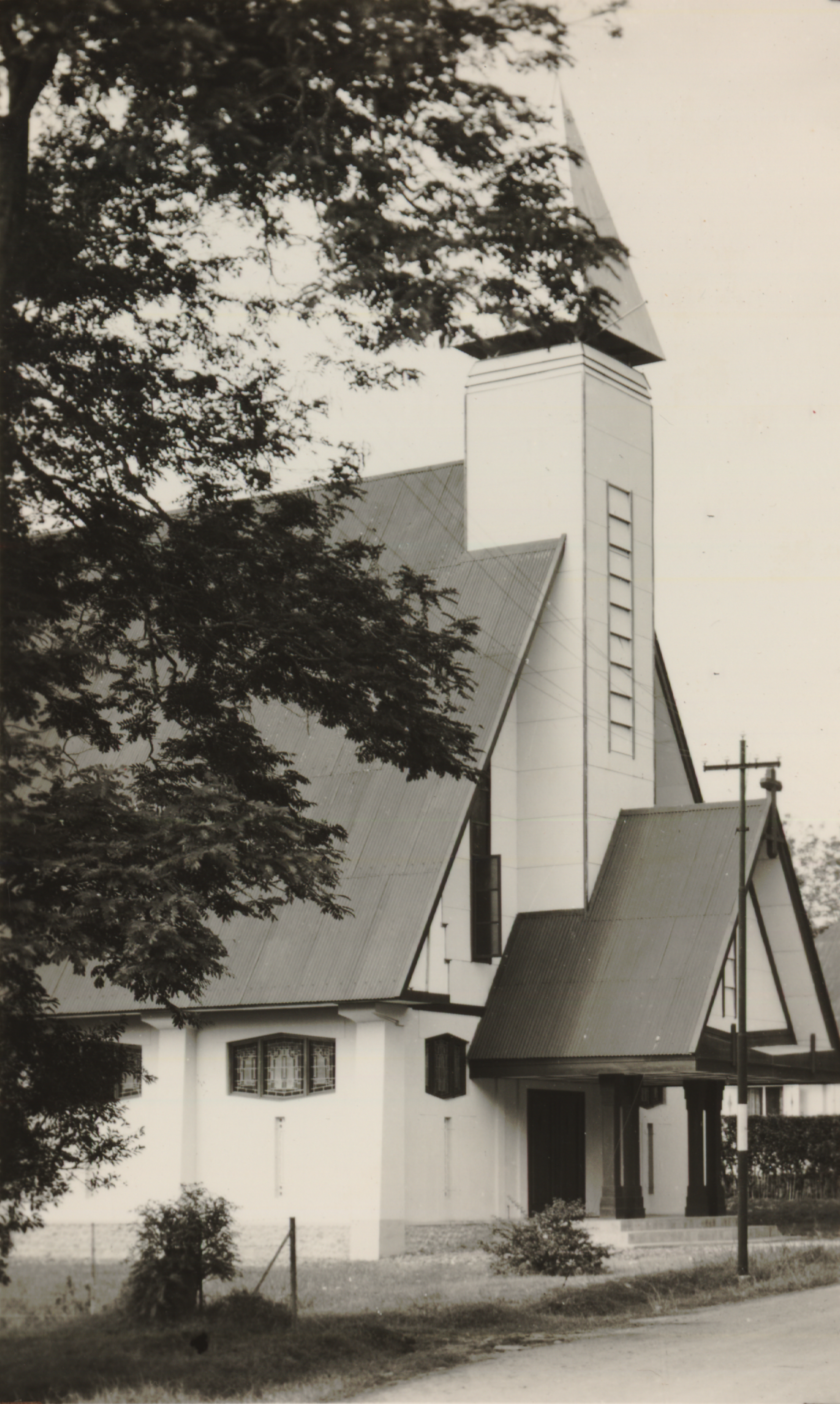
Protestant Church RMG Padangsidimpuan 1930-1940 (Now HKBP Padangsidimpuan)

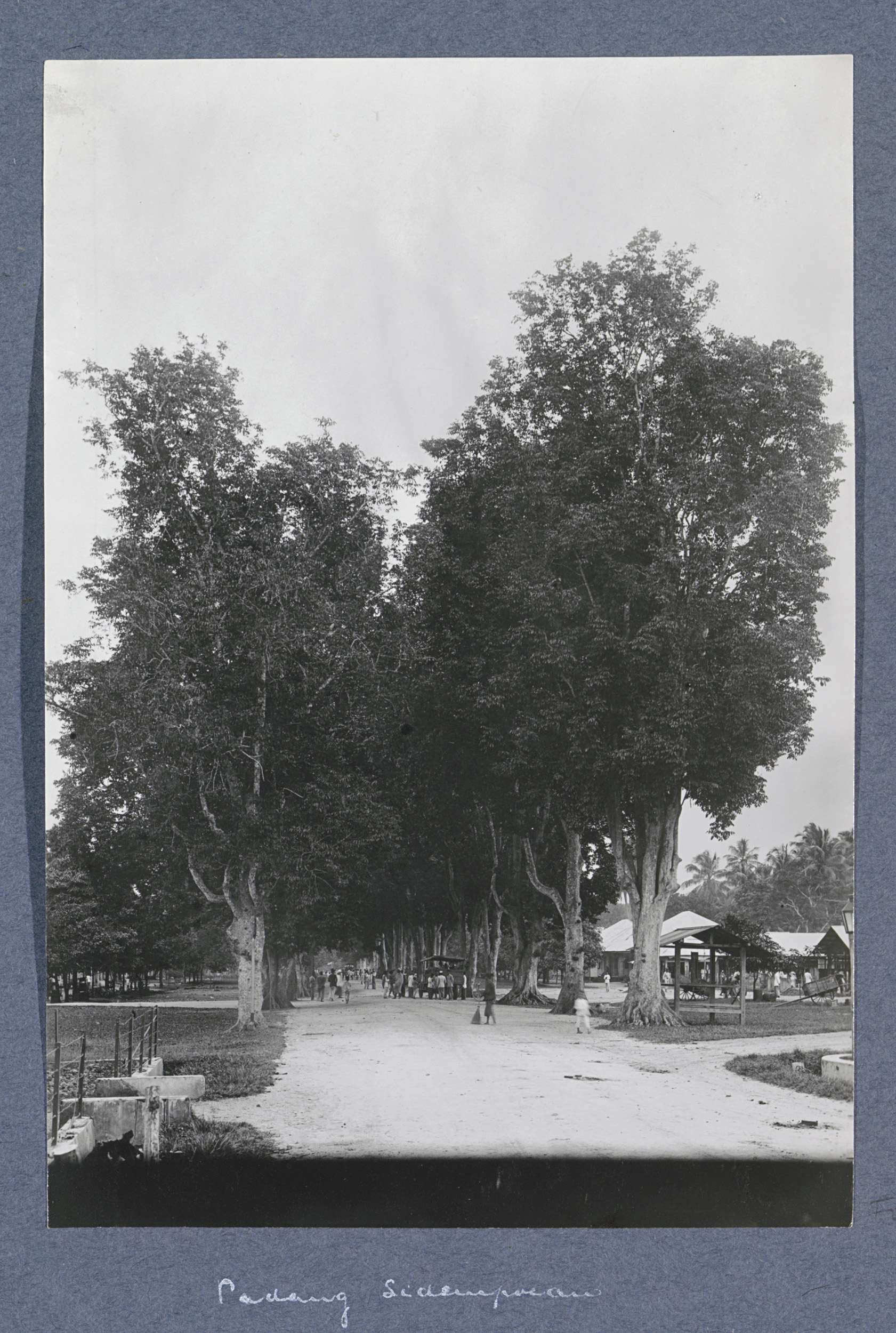
The Main Street in Padangsidimpuan City around 1900-1920s (now Jalan Merdeka)

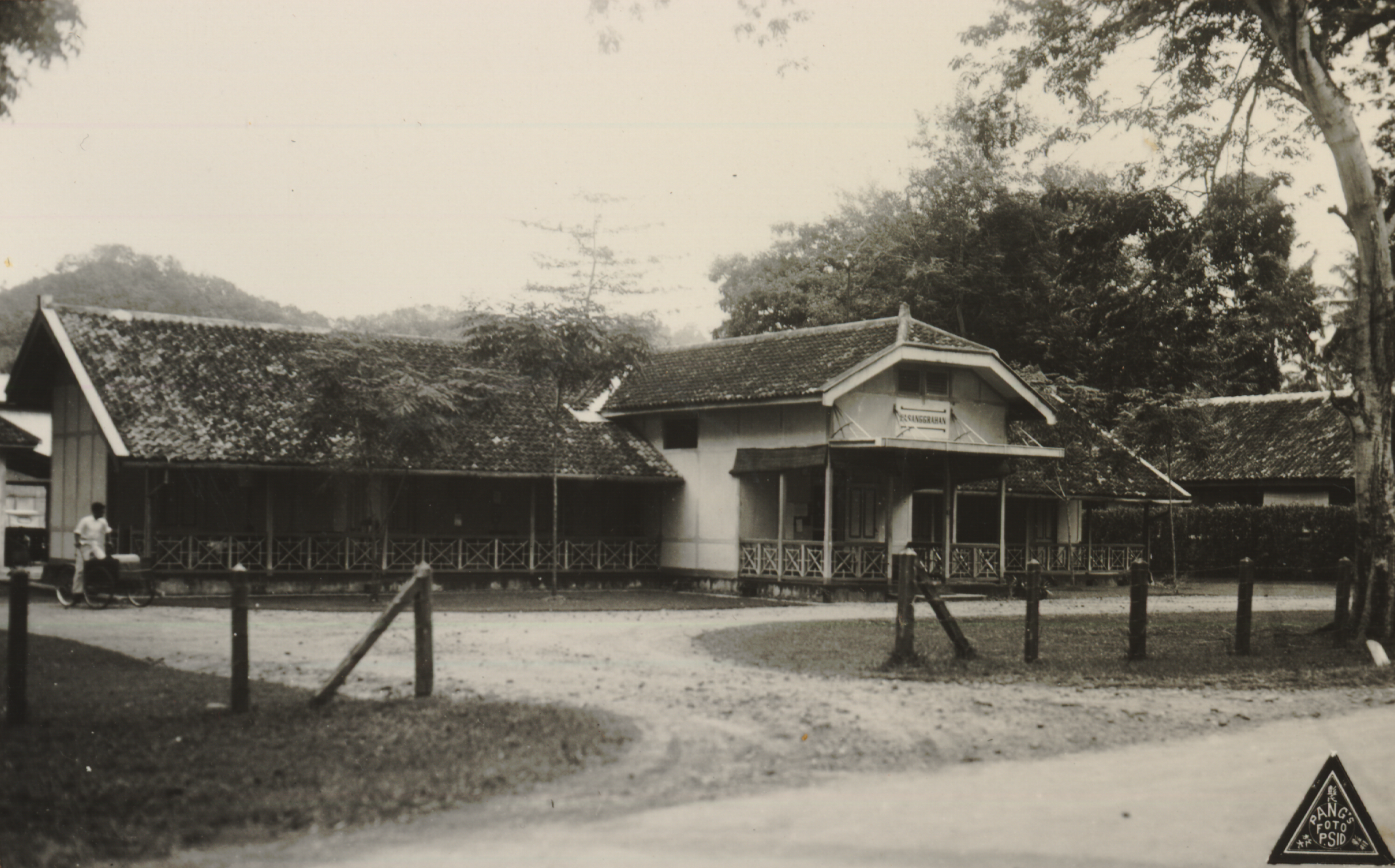
The Guesthouse (Pasanggrahan) in Padangsidempuan Between 1920 and 1930. (Now its the Major Office of Padangsidimpuan)

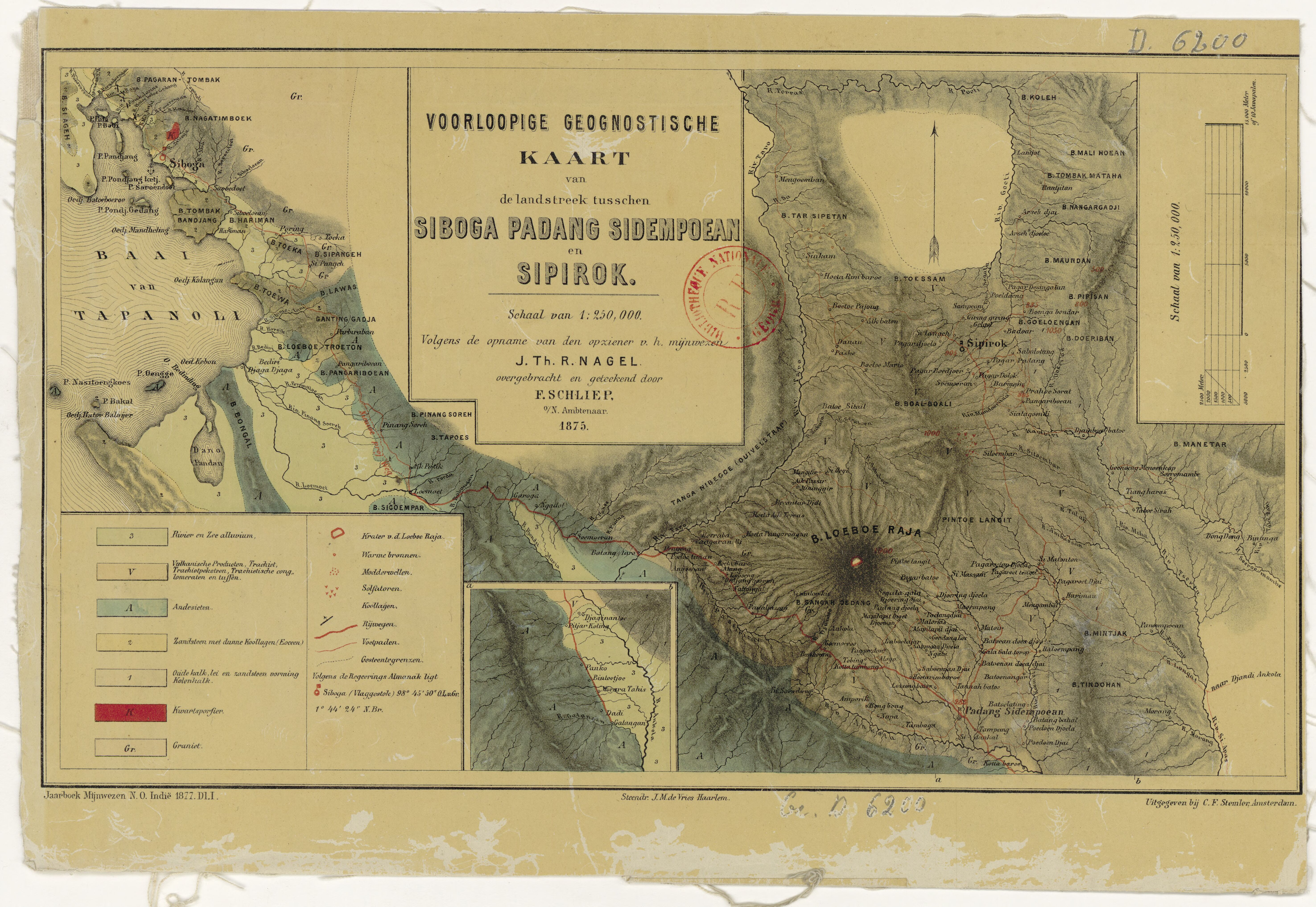
Map of the Padangsidempuan and Sibolga City Areas published by the Dutch East Indies Colonial Government in 1875 which shows the name of the city of Padang Sidempoean (in Bottom Right of the Image)

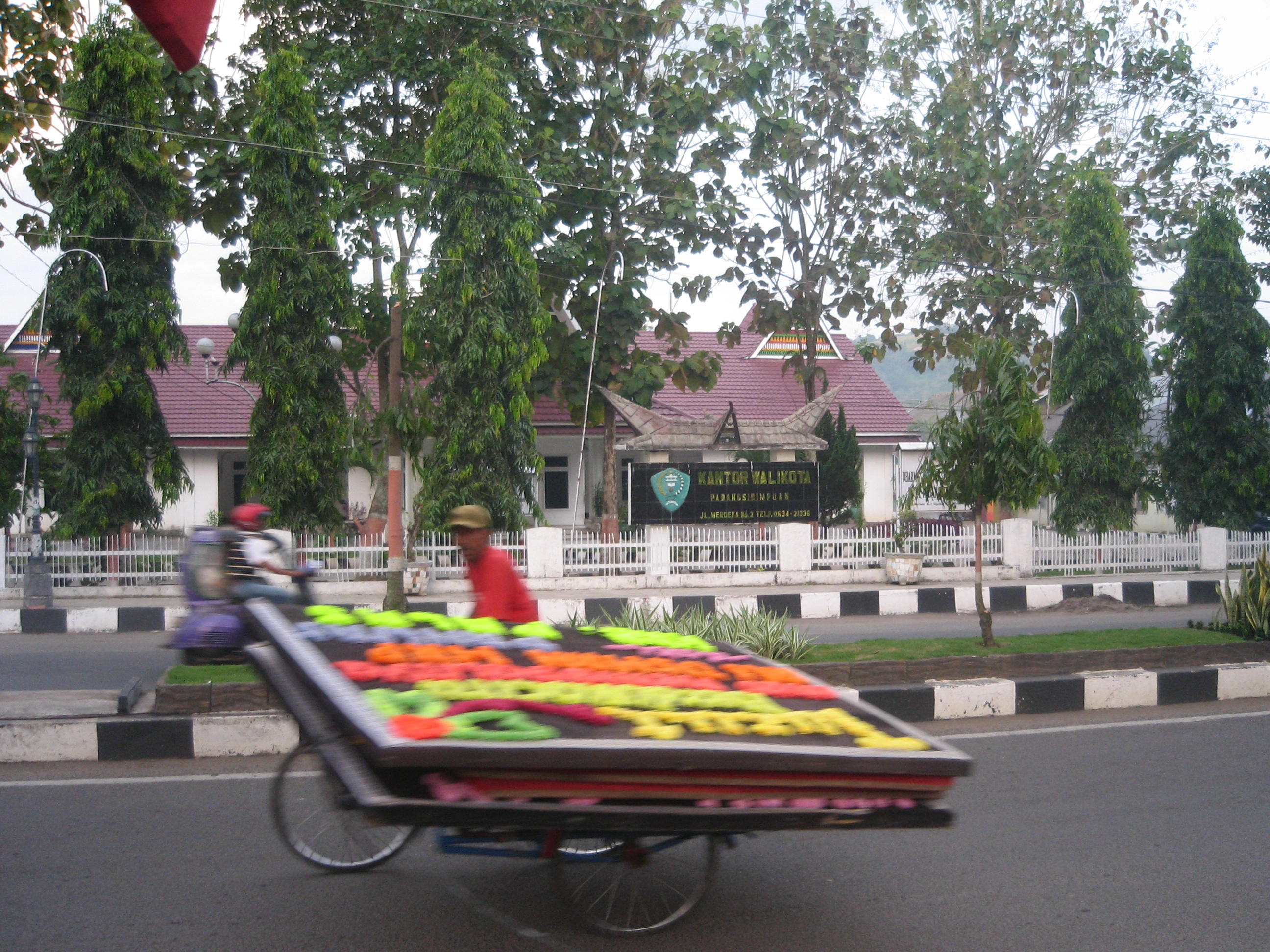
Merdeka Street in front of major office in padangsidimpuan
