= Basyral Hamidy Harahap =

Indonesian writer and humanist

- Born: 15 November 1940; Sihepeng, Siabu, Mandailing Natal, Indonesia
- Died: 9 January 2015 (aged 74); Jakarta, Indonesia
- Occupation: Writer
- Website: www.basyral-hamidy-harahap.com

Basyral Hamidy Harahap (15 November 1940 – 9 January 2015) was an Indonesian writer and humanist of Mandailing-Angkolan descent.

== Works ==
- Kiprah Pustakawan. PB Ikatan Pustakawan Indonesia. 1998. ISBN 9798038134.
- Derap Langakah Mandailing-Natal. Himpunan Keluarga Mandailing. 1997.
- Greget Tuanku Rao. Komunitas Bambu. 2007. ISBN 9793731168.
- Bibliografi Skripsi Universitas Indonesia. LIPI, Koninklijk Instituut voor Taal-, Land en Volkenkunde. 1979.
- Kejuangan Adam Malik 1917-1984. Yayasan Adam Malik. 1998.
- Si Bulus-bulus Si Rumbuk-rumbuk. Puisi Indonesia. 1987.
- Perjalanan-Kumpulan Puisi. Puisi Indonesia bekerjasama dengan Badan Pendorong Pembangunan Tapanuli Selatan. 1984.
- Siala Sampagul. Pemerintah Kota. 2004.
- Pemerintah Kota Padangsidimpuan Menghadapi Tantangan Zaman. Pemerintah Kota. 2003. ISBN 9799804906.
- Orientasi Nilai-nilai Budaya Batak. Sanggar Willem Iskander. 1987.
