= Sibualbuali =

Stratovolcano in northern Sumatra, Indonesia

Highest point
- Elevation: 1,819 m (5,968 ft)
- Coordinates: 1.556°N 99.255°E

Geography
- Location: Sumatra, Indonesia

Geology
- Rock age: 6,000,9028
- Mountain type: Stratovolcano
- Volcanic arc: Sunda Arc
- Last eruption: 12 February 2026

Climbing
- First ascent: 1829
- Easiest route: 6271

Sibualbuali is a stratovolcano in northern Sumatra, Indonesia. It has two solfatara fields on the eastern flank. There is a rhyolitic-dacitic lava dome, erupted from the Toru-Asik fault.

== See also ==
- List of volcanoes in Indonesia
