= Angkola language =

Austronesian language spoken in Sumatra, Indonesia

Angkola
- Native to: Indonesia
- Region: Sumatra (northern)
- Ethnicity: 610,000 Angkola people (2010 census)
- Native speakers: 500,000 (2010)
- Language family: Austronesian: Malayo-Polynesian; Northwest Sumatra–Barrier Islands; Batak; Southern; Angkola
- Writing system: Batak, Latin

Official status
- Regulated by: Badan Pengembangan dan Pembinaan Bahasa

Language codes
- ISO 639-3: akb
- Glottolog: bata1290

Angkola, or Batak Angkola, is an Austronesian language of Sumatra. It is spoken in South Tapanuli Regency and Padang Sidempuan.

== Phonology ==
Consonants
		Labial	Alveolar	Palatal	Velar	Glottal
Nasal		m	n	ɲ	ŋ	
Plosive/ Affricate	voiceless	p	t	tʃ	k	
Plosive/ Affricate	voiced	b	d	dʒ	ɡ	
Fricative			s			h
Rhotic			r			
Lateral			l			
Approximant		w		j		

Vowels
	Front	Central	Back
Close	i		u
Mid	e		o
Open		a	
