= Siabu =

- District
- Interactive map of Siabu
- Coordinates: 1°0′48.857″N 99°30′2.4736″E
- Country: Indonesia
- Province: North Sumatra
- Regency: Mandailing Natal

Area
  - Total: 345.36 km^{2} (133.34 sq mi)

Population (2023)
  - Total: 55,102
  - Density: 159.55/km^{2} (413.23/sq mi)
- Time zone: UTC+7 (Western Indonesia Time)
- Postal code: 22976

Siabu is an administrative district (kecamatan) in Mandailing Natal Regency, North Sumatra Province, Indonesia.
