= Ali Yusuf Siregar =

Politician

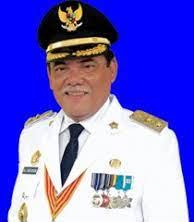

Regent of Deli Serdang
- In office 8 December 2023 – 23 April 2024; Acting from 6 November 2023
- Preceded by: Ashari Tambunan
- Succeeded by: Wirya Alrahman (act.)

Vice Regent of Deli Serdang
- In office 23 April 2019 – 6 November 2023

Personal details
- Born: 9 March 1961 (age 65) Mandailing Natal, North Sumatra, Indonesia
- Party: Nasdem

Ali Yusuf Siregar (born 9 March 1961) is an Indonesian politician of the NasDem Party and former civil servant. He served as the regent of Deli Serdang in North Sumatra briefly between 2023 and 2024, as a replacement of Ashari Tambunan. Siregar was previously Tambunan's vice regent between 2019 and 2023. Before entering politics, Siregar headed several districts within Deli Serdang between 1997 and 2010.

== Early life ==
Ali Yusuf Siregar was born on 9 March 1961 in the village of Lumban Dolok, in Mandailing Natal Regency, on 9 March 1961. He studied at elementary and middle school in Tanjung Morawa, before going to the provincial capital of Medan for high school. He received a bachelor's degree from Darma Agung University there.

== Career ==
In 1997, he became head (camat) of Tanjung Morawa district in Deli Serdang Regency, and subsequently served as head of the districts of Lubuk Pakam, Labuhan Deli, and Sunggal in the regency until 2010.

Siregar became the running mate of incumbent regent Ashari Tambunan in the 2018 regency election and won 82.5% of votes in the uncontested election. Tambunan resigned from his position as regent on 6 November 2023 in order to run in the 2024 Indonesian legislative election, and Siregar replaced him, initially as acting regent. Siregar was appointed as full regent on 6 December 2023. During his brief tenure, he conducted large-scale personnel changes in the regency's government, reassigning 89 officials on 22 April, the last full day of his tenure. His term ended on 23 April 2024 and he was replaced by Wirya Alrahman in an acting capacity.

He is a member of the NasDem Party, and is the party's chairman in Deli Serdang. He has declared that he will run in the regency's 2024 election for his first full term.

== Family ==
He is married to Sri Pepeni Handayani, and the couple have four children.
