= Hasjrul Harahap =

Indonesian politician and government official

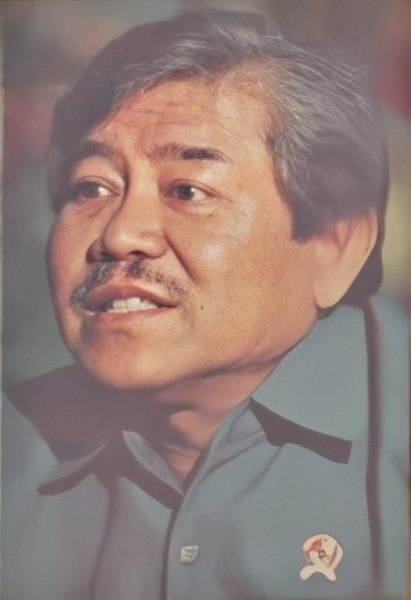

Minister of Forestry
- In office 1988–1993

Personal details
- Born: 18 November 1931
- Died: 8 February 2014 (aged 82)
- Education: Bogor Agricultural University

Hasjrul Harahap (18 November 1931 – 8 February 2014) was an Indonesian politician and government official. Harahap served as the Minister of Forestry from 1988 to 1993 under former President Suharto.

Harahap was born on 18 November 1931. He was raised in Sipirok, North Sumatra.

Harahap received a doctorate of science in 2004 from Bogor Agricultural University at the age of 73. He was the oldest student to receive a doctorate from the university. Harahap had defended his doctoral dissertation, "The Influence of Lead Pollution from Vehicles and Land on Tea Plants and Quality." He had researched the levels of lead pollution found in the roots of tea plants grown in the Puncak region of West Java: the Gunung Mas, Malabar, and Sidamanik tea plantations. Harashap founded that the highest levels of lead were found in the branches and soil of tea grown in the Gunung Mas plantation. The largest concentrations of lead in the roots of tea plants were discovered at Sidamanik. Harahap concluded in his dissertation that plantation workers were susceptible to symptoms of lead pollution.

His biography, Hasjrul Harahap, dari Mandor jadi Menteri (translated to Hasjrul Harahap, from a Supervisor to a Minister) was released in 2008. The 456-page book chronicling his life was co-authored by Aristides Katoppo and Nina Pane. The memoir was launched at a party held in Jakarta on 28 November 2008.

Hasjrul Harahap died on 8 February 2014, at the age of 82.
