= Ashari Tambunan =

Indonesian politician

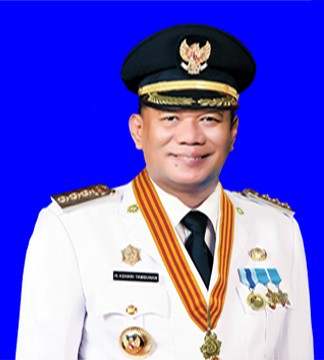
- Official portrait

Regent of Deli Serdang
- In office 23 April 2014 – 6 November 2023
- Preceded by: Amri Tambunan
- Succeeded by: Ali Yusuf Siregar

Personal details
- Born: 18 May 1956 (age 68); Medan, North Sumatra, Indonesia
- Political party: National Awakening Party

Ashari Tambunan (born 18 May 1956) is an Indonesian politician of the National Awakening Party. He was the regent of Deli Serdang Regency in North Sumatra between 2014 and 2023, and was elected a member of the House of Representatives in the 2024 Indonesian legislative election.

== Early life ==
Ashari Tambunan was born in Medan, North Sumatra on 18 May 1956, as the son of Indonesian Army major Djamaluddin Tambunan and first lieutenant Nurbanun Siregar. His father served as junior governor of North Sumatra in 1960 and governor of Jambi in 1974. Tambunan was educated in Medan, completing high school in 1974 and receiving a bachelor's degree in 1980. He was the seventh of eight children.

== Career ==
In 2013, Tambunan contested the regency election for Deli Serdang Regency, and he was with 160,694 votes (30%) in a ten-candidate race. He was sworn in on 14 April 2014 to replace his older brother Amri Tambunan as regent. He was reelected in the 2018 regency election in an uncontested election, as an opposing independent candidate was disqualified due to not fulfilling requirements. He established a healthcare emergency call center in the regency, inaugurated in 2023.

He resigned from his position as regent on 6 November 2023 in order to run as a National Awakening Party House of Representatives candidate in the 2024 Indonesian legislative election, and he was replaced by his vice regent Ali Yusuf Siregar. Tambunan won 134,230 votes, securing a seat.

== Family ==
Tambunan's family have had significant involvement in politics and government in North Sumatra. Aside from Djamaluddin and Amri, Ashari's son Adlin Umar Tambunan was elected as vice regent of Serdang Bedagai Regency, his sister-in-law Anita Lubis was elected into the North Sumatra Regional House of Representatives, and in 2023 Tambunan appointed his nephew Asri Ludin Tambunan as head of the regency's health department.
