= Golfrid Siregar =

Indonesian environmental activist (1985–2019)

Golfrid Siregar (1985 – 6 October 2019) was an Indonesian environmental activist, a member of the legal advocacy team of Wahana Lingkungan Hidup Indonesia (WALHI Sumut), also referred to as Friends of the Earth Indonesia, the country's biggest green NGO. Siregar offered legal assistance to local communities with respect to the land conflict between the local communities and the companies in their domain. He died on 6 October 2019, three days after being found unconscious on the side of a road with major head injuries. There were suspicions that his death was related to his human rights and environmental work. There were several request to the police, Indonesian National Commission on Human Rights, President of the Republic of Indonesia, Joko Widodo by his family, colleagues at WALHI, amnesty international, International Union for Conservation of Nature Netherland (IUCN NL) and Human Right Watch for an impartial and independent investigation into the circumstances of his death.

== Life ==
Golfrid Siregar was the Legal Manager at WALHI North Sumatra since 2016 till his death, he offers legal assistance to local communities to promote environmental protection and human rights. He offered legal assistance to local communities with respect to the land conflict between the local communities and the oil palm companies. He was also involved in legal cases between Siantar's villagers against a concrete company, fishermen of Pantau Labu against a sand company and villagers in Karo regency against illegal logging.

Before his death, he was engaged in a forgery lawsuit against the North Sumatra government in the permitting process for a US$1.6bn China-funded hydropower project being executed by PT North Sumatra Hydro Energy (NSHE). The hydropower project was threatening to a known natural habitat of a critically endangered species of Tapanuli orangutan. Onrizal, a forestry researcher at the University of North Sumatra claimed his signature was forged on the revised environmental impact assessment the hydro energy company NSHE used to obtain a license and that his analysis about the impact of the project on local orangutan and tiger populations was omitted. He signed off on 2014 assessment of the dam's environmental impact, but later, kick against the project. He discovered that his signature was added to the 2016 version of the report without his permission. The hydropower company claims the 2016 report was a mere addendum to the 2014 report earlier signed by Mr. Onrizal. Sumatra Police issued a Termination Letter of Investigation (SP3) to close the investigation about the alleged forgery earlier filed by Siregar and this triggered him to report them to the National Police for misconduct. Siregar also lodged a complaint of potential fund misappropriation and corruption with Corruption Eradication Commission (KPK) against the project developer PT NSHE and local government.

== Controversies surrounding his death ==
In the evening of 2 October 2019, Mr. Siregar was said to have visited his uncle's house, played board games, drank tea and left at about 11 p.m. At about 1:15 a.m., Siregar's unconscious body was brought to the hospital by three men claiming he was found lying in the street. On Oct. 11, North Sumatra Chief-of-Police Agus Andriyanto announced in a media statement that Siregar's death was as a result of a single-vehicle traffic accident which occurred when his motorbike hit a kerb, and that alcohol was in his system according to the conducted autopsy report. His death was claimed by his family and fellow activists to be related to his human rights and environmental work. The three men who found him were later arrested for theft of his personal belongings but not assault.

The suspicions was further heightened by the previous records of human right abuses against activists, most especially environmental defenders in Indonesia. Siregar had supposedly received multiple death threats, connected to his active opposition to a hydropower plant project. The police report was refuted by his family and fellow activists. It was suspected that the head injury he sustained was a result of having been beaten rather than a motorbike accident or in an attack by bike-riding robbers, as reported in the preliminary police reports because he had no body injury. This was further backed by the medical opinion of Dr Poaradda Nababan, a surgeon and a member of North Sumatra Province Legislative Assembly, who argued that Siregar's injuries did not correlate with the traffic accident.

Family and friends also suspected that right-eye bruises on his body seemed to be from a hard, direct blow. The possibility of violent theft was also contested by his fellow activists that his motorbike should have been stolen along with his missing personal belongings. The said road on which he was found was reported by his colleagues in WALHI to have no traffic route that could relate with the police's accident story. They also suspected the autopsy conducted by the doctor chosen by the police and that the autopsy was carried out after having been bathed and embalmed. The clothes found on Siregar's unconscious body contained mud and wet soil, despite the fact that the place where he was found was paved, without soil nearby; This further strengthens the argument by family and fellow activists that someone was trying to cover up by dropping his body by the road side after being assaulted elsewhere.

In September, Siregar received an invitation to provide further clarification to his report of misconduct of the Sumatra Police from the Professional and Security Division (Propam) Mabes POLRI. Andi Muhammad Rezaldy, a legal and human rights advocate working with the Commission for Missing Persons and Victims of Violence (Kontras) said the police refused their request to have access to the official documents relating to the death of Siregar. There are also questions regarding the police non-disclosure of the details of the traffic accident analysis that leads to their conclusion about how Siregar die.

== Remembrance of Siregar’s death ==
On October 17, WALHI joined the Kamisan event, a weekly silent protest organized since 2007 against human right abuses and to honor deaths of human right activists and university students during the new order era, to commemorate the death of Siregar. Environmentalists around the world mourned Siregar's death and acknowledged his contributions to environmental and human right movement.
