= Ishak Charlie =

Indonesian entrepreneur

- Born: September 12, 1953 (age 72); Medan
- Other names: Li Tjin Hak (李振合)
- Occupation: Owner PT. Arga Citra Kharisma
- Spouse: Ermy Tandy
- Children: Handoko Lie; Lydia Agustina Lie; Joko Lie

Ishak Charlie (Chinese: 李振合, born September 12, 1953) is an Indonesian entrepreneur. Has experience managing various types of companies, ranging from plastic industry, pulp & paper industry, palm oil, palm oil plantation and construction spread all over Indonesia for more than 35 years. GlobeAsia Magazine lists Ishak Charlie as one of the 150 richest people in Indonesia with PT. Arga Citra Kharisma.

== Career ==
Ishak Charlie's business career started from the business by establishing PT Anugrah Tambak Perkasindo engaged in shrimp aquaculture in 1988. That pond business was successful until the pond area to be as big as 435 Ha. And in 2002 the company became an open company and listed on the Jakarta Stock Exchange under the name of PT Anugrah Tambak Perkasindo Tbk. Shrimp aquaculture business is located in the village of Pematang Lalang, Percut Sei Tuan, Deli Serdang Regency, North Sumatera, Indonesia. Only 20 km away from the capital city of North Sumatra, Medan. After that, he extends to other businesses. Started from plastic industry, pulp & paper industry, palm oil, palm plantation and construction spread all over Indonesia
In 2003, he collaborated with PT. Ciputra International builds Citra Garden Medan's project estate, with a unique blend of classic elegance and a modern flair into an icon for the city of Medan.
In 2006, Ishak Charlie also founded PT. Kurnia Tetap Mulia, engaged in property and build new icon of Medan B & G Tower and JW Marriott Hotel Medan with 28 floor high
With PT. Arga Citra Kharisma, in 2012 he also rebuild the Landmark pride of Medan City in the form of superblock Center Point Medan in Medan City Center consisting of Business Center, Mall, Apartment, and Hotel which can accommodate more than 5000 jobs.

== Achievements ==
- 150 richest people in Indonesia in 2016 from GlobeAsia magazine
- The top 3 largest taxpayers in 2015
