= Sofyan Tan =

dr. Sofyan Tan
- 陳金揚
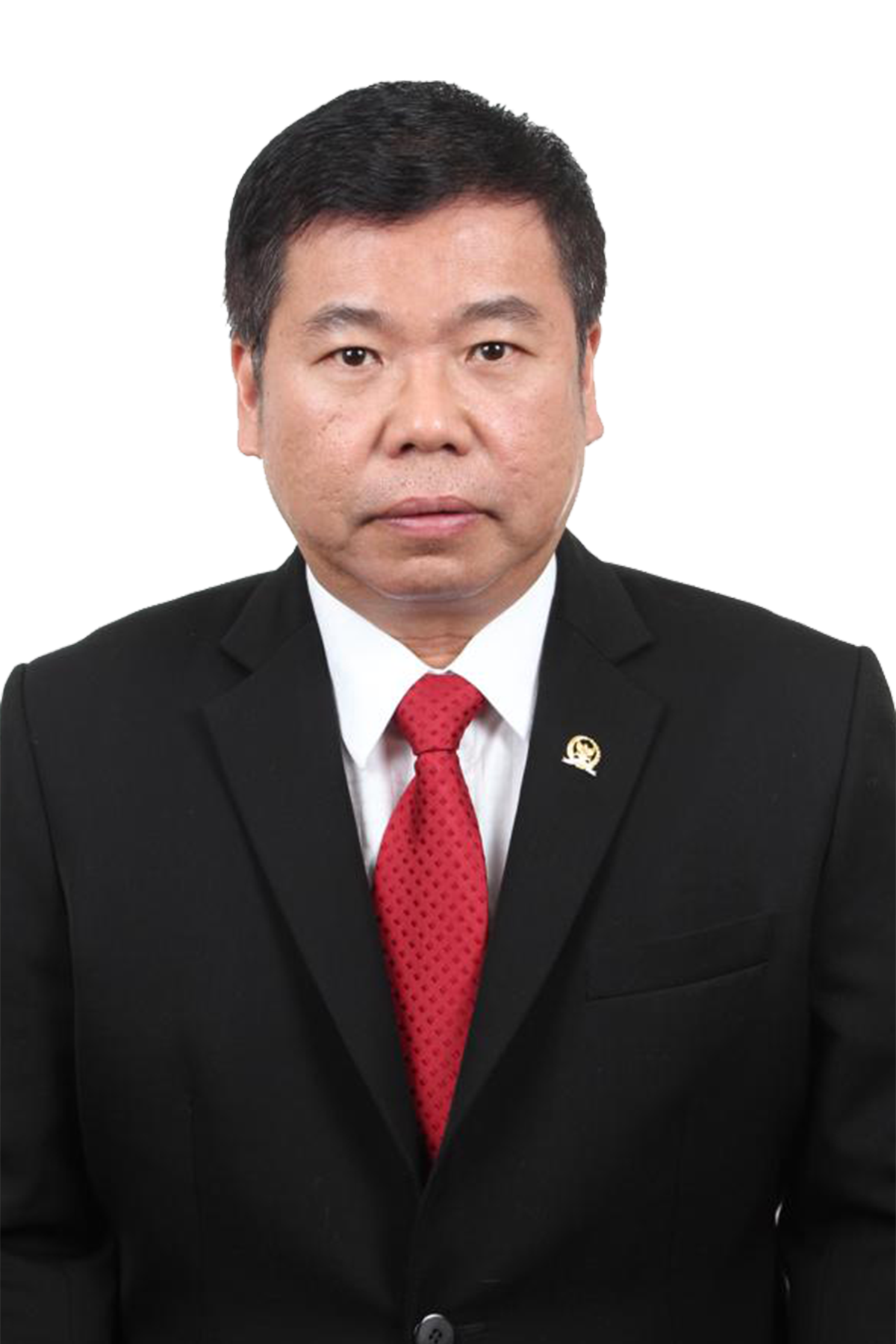

Member of the People's Representative Council for North Sumatra I
- Constituency: North Sumatra I

Personal details
- Born: Tan Kim Yang; 25 September 1959 (age 67) Medan, Indonesia
- Education: Universitas Methodist Indonesia
- Occupation: doctor and politician

Sofyan Tan, born Tan Kim Yang (Chinese: 陈金揚; Pe̍h-ōe-jī: Tân Kim Iông; born 25 September 1959) is an Indonesian doctor and politician from Medan. He was elected as member of the House of Representatives in 2019 from the North Sumatran first electoral district. He was reelected for a second term in 2024.

He was born and raised in Medan, attending Sutomo School and later studying medicine at the Universitas Methodist Indonesia.

== Work ==
Long being an educational advocate, he founded a private school Yayasan Perguruan Sultan Iskandar Muda aiming to help underprivileged students in 1987. In 1992 he was awarded the Ashoka Fellowship for his educational work.

== Family ==
He is married to Elinar and has 4 children.
