= Dinda Permata =

Indonesian singer

- Birth name: Adinda Permata Suci Nababan
- Born: April 27, 1992 (age 32); Medan, Indonesia
- Genres: Pop; R&B; Dangdut
- Occupations: Singer; musician
- Instruments: vocals
- Years active: 2015–present
- Labels: Nagaswara

Adinda Permata Suci Nababan (born April 27, 1992), known professionally as Dinda Permata, is an Indonesian singer and musician. She rose to fame in Malaysia as one of the contestants of the season two of Big Stage, a Malaysian reality television show produced by Astro.

== Big Stage Season 2 ==
Dinda Permata represents her native country of Indonesia in Malaysian reality show, Big Stage Season 2 which airs on Astro Ria. She was announced as a second contestant to be eliminated on the third week. However, Bruneian representative Aziz Harun withdraw from the show to pursue his studies abroad and she was safe to compete the following week.

Performance:
Week	Theme	Song	Original Artist	Result
Week 1	N/A	"Tak Sanggup Lagi"	Herself	SAFE
Week 2	Hype Beat	"Temberang"	Ayda Jebat	SAFE
Week 3	Glocal Hits	"Terlalu Memuja"	Wany Hasrita	SAFE
Week 4	Duominasi	"Kamu Yang Ku Tunggu" (with Ayie Floor 88)	Afgan Syahreza & Rossa	SAFE
Week 5	Cannot Brain	"Dhoom Machale"	Sunidhi Chauhan	SAFE
Week 6	Siti Nurhaliza's selected songs	"Anta Permana"	Siti Nurhaliza	SAFE
Week 6	Battle Round	"Lagu Untukmu" (with Santesh)	Meet Uncle Hussain	SAFE
Week 7	Road To Final	"Secangkir Madu Merah"	Amelina & Sheeda	SAFE
Week 7	Duets	"I Will Always Love You" (with Idayu)	Whitney Houston	SAFE
Week 8	Finale	"Ku Tak Bisa"	Herself	SAFE

== Discography ==
=== Singles ===
- "Ga Segitunya Keleus" (2016)
- "Ku Tak Bisa" (2018)
- "Seseorang Dihatimu" (2018)
- "Ku Tak Bisa" (2019)
- "Syarat Bahagia" (2019)
- "Cewek Matic" (2019)

== Filmography ==
Year	Title	Role	Notes
2019	Big Stage (Season 2)	Herself	Malaysian reality TV show
