= Sofjan Saury Siregar =

Indonesian religious scholar (1951-2017)

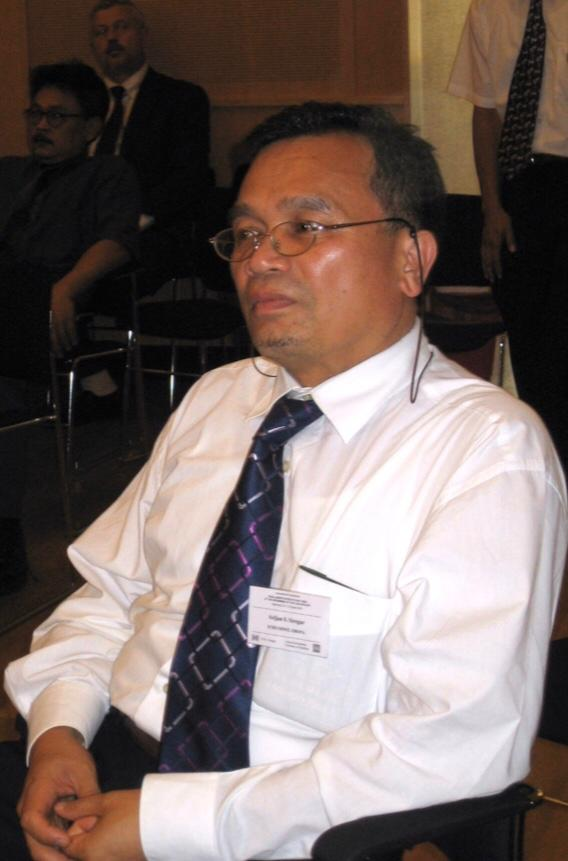
- Siregar in 2005
- Born: January 5, 1951; Tapanuli Selatan, Indonesia
- Died: October 23, 2017 (aged 66); Novi Pazar, Serbia
- Education: Universitas Islam Negeri (formerly IAIN) Sunan Kalidjaga, Yogyakarta, Indonesia Islamic University of Madinah, Saudi Arabia Imam Muhammad bin Saud Islamic University Riyadh, Saudi Arabia
- Spouse: Berlian Tri Astuti (m. 1980)
- Children: 3
- Parents: Syahmin Azhari Siregar (father); Bagarah Harahap (mother)

Sofjan Saury Siregar (5 January 1951 – 23 October 2017) was an Indonesian religious scholar, active community leader, and presidential contender. He authored De Edele Koran, a contemporary Dutch translation of the Quran, that is widely used in the Netherlands and Belgium.

He joined the race for Indonesian presidency in 2004 and 2014. He founded a new political party named Partai Maslahat Rakyat in 2002. He was also the chairman of the European chapter of the Indonesian Association of Muslim Intellectuals (ICMI) between 2000 and 2015.

When Indonesia experienced a political and societal turmoil in 2000, the tension also impacted the Indonesian community in the Netherlands. He spearheaded the formation of the Indonesian Community in the Netherlands' Communication Forum (Forum Komunikasi Masyarakat Indonesia di Netherland – FKMIN.) This forum is meant to provide an inter-faith communication platform for the Indonesian community in the Netherlands. For his services in promoting inter-faith dialogue and for his humanitarian work, he was named Ambassador for Peace by the Universal Peace Federation (UPF), formerly known as Interreligious and International Federation for World Peace) in 2003.

Until his departure in 2017, he was the chairman of the Indonesische Stichting Rotterdam (ISR).

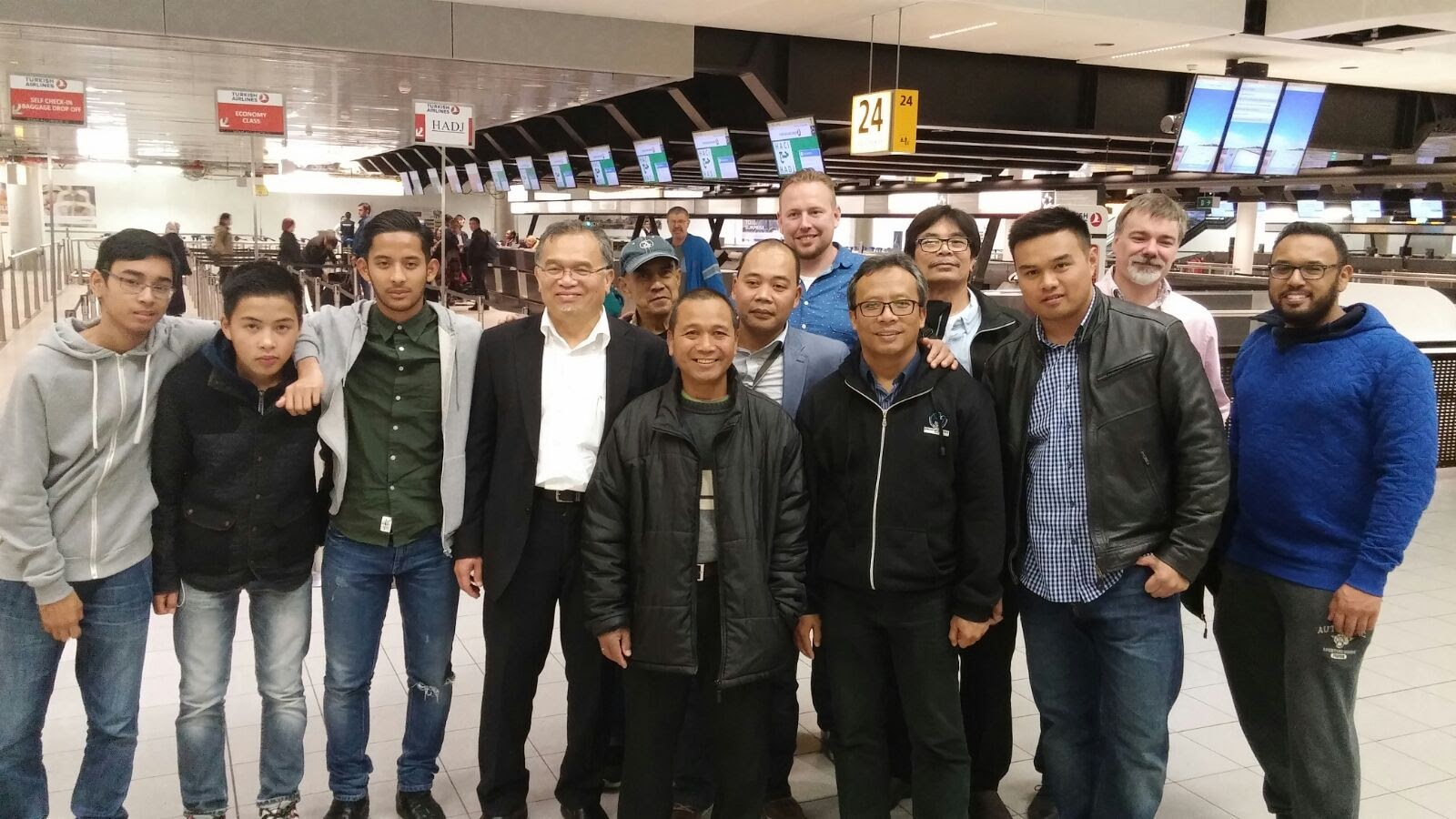
Members of ISR at Schiphol Airport 2015

== Family ==
In 1980, he married Berliantri Astuti in Medan, Indonesia. Within two months of the marriage, the couple moved to the Netherlands. They have three children: Sjahdian Siregar (son), Sabrina Siregar (daughter), Syarifah Siregar (daughter).
