= Sori Siregar =

Indonesian writer

- Born: Sutan Sirovi Sori Siregar; 12 November 1939; Medan, Sumatra's East Coast Residency, Dutch East Indies
- Died: 21 June 2021 (aged 81); South Tangerang, Banten, Indonesia
- Occupations: Writer, translator, editor
- Writing career
- Pen name: Sori Siregar
- Language: Indonesian

Sutan Sirovi Sori Siregar (12 November 1939 – 21 June 2021), better known as Sori Siregar, was an Indonesian writer. After graduating his high school in Medan (1959), he continued his higher education in Medan and started writing in 1960. He wrote short stories for 18 years, followed by his first novel in 1980. He is a younger brother of Ridwan Siregar.

== Life and work ==
Being active in literary world, he attended the Indonesian writers conference (Konferensi Karyawan Pengarang Seluruh Indonesia (KKPI) in Jakarta (1964), the Asian PEN Club conference in Taipei, Taiwan, the 37th International PEN Club conference in Seoul, South Korea, and in 1970–1971 the International Writing Program, the University of Iowa, Iowa City, USA. He worked for RRI Nusantara III Medan (English Section, 1966–1972), BBC Radio London (Indonesia Section, 1972–1974), Radio Talivishen Malaysia, Kuala Lumpur (Indonesian section, 1975–1978) Kuala Lumpur, Radio Republik Indonesia (RRI) National Station Jakarta (1979–1982) and the Voice of America (Indonesian section, 1982–1985), Washington DC, USA. During his stay in Jakarta, he worked as an editor of several magazines as Times, Executive, Matra, Sarinah, Justice Forum and so on. He wrote short stories in various medias as Horizon , Kompas, Sarinah, The Jakarta Post, Media Indonesia, Bisnis Indonesia, Java Pos, Republika and so on.

He wrote short stories, two of which won the Jakarta Arts Council Award: Woman that is Mother and Telopon. Both were published by Balai Pustaka. And also novel Initial climbing and two collection of short stories Meeting Point Jail are also published by Balai Pustaka. Another collection of short stories Among a Thousand Colors published by Pustaka Jaya and a collection of short stories Senja published by Nusa Indah, Flores. A latest collection of short stories "A While in This Life" was published in 2003 by Penerbit Progres(Progress Publishers), Jakarta. Furthermore, a short story collection "Kisah Abrukuwah" published by Kompas Gramedia Group. He also translated many works of foreign literature including novels, short stories and dramas, into Indonesian. Some of the short stories are from authors such as Jorge Luis Borges, Erskine Caldwell, John Steinbeck, etc.

== Publications ==
- Siregar, Sori (1967). Dosa Atas Manusia (short stories) (in Indonesian). Jakarta: Medan : Sastra Leo. OCLC 220393119.
- Siregar, Sori (1972). Pemburu dan Harimau (stories for children) (in Indonesian). Jakarta: Pustaka Jaya. OCLC 220600553.
- Siregar, Sori (2004). Senja (short stories) (in Indonesian). Jakarta: Nusa Agung, Nusa Indah. LCCN 76941421. OCLC 57235927.
- Siregar, Sori (1979). Wanita itu adalah Ibu (novel) (in Indonesian). Jakarta: Jakarta : Balai Pustaka. OCLC 10108145.
- Siregar, Sori (1985). Awal pendakian (novel) (in Indonesian). Jakarta: Jakarta : Balai Pustaka. OCLC 13899550.
- Siregar, Sori (1992). Penjara (short stories) (in Indonesian). Jakarta: Jakarta : Balai Pustaka. ISBN 9794074152. OCLC 27954339.
- Titik Temu (short stories, 1996)
- Siregar, Sori (1996). Titik Temu (short stories) (in Indonesian). Jakarta: Jakarta : Balai Pustaka. ISBN 9794079839. OCLC 68580211.
