= Mulfachri Harahap =

Indonesian politician and lawyer

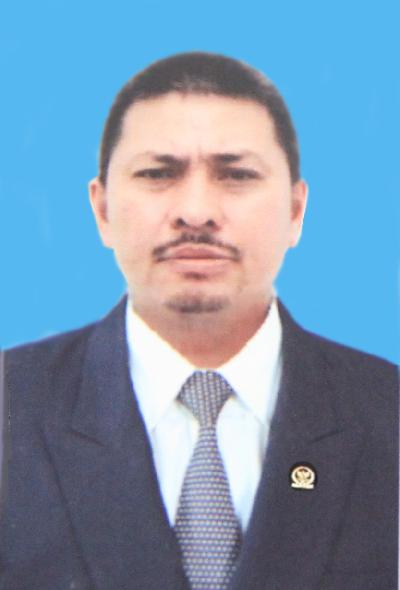

Member House of Representatives of the Republic of Indonesia
- In office 2014–2019

Personal details
- Born: March 23, 1966 (age 60) Jakarta

Mulfachri Harahap (born March 23, 1966, Jakarta) is an Indonesian politician and lawyer. He was elected to the House of Representatives in 2014 representing the Electoral District of North Sumatra I with 47,280 votes. He served in commission 3 in charge of the Law. He is also chairman of the National Mandate Party faction in the House of Representatives of the Republic of Indonesia.
