= Angkola people =

One of Batak ethnic groups

Batak Angkola ᯅᯖᯄ᯦᯲ ᯀᯰᯄ᯦ᯬᯞ
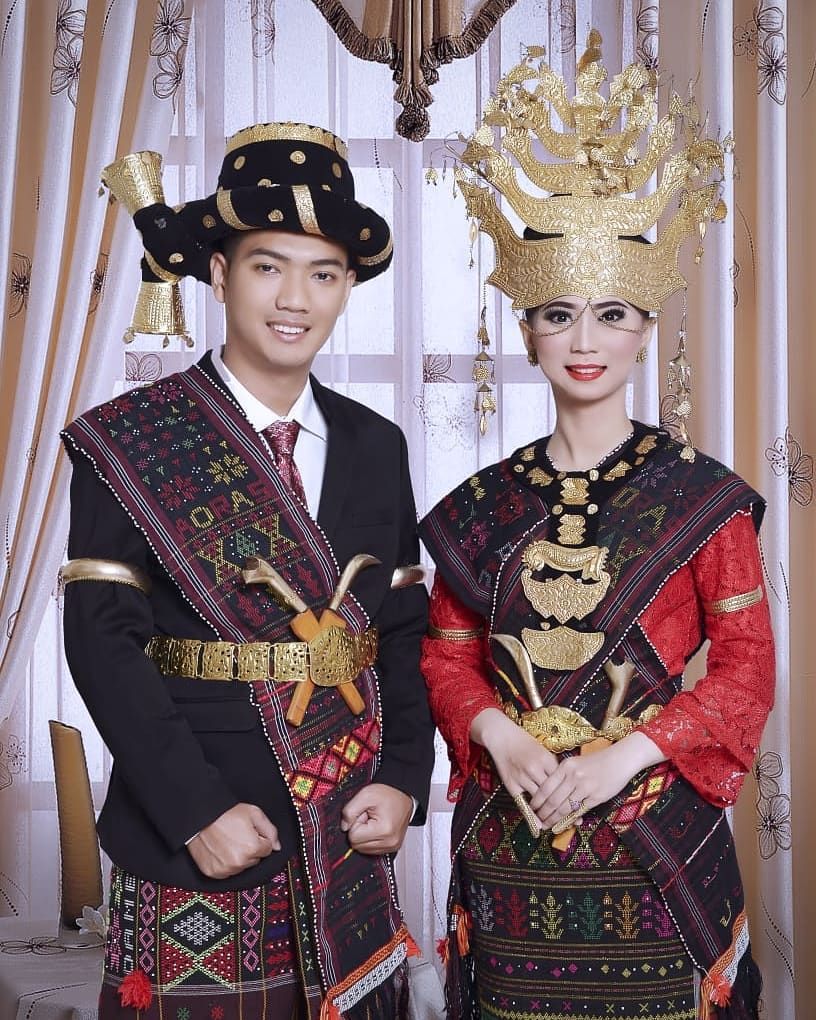

Total population
- 1,238,000

Regions with significant populations
- Indonesia (North Sumatra)

Languages
- Angkola language, Toba language

Religion
- Sunni Islam (majority) and Christianity (minority)

Related ethnic groups
- Toba Batak, Mandailing, Simalungun

The Angkola (also known as Angkola Batak) people are one of the sub-ethnic groups of the Batak people, found mainly in North Sumatra, Indonesia. They primarily inhabit the southern part of Tapanuli region. The Angkola language is similar to Mandailing language also with Toba language, but it is sociolinguistically distinct.

The name Angkola is believed to have originated from the Angkola River (Batang Angkola), which was named by an officer called Rajendra Kola (Angkola or city lord) who was passing through Padang Lawas and later came to power there. The southern (downstream) part of the Angkola River is called Angkola Jae, while the northern (upstream) part is called Angkola Julu.

The Angkola people practice patrilineal kinship, and the clans and surnames of the Angkola people are based on the patrilineal system. There are only a few Angkola surnames – Siregar, Dalimunthe, Harahap, Hasibuan, Rambe, Nasution, Daulay, Tanjung, Ritonga, Batubara, and Hutasuhut, amongst others. Angkola society strictly prohibits marriage between people with the same surname.

Most of the Angkola are Muslims, while a small minority are Christians.

== Gallery ==
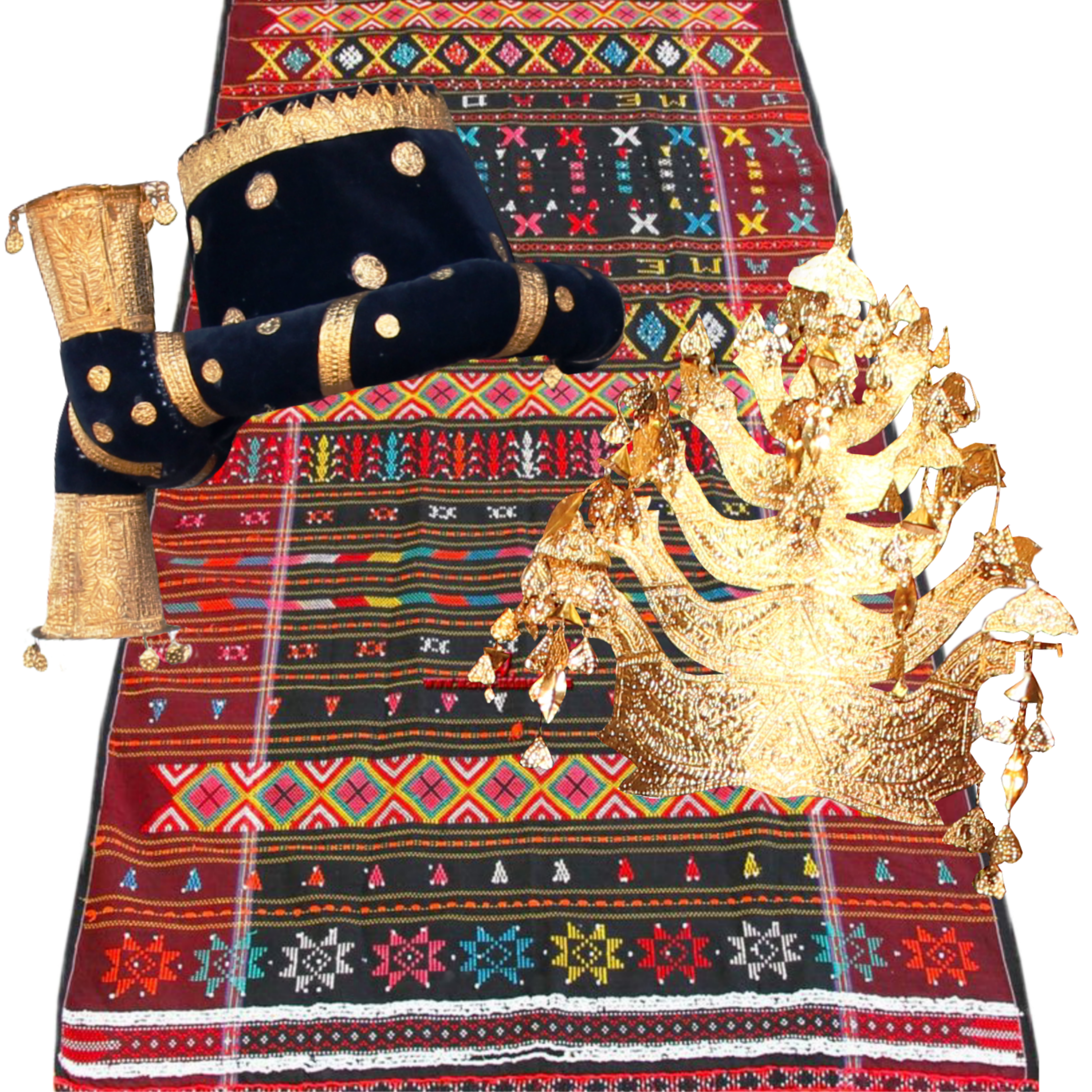
The traditional clothing of the Batak Angkola consists of ulos godang, ampu, and bulang.

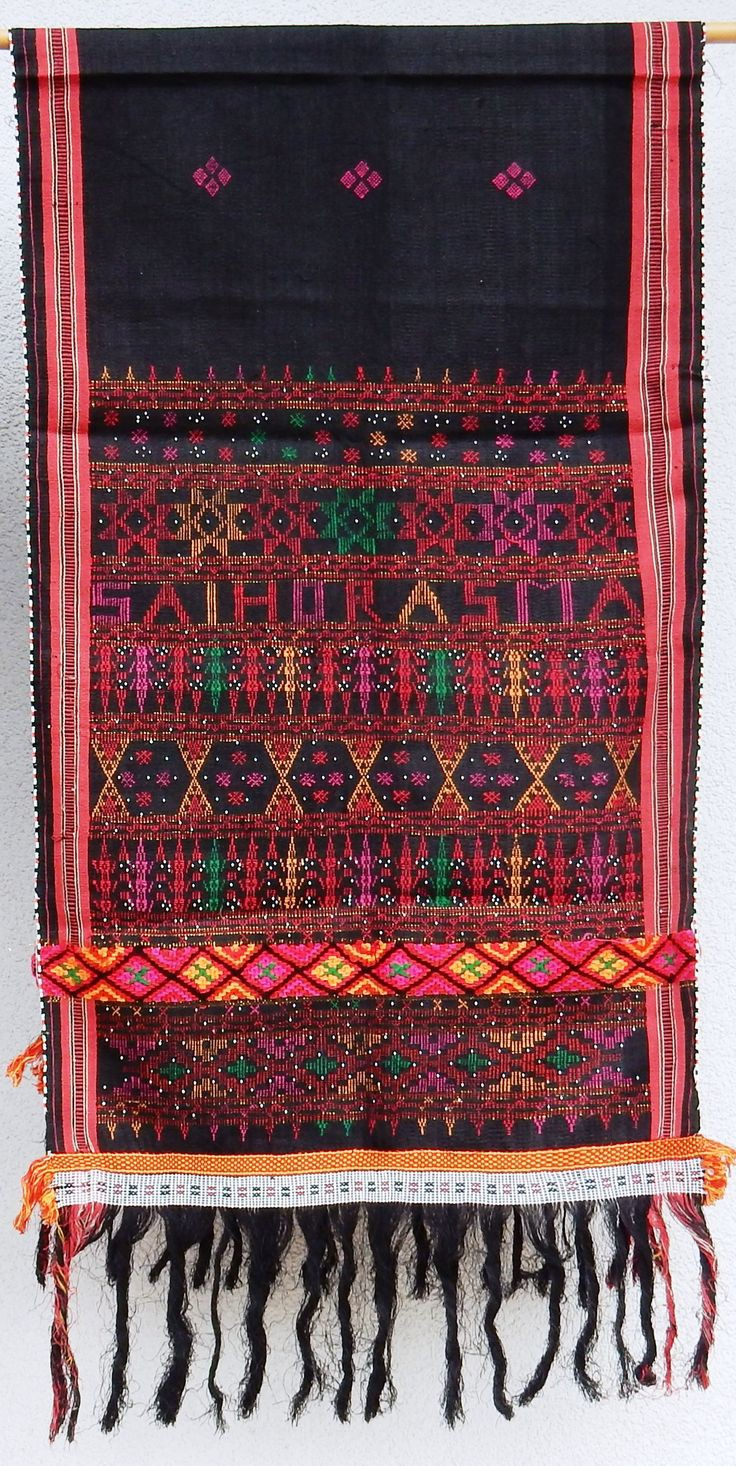
Angkola ulos
