= Ludwig Ingwer Nommensen =

German Lutheran missionary (1834–1918)

The Right Reverend Ephorus Ingwer Ludwig Nommensen
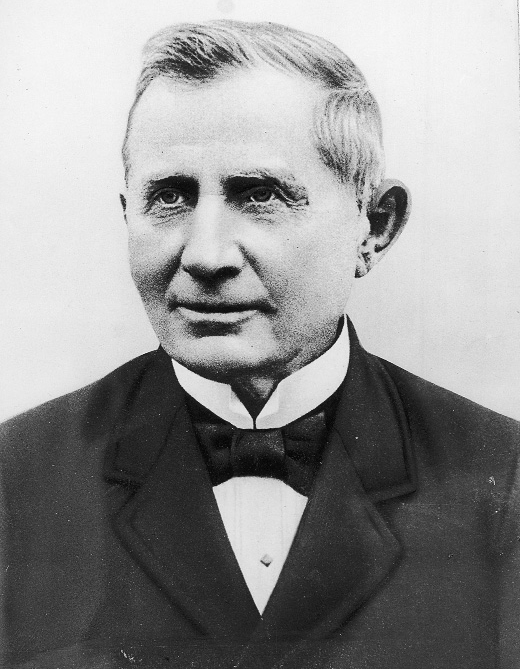
- Church: Huria Kristen Batak Protestan (HKBP)
- Installed: 1881
- Term ended: 1918
- Successor: Valentin Kessel

Personal details
- Born: 6 February 1834 Nordstrand, Duchy of Schleswig, Denmark (present-day Germany)
- Died: 23 May 1918 (aged 84) Sigumpar, Toba, Tapanoeli Residency, Dutch East Indies (present-day Indonesia)
- Buried: Sigumpar, Toba, North Sumatra
- Parents: Peter Nommensen (father); Antje Karstensen (mother)
- Spouse: Margarethe Caroline Gutbrod (m. 1866–1887); Anna Magdalene Christine Harder (m. 1892–1909)
- Children: 9

Ludwig Ingwer Nommensen (6 February 1834 – 23 May 1918) was a German Lutheran missionary to Batak lands, North Sumatra. He also translated the New Testament into the native Batak language and was the first Ephorus (bishop) of the Batak Christian Protestant Church. He is commemorated as a missionary on 7 November in the Calendar of Saints of some Lutheran churches with John Christian Frederick Heyer and Bartholomäus Ziegenbalg.

== Early life and education ==
Nommensen was born in the Nordstrand peninsula in the Duchy of Schleswig on 6 February 1834, when the area was ruled by the king of Denmark but was distinct from Denmark proper due to the link between the Duchy of Schleswig and the Duchy of Holstein, which was part of the German Confederation. He was baptized on 12 February 1834.

His father, Peter Nommensen, was a dike-lock keeper. His mother, Anna Nommensen (birth name: Antje Karstensen), was a pious homemaker who cared for the family. His family was very poor and as a child Nommensen had to work to support himself and to help his family. As a boy of seven years, he tended geese. At the age of eight years he tended sheep. At the age of nine years he was apprenticed to a roofers. After that he started to work at farming when he was ten years old.

In 1846, when he was twelve years old, a horse cart rolled over his legs, crushing them. The initial prognosis was that he would be unlikely to walk again. But after praying for recovery, four years later he was able to walk again.

An interest in Christian missionary work led to Nommensen's enrolment at the Rhenish Missionary Society seminary at Wuppertal-Barmen in 1857.

== Ministry in Sumatra ==
After completing his training at the Rhenish Missionary Society seminary, Nommensen was officially ordained as minister on 13 October 1861 and sent by the society to the Dutch East Indies. He left Barmen on 1 November 1861. Nommensen was 27 years old when he boarded the ship Pertinax on Christmas Eve, 24 December 1861, completed a grueling 142-day sea voyage from Amsterdam, and landed in the port of Padang, Sumatra, Dutch East Indies on 14 May 1862. After staying in Padang for approximately one month, Nommensen boarded another vessel (the Samuel) on 16 June 1862 to make his way via Sibolga. He arrived at the port city of Barus, Tapanuli Residency on 23 June 1862.

He began his work, including the opening of schools in the port city of Barus, which had previously been brought under Dutch control. While in Barus, he studied the Batak and Malay languages, focusing particularly on Batak customs and traditions as preparation for his Batak interior-lands mission. Realizing that Barus was not the right place for his mission, he soon left the coastal area of Barus to meet up with fellow missionaries (including Gerrit van Asselt, Friedrich Wilhelm Betz, Johann Carl Klammer and Wilhelm Heine) stationed in Sipirok on 30 August 1862, before eventually pushing into the interior Batak heartland.

On 25 October 1862, Nommensen attempted to enter Humbang (through Tukka and Rambe over Lesa hills), but the Dutch colonial government—specifically the Resident stationed in Sibolga—strictly prohibited him from settling or traveling deeper into the Batak inland, citing security concerns. At that time, the interior lands (such as Humbang and the Silindung valley) were still considered independent territories (onafhankelijk gebied) that had not yet been subdued or controlled by the Dutch military. These restrictions forced him to return to Sipirok. He used his periods in Sipirok to gather supplies, formulate his contextual ministry strategies, and plan his initial expeditions into the inland. He also utilized this time to coordinate with fellow Rhenish missionaries (including Gerrit van Asselt, Johann Carl Klammer and Wilhelm Heine) and constantly looked for ways to bypass colonial restrictions.

=== Huta Dame, Saitnihuta (1864–1873) ===
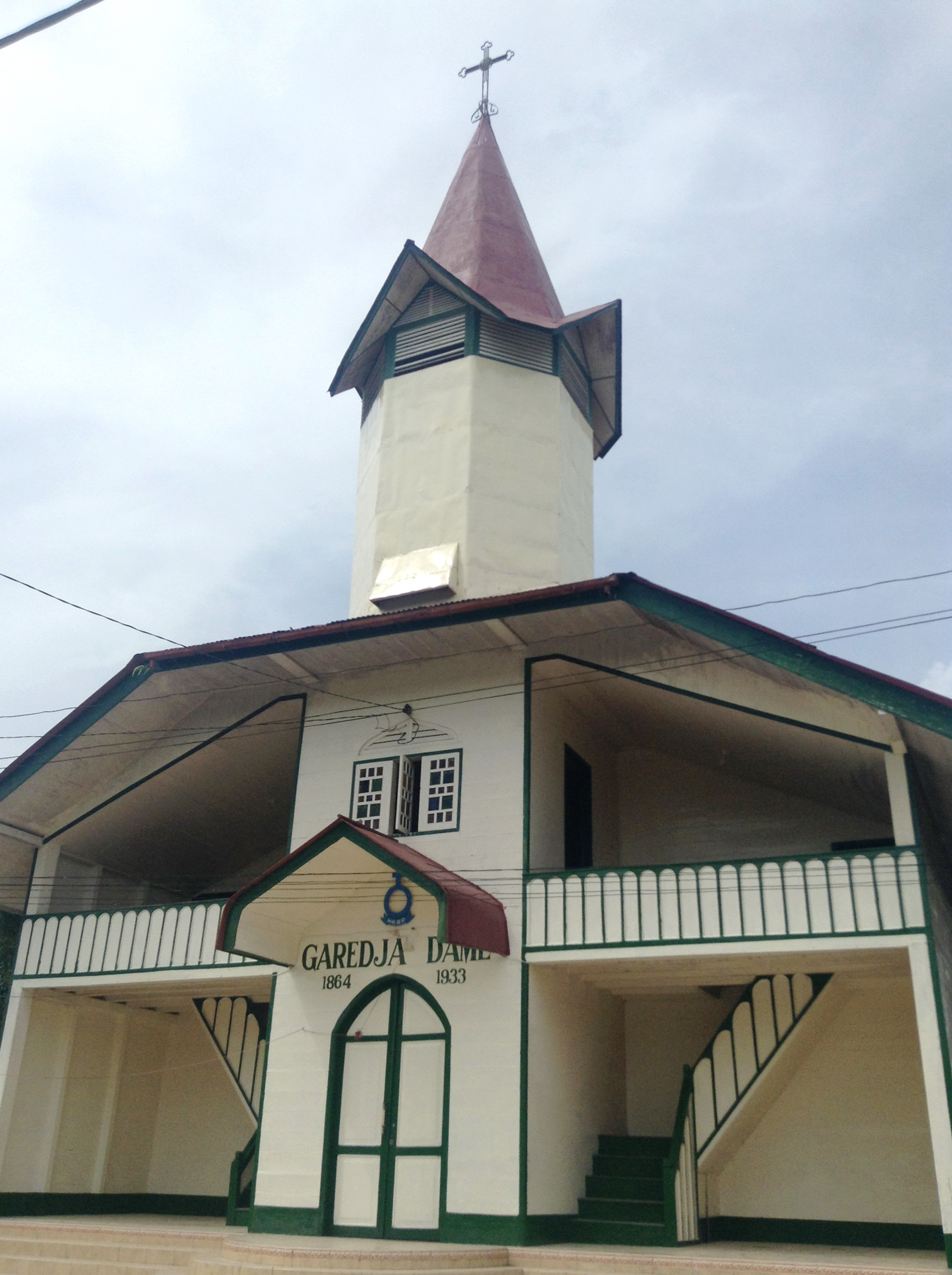
Gereja Dame (Dame Church) at Saitnihuta, Tarutung, North Tapanuli Regency, North Sumatra, the first church built by Nommensen in 1864 that became the foothold of Batak Christian Protestant Church (HKBP)

Nommensen set out from Sipirok on 7 November 1863, traveling to Silindung with a special permission from the Dutch authority. He focused his attention on the Batak people of the interior of Sumatra in Silindung valley, where he would later experience initial difficulties including numerous intimidation and assassination attempts by the locals.

==== Rejections and the establishment of Huta Dame ====
He successfully entered Silindung valley and arrived in Tarutung on 11 November 1863. During this first visit, Nommensen was received by Ompu Pasang (Ompu Tunggul) and stayed at his house, which was under the authority of Raja Pontas Lumbantobing (1835–1900). From there, Nommensen returned to Sipirok to prepare everything necessary for his ministry, before arriving back with all his equipment in Tarutung on 7 May 1864. He returned to the house of Ompu Pasang (Ompu Tunggul), but this time he was rejected and not welcomed at all.

Subsequently, he traveled to the village of Raja Aman Dari Sabungan Lumbantobing. Nommensen hoped the Raja (King) would allow him to live in the rice barn. However, the Raja was on his way to another village with his wife, who was seriously ill. Therefore, Nommensen informed the Raja of his intention via a messenger, but the Raja refused. Nommensen requested the messenger to go to Raja Aman Dari Sabungan Lumbantobing again with the message that his wife would recover when he returned to his village. When the Raja subsequently returned and his wife did indeed recover, Nommensen was allowed to stay in his dwelling.

Raja Pontas Lumbantobing initially did not accept Nommensen and tried to influence the rajas of Silindung to reject him. An assembly of local kings (Rajas) in Silindung tried to scared him off, but they did not go so far as to harm him. Meanwhile, Raja Aman Dari Sabungan Lumbantobing, after his meeting with Nommensen, also tried to influence the rajas of Silindung to accept Nommensen. Not daring to take this step of his own accord, Raja Aman Dari first availed himself of the support of three other rajas in the vicinity. One of them was Ompu Bumbung (also called Ompu Sabungan of Parbubu). Opinions around Silindung were therefore divided regarding Nommensen. Nevertheless, Nommensen remained in Tarutung and began his evangelistic work by implementing strategic cultural adaptation, diplomatic alliances with local kings, and humanitarian relief. Eventually the kings agreed to sell a piece of unfertile land prone to flooding on the border of the river Batang Toru, where he established Huta Dame (Village of Peace) on 20 May 1864.

==== Assassination attempts ====
In response to Nommensen successfully establishing Huta Dame, the local chiefs, traditional priests / sorcerer (datu) and ancestral spirit medium / shaman (sibaso) viewed Nommensen and his Huta Dame as a direct threat to their ancestral customs (adat). On 12 June 1864, Nommensen was able to complete his modest house. A few crates served as seats, and a sack of rice as a table. Nommensen had the knack of making himself at home in the simplest of circumstances. But the resistance did not cease. The shaman (sibaso) ordered someone to secretly cut the rattan ropes holding the beams of Nommensen's house together, hoping that the evening wind would cause the house to collapse and bury Nommensen beneath it. He knew that, without wind, even the partially cut ropes would hold the house up, and that there would be no wind until evening. But before the evening wind came, an earthquake struck first; Nommensen quickly left his house. Scarcely was he outside when it came crashing down. Nommensen however, was unharmed.

On 23 September 1864, the local chief, sorcerer (datu) and shaman (sibaso) organized the Bius Mangase Taon, a great annual festival celebrating the new year in the traditional parhalaan (Batak calendar), honoring the ancestors to seek blessings, and to restore fertility to the land with massive ritual sacrifice at Onan Sitahuru (center of trade market in Saitnihuta). The explicit purpose for this festival was to invite Nommensen into the festival, then stir up anti-Christian fury among the surrounding villages and plot Nommensen's death. Before a riot could break out, Nommensen stood up and pointed out that this had to be the devil's plot, for no ancestor would want a human sacrifice, just as no grandfather would desire the death of his grandchild. His convincing words calmed the crowd down. Nommensen survived unscathed.

After the failure of the earlier attempts, the sorcerer (datu) was also gave poisoned food to Nommensen. The sorcerer came to the kitchen and asked for the cook to fetch Nommensen. While the boy (a helper) was away, the sorcerer poured a deadly poison into the cooking pot. It was the poison of the mypach tree, which is guaranteed to kill within a short time. He then hid behind a tree to observe the effect from a distance, and watched as the missionary ate his porridge and even gave some to his dog. The dog died instantly—but Nommensen remained healthy; though he did retain a very sensitive stomach for the rest of his life. Nommensen was poisoned a second time in much the same way, yet suffered no harm. Months later, before he was baptized in 1865, the sorcerer came to Nommensen and confessed his deed: "You must be a much greater sorcerer than I am! This poison kills any human being." Nommensen replied: "I am not a sorcerer at all. But I have a God who is stronger than all sorcery and poisons."

==== First converts ====
Nommensen’s missionary efforts soon bore fruit. On 27 August 1865, he baptized his first converts, eight adults and five children, comprising two families from the Hutagalung clan, and one family each from the Sarumpaet and Nasution clans. The first two families belonged to the ruling clans of their respective villages. Among these early converts to Christianity, two figures stood out: Maja Hutagalung (baptized as Abraham) was a former traditional priest/ sorcerer (datu), while Ama ni Panggomal Sarumpaet (baptized as Isaac) was an ancestral spirit medium / shaman (sibaso), the two figures who initially opposed and openly incited the local population to kill Nommensen. Most early converts who faced discrimination from their families and villages had to leave their homes and come to live with Nommensen in Huta Dame.

In early March 1866, Nommensen's fiancée, Margarethe Caroline Gutbrod, arrived at the port city of Sibolga accompanied by fellow missionary Peter Hinrich Johannsen before her wedding to Nommensen on 16 March 1866.

The isolation of the small Christian communities was of short duration due to the conversion of three rajas late in 1867: Raja Pontas Lumbantobing (baptized as Obaja), Raja Ompu Salisi Hutauruk (baptized as Musa), and Raja Panalungkup Lumbantobing (baptized as Nikodemus). Of these three, Raja Pontas Lumbantobing became the staunchest supporter of the Batak Mission and Nommensen’s closest ally in the following decades.

=== Pearaja, Tarutung (1873–1885) ===
Church, school and hospital of the Christian mission at Pearaja, Tarutung, Tapanuli Residency (ca.1910)

In 1873, Nommensen established his home, a school, and a church building in Pearaja, Tarutung, on a land that Raja Pontas Lumbantobing had donated (customary gift/grant) after he was baptized. This complex served as the foundational base for his missionary work in the Silindung valley and eventually became the official headquarters of the Batak Christian Protestant Church (Huria Kristen Batak Protestan / HKBP).

In 1874, he translated Luther’s Small Catechism into Batak, including The Gospel according to Luke (Barita na uli na sinuratkon ni Lucas).

In May 1876, Nommensen, Peter Hinrich Johannsen, and August Simoneit left the Silindung valley to explore the Great Toba area for the first time. Passing through Bahal Batu as well as Lobu Siregar, they encountered no obstacles; on the contrary, some of the local chiefs even welcomed them hospitably. They reached the surrounding mountain range at eleven o'clock on the morning of 13 May 1876. On the same day, Simoneit returned to Silindung. The two remaining missionaries then asked the chiefs of Balige for permission, and they successfully reached the massive local market in Balige. That same day, Raja Pontas Lumbantobing also arrived, and they stayed in Balige for three days. However, on their return journey, they met a hostile crowd and had to take refuge in the village of Butar which was then besieged, allegedly by forces of Sisingamangaraja XII. Raja Pontas Lumbantobing had to intervene to negotiate their safe return to Silindung.

==== Expansion into Humbang ====
In October 1876, he assigned Wilhelm Metzler and Heinrich Püse for their very first mission to open missionary station on the Humbang plain in Bahal Batu with the help of local leader Raja Partaonangin / Partaon-Angin.

By 1876, it was reported the total number of baptized converts had reached about 2,000 Batak Christians in Silindung region. And in 1877, Nommensen translated The Gospel according to St. John from the original Greek into the Toba Batak language. It was later published through the British and Foreign Bible Society.

==== Toba war ====
In January 1878, he and his fellow missionaries, and the Christian Batak people themselves, were threatened by the Batak priest king Sisingamangaraja XII, who, with support from Aceh, was involved in a war against the Dutch occupants. Due to these threats and concerns for the safety of the missionaries and the indigenous Batak Christians in Silindung and Bahal Batu, Nommensen requested security assistance from the colonial government in late January 1878. This security force arrived in Silindung on 6 February 1878, and also in Bahal Batu on 15 February 1878. Sisingamangaraja XII subsequently declared war on 16 February 1878, and then attacked Bahal Batu in late February 1878. During the clash with colonial troops, Sisingamangaraja XII's forces were repelled by colonial troops. Consequently, Silindung was declared by the Dutch colonial as the Dutch East Indies' territory on 15 March 1878, followed by Bahal Batu on 16 March 1878.

In the subsequent military expedition against Singamangaraja XII, known as the First Toba War, Nommensen played a prominent role in serving the colonial army as an interpreter and cultural consultant. Nommensen himself laid out his involvement in the war in a report that was published in BRMG 12, 1878:361–81, in which he explained that his involvement was aimed to save lives and to avoid Dutch brutal punitive action against local villages. After the war, Nommensen was seen by Batak people as the one who could protect them against Dutch influence.

In the same year, 1878, Nommensen completed the first translation of the New Testament into the Batak language in Batak script and Latin script.

In February 1880, Nommensen and his wife Margarethe Caroline Gutbrod left Silindung, and departed from the port of Padang, Sumatra, in April 1880 to return to Germany for his first furlough, due to her severe illness. They arrived in Germany in June 1880. However, she had to remain behind when he returned to his missionary work in Sumatra in late 1881, where she later died in Gütersloh, Germany on 29 March 1887 before he was able to return to see her again.

==== First Ephorus ====
Ludwig Ingwer Nommensen (ca. 1880s–1890s)

In 1881, while in Barmen, Germany, Nommensen formally introduced the first Church Constitution and Church Order (Gemeindeordnung / Tata Gereja) for the Batak congregations. This document established a cohesive organizational structure, merging local Batak cultural customs with Christian governance. Nommensen intentionally designed a Volkskirche (people's church) rather than copying Western church frameworks. He adapted the structure to respect the traditional Batak clan governance (marga) and local customary law (adat), contextualizing Christian beliefs within their existing societal framework. The Rhenish Missionary Society (RMG) then officially appointed Nommensen as the first Ephorus (bishop or moderator) of the unified Batak church.

==== Expansion into Great Toba ====
Mission Church in Balige where the first missionaries settled in 1881

In the same year, around 14 May 1881, the leaders of Balige, including Raja Batutahan Siahaan and Raja Bajahuring Siahaan, traveled to the mission headquarters in Pearaja, Tarutung, to meet Nommensen to petition for a permanent Christian missionary presence, a minister, and a church to be established in their region of Toba Balige. Initially, after a missionary first visit to Balige in 1876, Nommensen repeatedly rejected the idea of placing a missionary or establishing a permanent church structure in Balige because he believed it was too dangerous, due to the local populations in Balige viewing Western missionaries not as religious teachers, but as political intelligence agents and active co-conspirators of Dutch imperialism, and because the area was an active war zone. While Nommensen was on his furlough in Germany, the kings negotiated with the acting missionaries stationed at Pearaja. During this pivotal meeting, the Balige leaders presented a signed "letter of protection for the lives and property of the missionaries" ("surat panghangkungion ni hosa dohot barang ni angka tuan pandita"). Convinced by their sincerity, the mission agreed to their requests and, on 10 June 1881, dispatched missionaries (including Gustav Pilgram and Valentin Kessel) to Balige to establish the church presence that was formally recognized on 10 July 1881.

Upon his return to Pearaja, Nommensen immediately traveled down to Balige alongside missionary Johann Schrey and arrived in Balige on 21 January 1882. During this visit, Nommensen surveyed the number of new believers Pilgram had gathered and formally gave his blessing to build a permanent church structure, which he returned to dedicate on 26 April 1883.

In early 1884, he assigned Peter Bonn to establish a mission station in Toba Laguboti. After the local leaders Raja Ompu Tinggi and Raja Ompu Timbang gave their permission, the Laguboti station and church was established on 26 August 1884.

=== Laguboti, Toba (1885–1890) ===
Batak church in Laguboti, established in 1884 (ca.1910)

Vocational school in Laguboti, established in 1907 (ca.1920)

In 1885, serious friction erupted directly between missionary Peter Bonn and Raja Ompu Timbang in Laguboti. The disagreement centered around the heavy-handed way the mission station was expanding, which offended the traditional authority of the local chiefs. Friction occurred when the RMG attempted to formally expand the mission compound (Pargodungan) to include a permanent school and medical post, it triggered an internal community dispute. Some traditional elders (Raja Adat) who practiced the indigenous belief system grew suspicious that the permanent allocation of ancestral land (ulayat land) to foreign missionaries would erode their traditional authority and pave the way for Dutch colonial administrative control.

Nommensen personally left Pearaja came to Laguboti in late 1885 to step in and handle the immediate fallout. In order to de-escalate the conflict with Raja Ompu Timbang, Nommensen officially reassigned Peter Bonn to Pangaloan and took over Laguboti station himself. Nommensen resided in Laguboti until he moved to Sigumpar in 1890.

=== Sigumpar, Toba (1890–1918) ===
(front; left to right) Valentin Kessel, Gustav Pilgram, Ludwig Ingwer Nommensen, Johann Carl Klammer, Johannes Warneck with fellow missionaries during the 1899 Conference in the Batak Lands

In 1890, he moved north to the village of Sigumpar, Toba near Laguboti. The area had greater Islamic influences, but Nommensen remained successful in building an indigenous Batak church.

In 1892, Nommensen returned to Germany for his second furlough. During this time, he met and married his second wife, Anna Magdalene Christine Harder, on 18 November 1892 in Itzehoe, Germany. He remained in Germany until early 1893 before returning to Sigumpar with his wife to continue his missionary work.

==== The expansion into Samosir Island ====
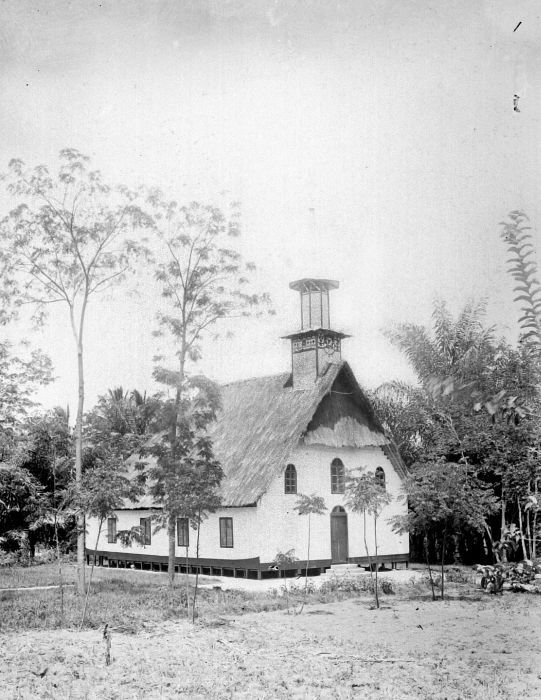
Batak Church at Nainggolan, Samosir Island (ca.1900–1925)

In March 1893, Nommensen organized a definitive observation mission to cross Lake Toba. Alongside pioneering missionaries Johannes Warneck, August Bruch, and Gustav Pilgram, Nommensen boarded traditional Batak boats (solu). They landed at Huta Sipinggan (Sipinggan village), Nainggolan on Samosir Island. Over three days, they observed local political dynamics and gauged the willingness of the regional kings (rajas) to accept western education and religion. Following the initial survey, Nommensen returned to his base in Sigumpar to draft a blueprint for Samosir.

On 3 May 1893, acting in his capacity as Ephorus, Nommensen officially commissioned Johannes Warneck to establish the first permanent mission post (Pos Zending) on the island. Warneck arrived to settle in Nainggolan, Samosir on 6 May 1893, officially opening Samosir to systemic missionary expansion. According to reports published by Warneck in the Allgemeine Missions-Zeitschrift (AMZ, 1894), the 1893 incursion was catalyzed by an informal visit from Samosir elders to Nommensen’s mainland stations. The island leaders, intrigued by the socio-political adjustments and educational schools built in Silindung, formally requested that a teacher or Pandita (pastor) be dispatched to their territory. This Samosir Island mission followed with the establishment of the next posts and churches by Heinrich Püse at Palipi in 1898, then later by Karl Lotz at Pangururan in 1911 and Ludwig Bregenstroth at Ambarita in 1914.

==== The expansion into Sumatra's East Coast Residency ====
By 1903, the Rhenish Missionary Society (RMG) officially expanded its missionary scope northward into Sumatra's East Coast Residency through a telegram sent by RMG inspector Dr. August Schreiber on 16 March 1903 with the message: "Tole! Den Timorlanden das Evangelium!" ("Go! Bring the Gospel to the Eastern Lands!"). To execute the order, Nommensen assigned missionary August Theis and native Batak teachers to establish a church at Nagori Mariah Bandar in 1903; assigned evangelist Josiah Hutabarat and administrative circle overseers to establish a church at Tebing Tinggi in 1906; assigned Eduard Müller to establish a church at Pematangsiantar on 29 September 1907; and assigned native Batak evangelist to establish a church at Binjai in 1908. Nommensen himself also established a church in Tanjung Balai in 1910. In the same year of 1910, he also visited Medan, the capital city of Sumatra's East Coast Residency to meet Ds. J. Brink and Ds. Klaassen (from the Protestantsche Kerk), before he assigned evangelist Josiah Hutabarat to establish a church in Medan on 1 August 1912.

During the period of his expansion mission in Sumatra's East Coast Residency, the University of Bonn awarded him an honorary doctorate (Doctor Honoris Causa) on 6 February 1904 in recognition of his extensive linguistic, social, and theological contributions to the Batak people. His wife Christine Harder passed away in Sigumpar, Sumatra on 26 July 1909; and the Dutch colonial government officially recognized his stabilizing presence and humanitarian impact by promoting him as an Officer in the Order of Orange-Nassau (Officier in de Orde van Oranje-Nassau) on 13 October 1911.

==== Death ====
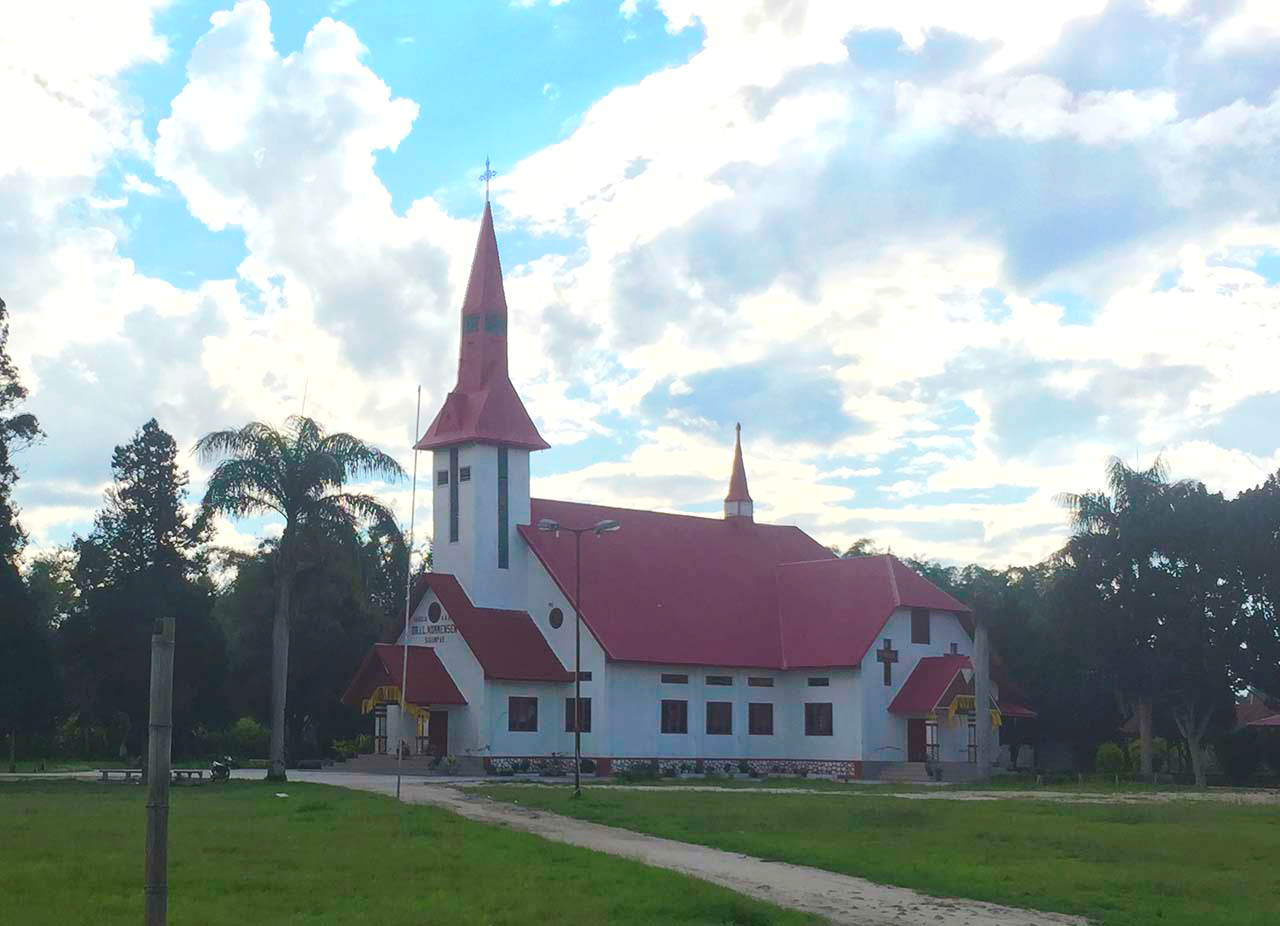
HKBP DR IL Nommensen church in Sigumpar, Toba Regency, North Sumatra. Directly behind the HKBP Sigumpar Church lies the Tomb of Missionary Dr. I.L. Nommensen, where he was buried alongside several of his fellow missionaries and family members.

On the morning of 23 May 1918, Ludwig Ingwer Nommensen died in Sigumpar, Sumatra. Roughly 40,000 members traveled on foot and via traditional boats (solu) to reach Sigumpar for his burial. By the time of his death the church numbered 180,000 members. There were also 34 Batak pastors and 788 teacher-preachers across 500 congregations. Today most Toba Batak Christians belong to the Batak Christian Protestant Church (HKBP), the largest Lutheran church denominations in Indonesia and in Southeast Asia.

== Family ==
Personnel card of L.I. Nommensen with his spouse details (Margarethe Gutbrod and Christine Harder) from VEM Archive and Museum Foundation Wuppertal.

Nommensen was married twice and had at least nine children.

His first marriage with Margarethe Caroline Gutbrod was from 1866 until her death in 1887. From this marriage they had six children:

- Benoni Nommensen – Died in infancy at approximately 7 days old.
- Anna Nommensen – Died in early childhood at approximately 1 year old.
- Lucia Nommensen (born in 1868) – Married a fellow missionary.
- Ludwig Nommensen (born in 1870) – later migrated as a merchant to Brazil.
- Christian Nommensen (born in 1872) – later became a planter and was tragically murdered in Sumatra in 1901.
- Jonathan Nommensen (born on 27 November 1873) – followed his father's footsteps to become an evangelical missionary in Sumatra, serving in Laguboti and Sigumpar until his death on 30 January 1950. Jonathan was married to fellow missionary Frieda Nommensen (birth name: Frieda Hartwig, born: 22 February 1876, death: 16 April 1930). His second marriage in 1931 with Missionary Sister: Lore Werner (born: 1898, death: 1988).

His second marriage with Anna Magdalene Christine Harder was from 1892 until her death in 1909. From this marriage they had three children:

- Marcus Nathaniel Nommensen (born on 3 October 1893) – He served as a soldier in Germany and died during World War I in 1916.
- Margarethe Nommensen (born on 30 May 1896) – She became a teacher in Germany and died in 1946.
- Maria Nommensen (born in 1902).

== Honours ==
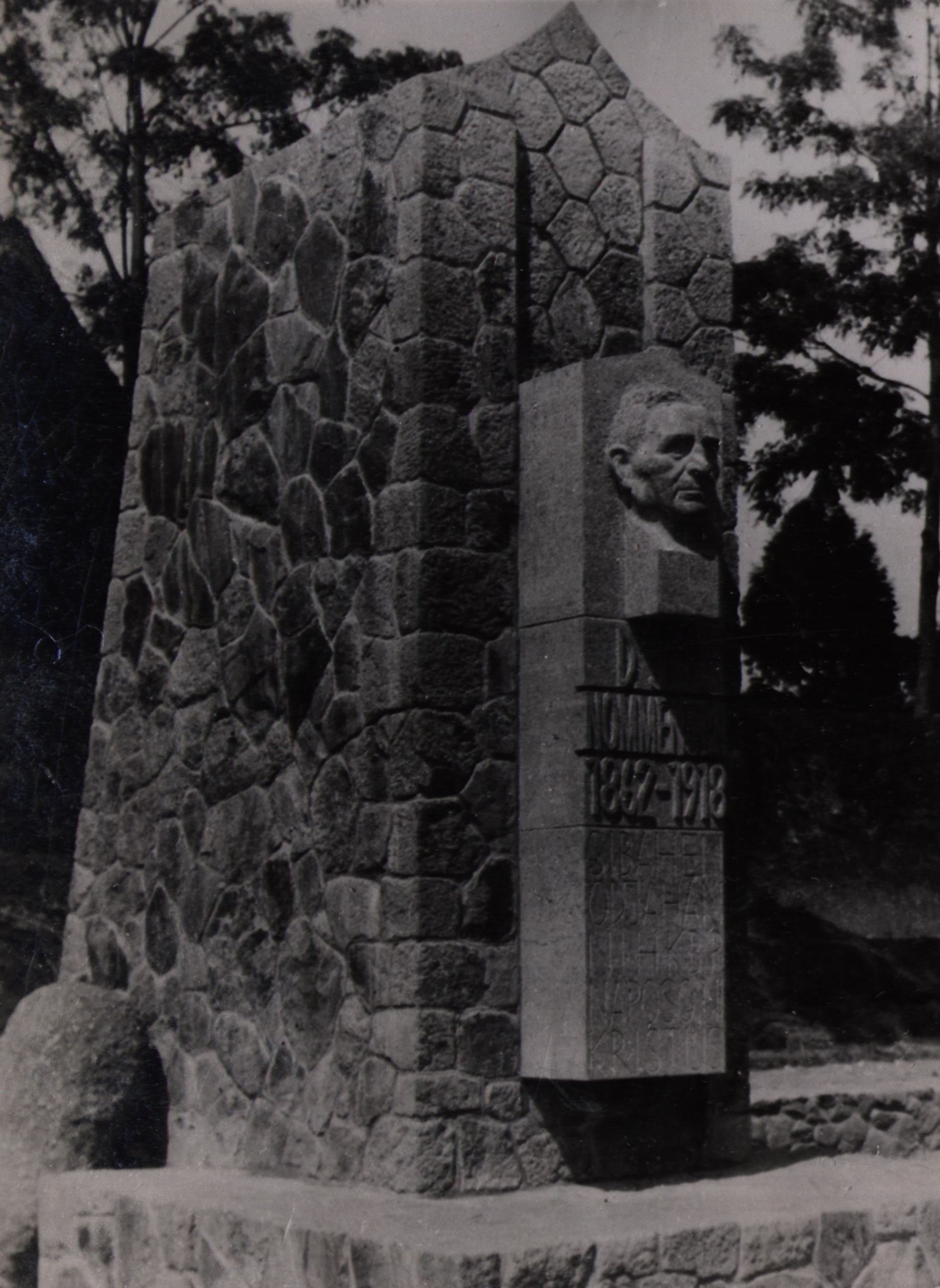
The monument of Nommensen at Silindung valley, Tapanuli Residency, by prominent sculptor Erich Kuhn that was dedicated on 27 December 1932 and later destroyed by Japanese soldiers in 1942 during the Japanese occupation of the Dutch East Indies

During and post his ministry service, Nommensen was awarded and given honoraria as follows:

- Knight (Ridder) of the Order of Orange-Nassau: Awarded in 1893 in recognition of his extensive societal, educational, and religious contributions in the Dutch East Indies (Sumatra).
- Honorary Doctorate (doctorate of theology): Conferred by the University of Bonn on 6 February 1904 for his theological and translation work (including translating the New Testament into the Toba Batak language).
- Officer (Officier) of the Order of Orange-Nassau: Promoted on 13 October 1911 for his lifelong meritorious service and continued leadership among the Batak community.
- The Batak Christian University at Medan and Pematang Siantar was named Nommensen HKBP University in 1954.
- Bishop Stephen Neill (1900–1984), in his History of Christian Missions, described Nommensen as "one of the most powerful missionaries of whom we have record anywhere" (page 348).
- Another source wrote, "Nommensen may have been one of the most successful missionaries ever to preach the gospel" (Ambassadors for Christ, ed. by J. Woodbridge, page 146).

== Works and editions ==
- Luther's Small Catechism (Tigor ni poda) – Translated into the Toba Batak language in 1874.
- The Gospel according to Luke (Barita na uli na sinuratkon ni Lucas) – translated out of the original Greek into Batak (Toba) language, published by Rehoboth-zending-pers in 1874.
- Tobasch Spelboekje – A Toba Batak spelling and primer booklet published by Landsdrukkerij in multiple editions (1877 and 1885).
- The Gospel according to St. John: translated out of the original Greek into Batta (Toba), the language of the Batta in the island of Sumatra, issued in 1877, published by For the British and the Foreign Bible Society, printed by Roeloffzen & Hubner in 1894.
- The New Testament of Our Lord and Savior Jesus Christ – Translated out of the original Greek into Batta (Toba), the language of the Batta in the island of Sumatra (in Batak script), completed in 1878, published by For the British and Foreign Bible Society, printed by R. L. Friedrichs & Comp in 1879.
- Padan Na Imbaru Ni Tuhata Djesus Christus: The New Testament of Our Lord and Savior Jesus Christ — Translated out of the original Greek into Batta (Toba), the language of the Batta in the island of Sumatra (in latin script), completed in 1878, published by For the British and Foreign Bible Society, printed by R. L. Friedrichs & Comp in 1885.
- Bible Stories (Djamita sian Hata ni Debata) – Published in Toba Batak language in 1882.
- Berichte an seine Freunde (Reports to His Friends) – A three-part series of booklets published in 1882, 1883, and 1886 detailing his missionary journey and experiences.
- Short Articles and Journals – Around forty shorter written accounts and reports contributed directly to European missionary journals.

== Gallery ==
Nommensen with missionary Sisters of the Batak Mission, 1914.

Nommensen's picture with Issac Newton, Friedrich Nietzsche, and Maarten Noordtzij in the page of Christian Encyclopedia for the Dutch People, Volume 4 (Christelijke encyclopædie voor het Nederlandsche volk deel 4), page 411, published in 1926–1931

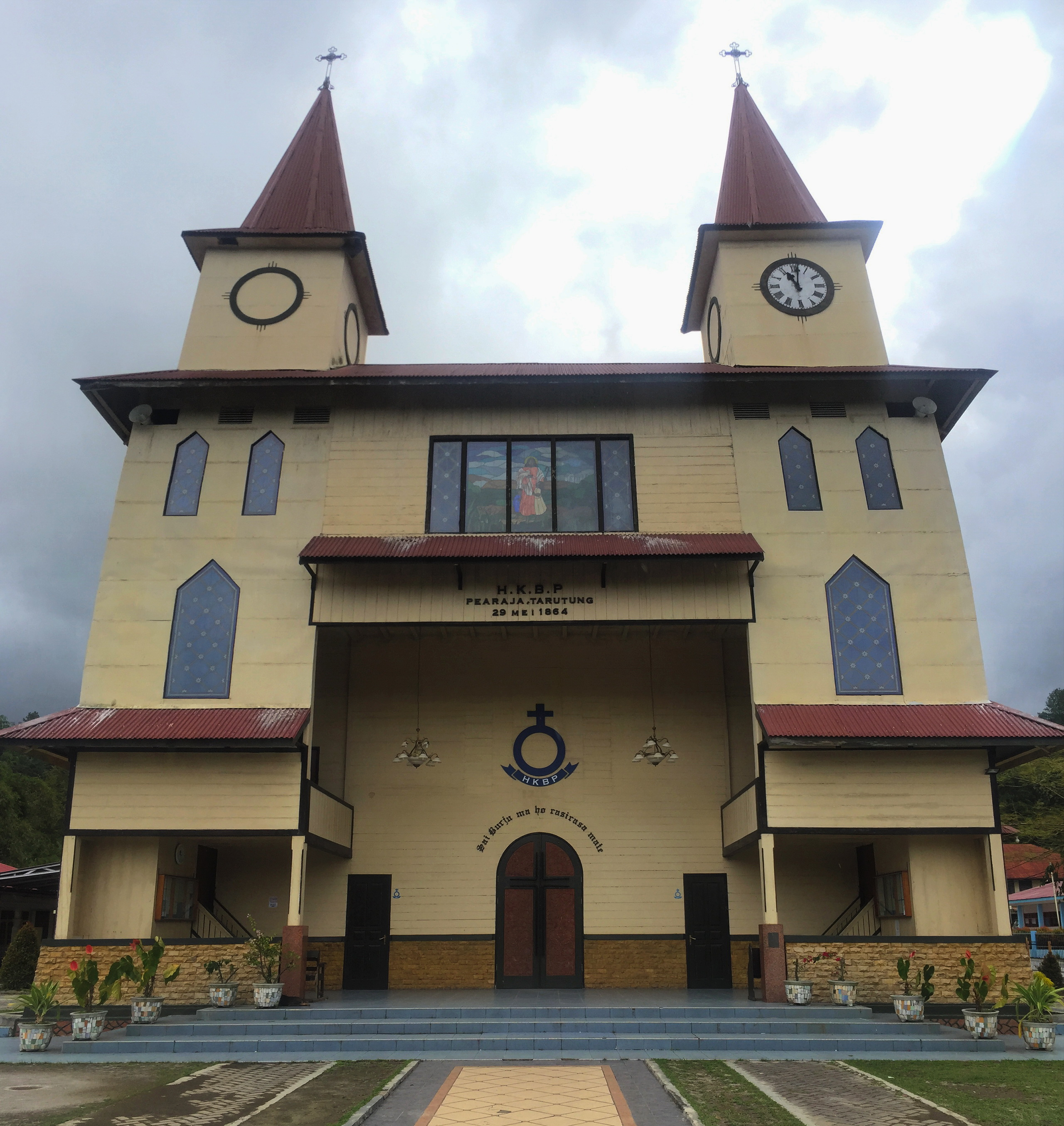
HKBP Pearaja church in Tarutung, North Tapanuli Regency, North Sumatra, built by Nommensen in 1864 and inaugurated on 10 September 1873

HKBP Sipahutar church at Sipahutar district, North Tapanuli, North Sumatra established in 1881 by missionaries Ludwig Hanstein and Paulus Lumbantobing, commissioned by Nommensen. Remodeled in 1910

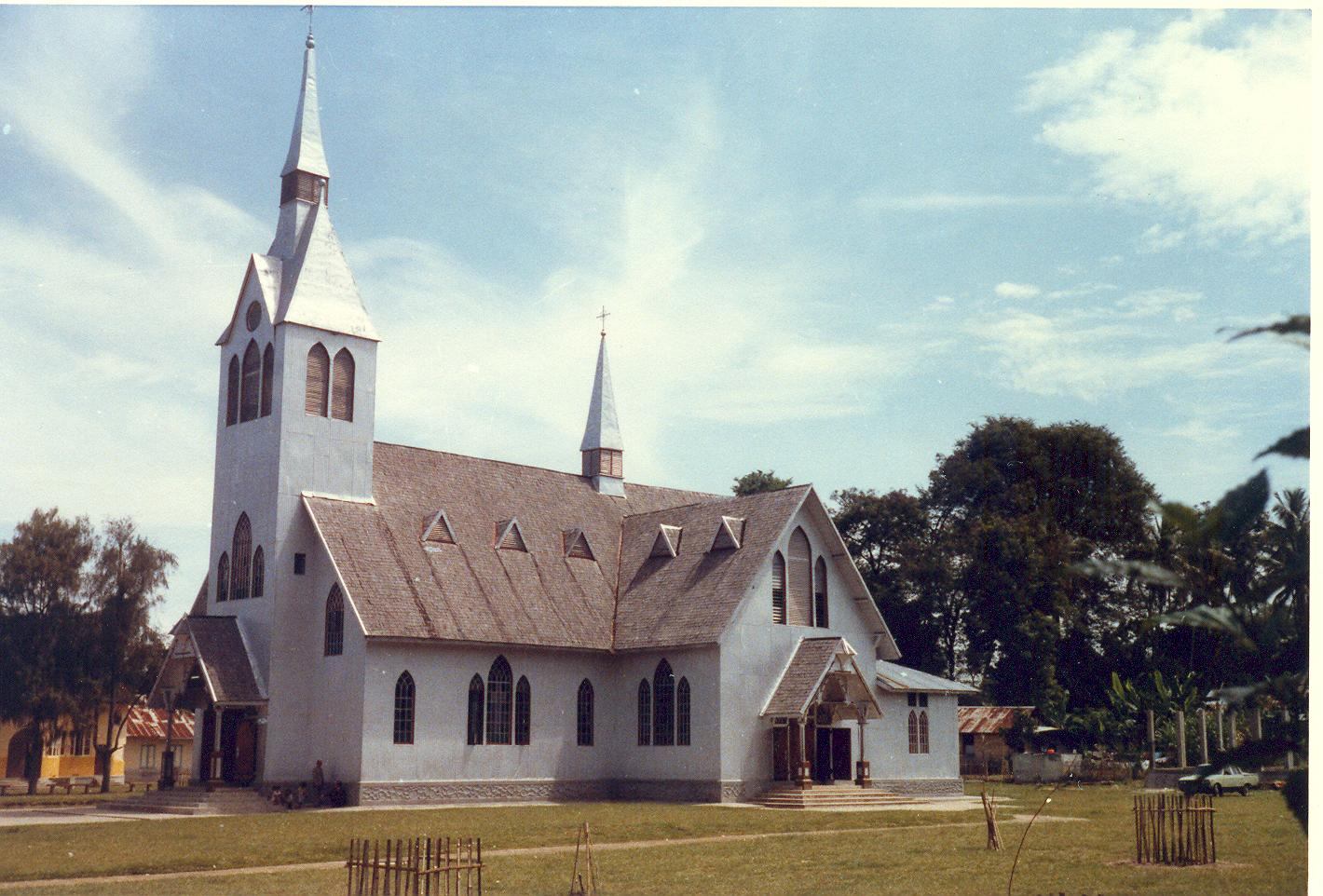
HKBP Balige church in Balige, Toba Regency, North Sumatra, inaugurated by Karl Hermann Weissenbruch on 23 April 1923 (Original church was established by Gustav Pilgram in 1881, dedicated by L.I. Nommensen in 1883)

Nommensen memorial stone at the entrance to the St. Vincent Church (St. Vinzenz-Kirche), Odenbüll, Nordstrand, Germany

== Sources ==
- Scott W. Sunquist, ed., Dictionary of Asian Christianity (Grand Rapids, 2001), p. 608
- Gustav Menzel, Ein Reiskorn auf der Strasse: Ludwig I. Nommensen, "Apostel der Batak", (1984)
- I.L. Nommensen. Endgültiger Bericht über den Krieg in Sumatra. BRMG (Berichte der Rheinischen Missions-Gesellschaft) 1878 (12): 361-381
- Werner Raupp, "Nommensen, Ludwig Ingwer". In: Biographisch-Bibliographisches Kirchenlexikon (BBKL). Band 6, Bautz, Herzberg 1993, ISBN 3-88309-044-1, Sp. 1002–1006.
