= Gerrit van Asselt =

Dutch Lutheran missionary (1834–1918)

The Reverend Gerrit van Asselt

Orders
- Ordination: 17 May 1856 by Ermelo Mission (Zending Ermelo)

Personal details
- Born: 23 June 1832 Elspeet, Netherlands
- Died: 3 August 1910 (aged 78) Vohwinkel, Germany
- Parents: Helmert Hendriksen van Asselt (father); Ariana Dirks Drost (mother)
- Spouse: Gerardina Arnolda Malga (m. 1862–1901); Catharina Auguste Wolfschmidt (m. 1902–1910)

Gerrit van Asselt (1832–1910) was a Dutch Reformed Christian pastor from the Netherlands who was sent by the Ermelo missionary agency as a missionary to Sumatra, Dutch East Indies (present-day: Indonesia) in 1857. He was the first Dutch missionary sent to Batak Lands, ahead of other German missionaries who were only sent by the RMG missionary agency in 1861.

== Early life and education ==
Gerrit van Asselt was born in Elspeet, on the Northern Veluwe, Netherlands on 23 June 1832. He grew up as the ninth of twelve children in a devout agricultural family. His father, Helmert Hendriksen van Asselt, eventually became a respected and deeply religious elder in the community after a period of intense spiritual struggle, while his mother Ariana Dirks Drost, was known as a tender and prayerful woman who deeply influenced her children's spiritual awareness. His oldest brother Henry van Asselt (1817–1902) was a Dutch immigrant to the US in 1847, one of the first Europeans to settle the area that is now Seattle, Washington.

In 1852, when he was 20 years old, he began studying under the guidance of a schoolmaster in Elspeet and a paternal friend, alongside advice from a minister's son. He attended Seminary of the Scottish Missionary Church (Amsterdam), and ordained by Ermelo Mission (Zending Ermelo) as Missionary (Zendeling) on 17 May 1856. After being ordained as a missionary pastor, he was equipped with the research findings of Franz Wilhelm Junghuhn (1840) on the Batak Lands and Batak language lessons through the research of Herman Neubronner van der Tuuk. In Amsterdam, he also received initial training and began studying Malay. For his practical training, he worked as a pupil-teacher (kwekeling) at the Haveloze School (School for the Destitute) run by Master Feringa in Amsterdam.

== Ministry in Sumatra ==
Gerrit van Asselt arrived in Padang, Sumatra, Dutch East Indies on 2 December 1856. Upon his arrival, he requested to the authority of Sumatra's West Coast Residency to work in the Padang Highlands, but it was rejected due to religious tensions. To ensure his safety, the Governor of Sumatra's West Coast Residency advised Van Asselt to go to the colonial post in Batak lands, Sipirok, Tapanuli Residency—to work as a coffee overseer (plantation supervisor) for a fixed salary.

=== Sipirok, Subdistrict of Angkola (1857–1861) ===
He arrived in Sipirok, Subdistrict of Angkola (Onderafdeeling Ankola), Tapanuli Residency on 26 January 1857 to start his work as a coffee overseer (plantation supervisor). In this position, he could master the local language by learning the language from the people's mouths, while still having time to preach the gospel.

Van Asselt worked alone in Batak Lands for two years (1857–1859), before finally two other missionaries from the Ermelo Missionary Congregation: Friedrich Wilhelm Betz and J. Dammerboer came to follow him to Batak Lands in 1859, and settled with him in Sipirok. However, the combination of missionary work and overseer duties was broken off after three years, according to Van Asselt: the two roles did not go well together—because the overseer duties involved overseeing the forced cultivation of coffee under the Dutch Cultuurstelsel (Cultivation System), as well as supervising Heerendiensten (forced road construction labor) known locally as "Rodi". In December 1859, he resigned from overseer work to devote himself entirely to his missionary work.

After five years of hard work, Van Asselt finally witnessed a positive sign of his strenuous labor. On Easter, Sunday 31 March 1861, he baptized the child of the Betz couple alongside two young Bataks who were pupils at his school; the two students were given the baptismal names Simon Siregar and Jakobus Tampubolon. This ceremony took place in Parau Sorat, near Sipirok. On 28 August 1861, J. D. Ph. Koster and Van Dalen, two reinforcement missionaries from the Ermelo Missionary Congregation, arrived in Sipirok and joined Gerrit van Asselt.

On 7 October 1861, Gerrit van Asselt and Friedrich Wilhelm Betz held a meeting with two German missionaries Johann Carl Klammer and Wilhelm Heine from the Rhenish Missionary Society (Rheinische Missionsgesellschaft, or RMG). The meeting was held to decide that the RMG would officially begin its work in Batak Land, and to divide their territories—where Van Asselt will be settled in Parau Sorat, Betz in Bungabundar, Heine in Sipirok, and Klammer in Simangumban, Pahae. The date of this meeting has since been recognised by Batak Christian Protestant Church (HKBP) as the date of its foundation.

From 1861 onward, Gerrit van Asselt and Friedrich Wilhelm Betz worked for the RMG in Sumatra, while J Dammerboer, Koster and Van Dalen remained with the Ermelo missionary congregation.

=== Aek Sarulla, Pahae (1861–1864) ===
On 20 December 1861, Van Asselt left Sipirok and traveled out to establish the post in Parau Sorat, but he found that the local rulers and inhabitants of Parau Sorat were extremely hostile, bound by a sworn pact among 30 kings (rajas) to block and kill any 'white-eyed' foreigner. Because of this fierce opposition and active threat to safety, he could not settle there.

Subsequently, he traveled into the independent region of Aek Sarulla, Pahae valley. Upon arriving in Aek Sarulla in late December 1861, the local king, Raja Tinjungan was friendly and willing to receive him. Consequently, Van Asselt negotiated permission with the king (raja) to settle and redirected his pioneer efforts, and established his new station in Aek Sarulla instead.

In February 1862, Van Asselt received a message that his fiancee Gerardina Arnolda Malga (Dina Malga) was traveling from Amsterdam to Padang, Sumatra, accompanied by another pioneer missionary from RMG Ludwig Ingwer Nommensen (1834–1918). She arrived in Padang in May 1862, then arrived at the port city of Sibolga in June 1862, before her wedding to Van Asselt in Sibolga on 28 July 1862. After getting married they officially settled and worked in Aek Sarulla.

In late 1862, Ludwig Ingwer Nommensen visited Van Asselt's station at Aek Sarulla. They frequently coordinated with other Rhenish Missionary Society missionaries (like Heine, Klammer, Betz, and Schreiber) during regional conferences to plan the expansion mission into the Batak inland regions that later will be led by Nommensen.

On 14 September 1863, he opened a school on a hill behind their house at Aek Sarulla, which also had to serve as a church. However, he decided to abandon/relocate the station due to an earthquake and health reasons, moving out by 25 January 1864.

=== Pangaloan, Pahae (1864–1875) ===
Van Asselt and his wife moved into their new station in Pangaloan, Pahae valley on 25 January 1864, where they built a new permanent residence and mission station. After relocating to Pangaloan, they transferred their school building in October 1864, and on Sunday, 23 October 1864, they held their first worship service in it.

He undertook various professional and missionary journeys from his main stations to neighboring regions, including Silindung, Sipoholon, Sigompulon, and Sibolga. They remained stationed in Pangaloan until he officially ended his service in Sumatra in 1875. He and his wife left Pangaloan on 29 June 1875 to return to Europe.

Today most Batak Christians belong to the Batak Christian Protestant Church (HKBP), the largest Lutheran church denominations in Indonesia and in Southeast Asia.

== Family ==
Gerrit van Asselt and his wife Gerardina Arnolda Malga (ca.1860s–1880s)

Gerrit van Asselt was married twice. His first marriage with Gerardina Arnolda Malga was from 28 July 1862 until her death on 30 September 1901. His second marriage with Catharina Auguste Wolfschmidt was from 22 October 1902 until his death on 3 August 1910.

== Works and editions ==
- Angkola Batak Translations of New Testament & Hymnals: Working closely with fellow missionary W.F. Betz,. published by Rhenish Missionary Society (Rheinische Missionsgesellschaft) in 1860s – 1870s.
- Vader en Zoon. Twee Batta-Christenen ("Father and Son: Two Batak Christians"): A biographical account detailing the stories of early local converts, published by Dutch Missionary Press in 1899.
- Achttien Jaren onder de Bataks ("Eighteen Years Among the Bataks"): A detailed, rare colonial memoir reflects his 18-year tenure (1857–1875) living, teaching, and pioneering schools in Sipirok and the surrounding regions. Published by D.A. Daamen in Rotterdam in 1905.
