= Henry Van Asselt =

Henry van Asselt
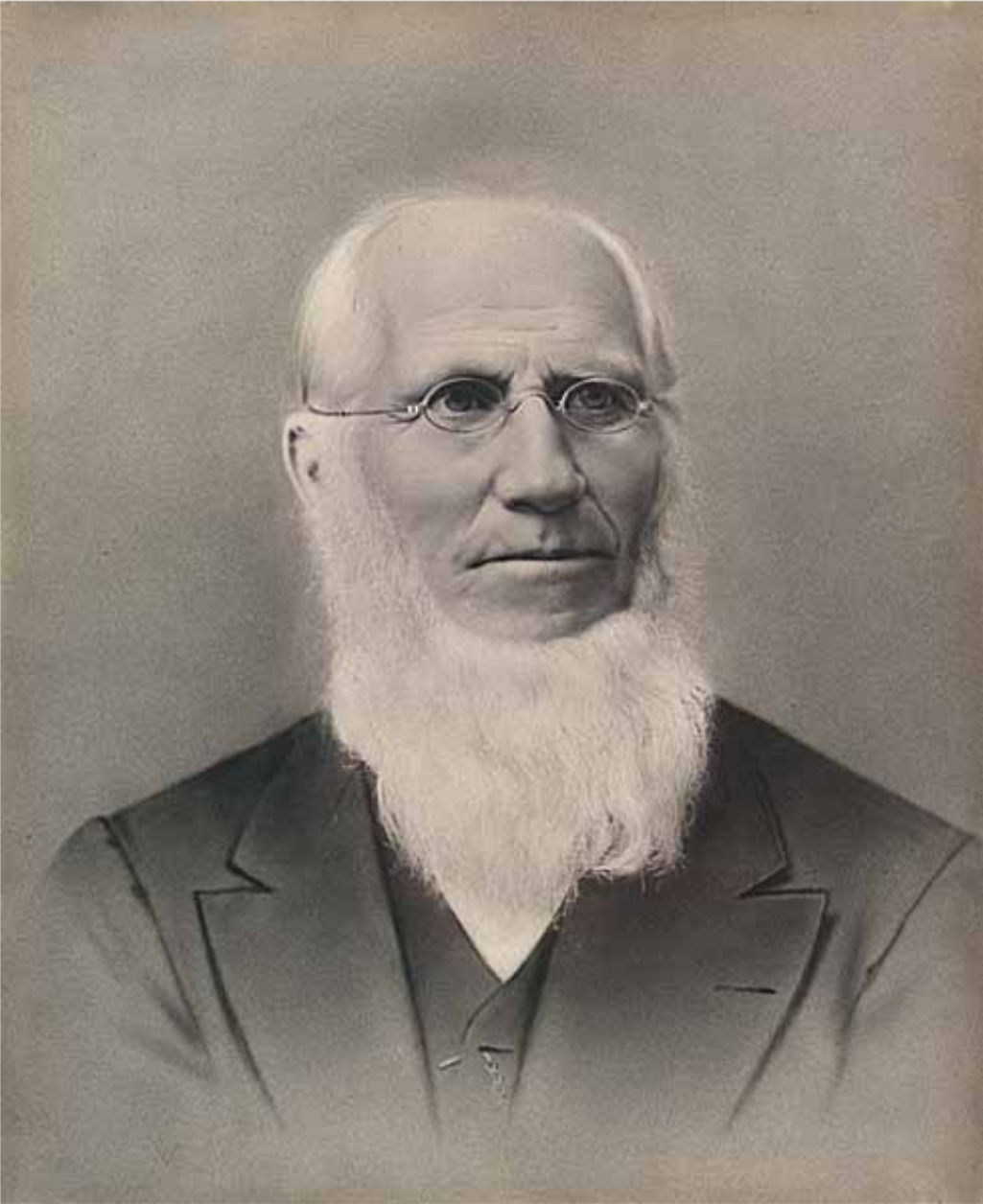
- Henry van Asselt, circa 1902 (coll. Museum of History & Industry)
- Born: 11 April 1817; Elspeet, Netherlands
- Died: 7 December 1902 (aged 85); Seattle, United States
- Occupations: Military Personnel; Farmer; Carpenter & Furniture Maker
- Spouse: Catherine Elizabeth Jane Maple (m. 1862–1902)
- Children: Mary Adrian, Jacob Helmert, Harriet Jane, and Nettie Ellenette
- Parents: Helmert Hendriksen van Asselt (father); Ariana Dirks Drost (mother)
- Relatives: Dirk van Asselt (1819–1820); Dirk van Asselt (1821–1910); Geertje van Asselt (1823–1904); Jannetje van Asselt (1825–1867); Jan van Asselt (1826–1897); Hendrik van Asselt (1828–1830); Hendrikje van Asselt (1830–1851); Gerrit van Asselt (1832–1910); Helmert van Asselt (1834–1916); Arien van Asselt (1836–1854); Nn. van Asselt (1836–1836)

Henry van Asselt (11 April 1817, Elspeet - 7 December 1902, Seattle) was a Dutch immigrant to the US, one of the first Europeans to settle the area that is now Seattle, Washington. He came to the area in 1847 and was the longest surviving original white settler of King County, Washington, dying at age 85. He married late in life, in December, 1862, to Jane, the daughter of Jacob Maples, and they had four children.

== Biography ==
=== Early life ===
He was born Hendrik van Asselt as the eldest child of Helmert van Asselt and Adriana Drost. At the age of 19, Van Asselt was drafted into the army, joining the Dutch Second Battalion of Yagers, and was stationed on the frontier between The Netherlands and Belgium. He served a little over three years, until peace was consummated between the two countries. He then hunted on local noble estates and farmed with his parents up to 1847.

His younger brother, Gerrit van Asselt (1932–1910), was one of the pioneer missionaries in Sumatra, Dutch East Indies (present-day: Indonesia), who was work for the Rhenish Missionary Society.

=== The Journey West ===
He sailed for America on the bark Suelhyd, from Amsterdam, and after a passage of forty-nine days landed in New York, on July 17, 1847. He went to New Jersey and worked nine months for $35, then proceeded from Albany, New York by canal to Buffalo, New York, and thence by lakes and river to St. Louis, Missouri where he worked five months; then to Bloomington, Iowa, where he remained until the spring of 1850, when he joined a party of eight, including James Thornton and Charles Hendricks, to cross the plains to California, paying $100 for his food and transportation.

At the fork of California and Oregon roads, they decided to go to Oregon, and arrived at Oregon City on September 21. Near Oregon City he hired on with a farmer for two months at $75 per month, then began a new job making shingles, which he did until February, 1851, when he joined with Thornton, Hendricks and others and went to the gold mines of northern California.

They spent about five and a half weeks mining when the water gave out, so they divided their gold, giving each of them about $1,000. But supplies were costly, with flour selling at $1 per pound, and bacon $1.25, so he decided to return to the Willamette Valley. On the way the party of five fell in with L. M. Collins, who had a claim on the Nisqually River, Washington Territory, and was traveling with Jacob and Samuel Maple. Collins convinced Van Asselt, Thornton, and Hendricks to join them. They spent July 4, 1851, at Oregon City, then proceeded, by the Tualatin Plains, to St. Helens.

While crossing the river from that point Mr. Van Asselt accidentally shot himself in the shoulder and returned to St. Helens for treatment, where he remained for thirty days, then joined his friends on the Nisqually.

=== Settlement ===
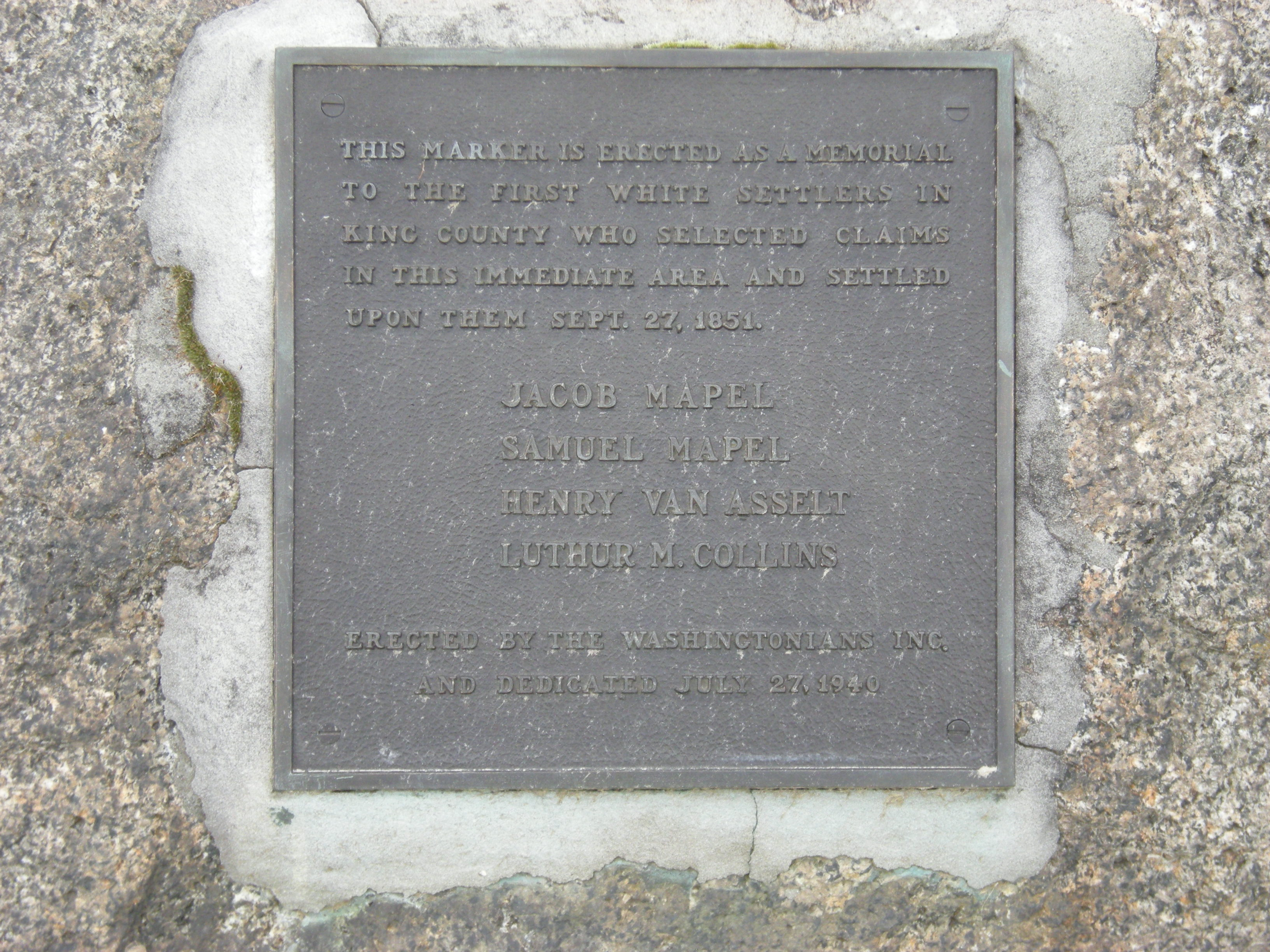
Henry Van Asselt's name on a Boeing Field plaque

While staying with Collins he explored the surrounding country for a place to settle, but did not find anything satisfactory, so he decided to return to the Willamette Valley with his friends. Collins convinced him to look for farmland forty miles down the Sound, where the Indians were still numerous. Van Asselt and Samuel and Jacob Maples agreed to go with him, and on September 12, 1851, they started their journey by canoe to the Duwamish River, then traveling upstream until they reached the junction of the White and Black rivers, where they found land and staked out claims. Van Asselt's claim is now part of Boeing Field. The site now occupied by Seattle was inhabited solely by Indians, and there were no settlers within the boundaries of what is now King County.

Returning to the Nisqually, Collins sold his claim there, and with a scow purchased at Olympia, Washington the combined party moved their animals and effects to the new claims, where they built log cabins, becoming the first settlers in the Seattle area. They were soon followed by the settlement of the Dennys and Terrys at Alki Point, and later by Mr. Yesler, who erected a sawmill, which provided work for the settlers in logging, as well as in farming. They began supplying squared timber for the San Francisco market.

During the first session of federal court, which was held in Henry Yesler's log cookhouse on Feb. 13, 1854, Van Asselt was granted U.S. citizenship.

The Indians were curious about Van Asselt, as he still used a sling on the arm that was injured. Finding that he still carried lead in his shoulder from the bullet wound, they considered him protected from a shooting death. He was a good hunter and accurate with his shotgun, and the combination of these circumstances made the Indians superstitious about him, so they nicknamed him "Sucway" - devil, and avoided direct confrontation with him, which served him well during the ensuing Indian troubles.

In September, 1855, the Indian war broke out on White River, and after the killing of several settlers, those remaining fled to safety in Seattle. Confrontations continued in the area for two years. Van Asselt joined Company A of the First Regiment, Washington Territory Volunteers, which was formed in Seattle to fight the Indians. When the aggression settled down and Van Asselt returned to his farm in 1857 he found all buildings and fences destroyed. He went to the Willamette Valley to work for several months to earn money in order to rebuild.

In 1860, Van Asselt donated land on which he and his neighbors built a schoolhouse, the first in King County. It has been succeeded by the Van Asselt Elementary School which was built nearby in 1950. A playground is also named after him.

In 1862, he married a neighbor's daughter, Jane Maple, in a ceremony which was attended by the local Indians, who were curious. They paraded through the cabin to see the new bride and groom. The Van Asselts had five children: Mary, Jacob, Harriet Jane, Ellen, and Nettie.

In 1883 Van Asselt moved to Hood River, Oregon, and farmed for six years, then moved to Seattle and established a cabinetmaker's shop. The Henry van Asselt residence in Seattle was built in 1890. It is no longer standing.
