= Beate Kuhn =

German ceramicist and sculptor (1927–2015)

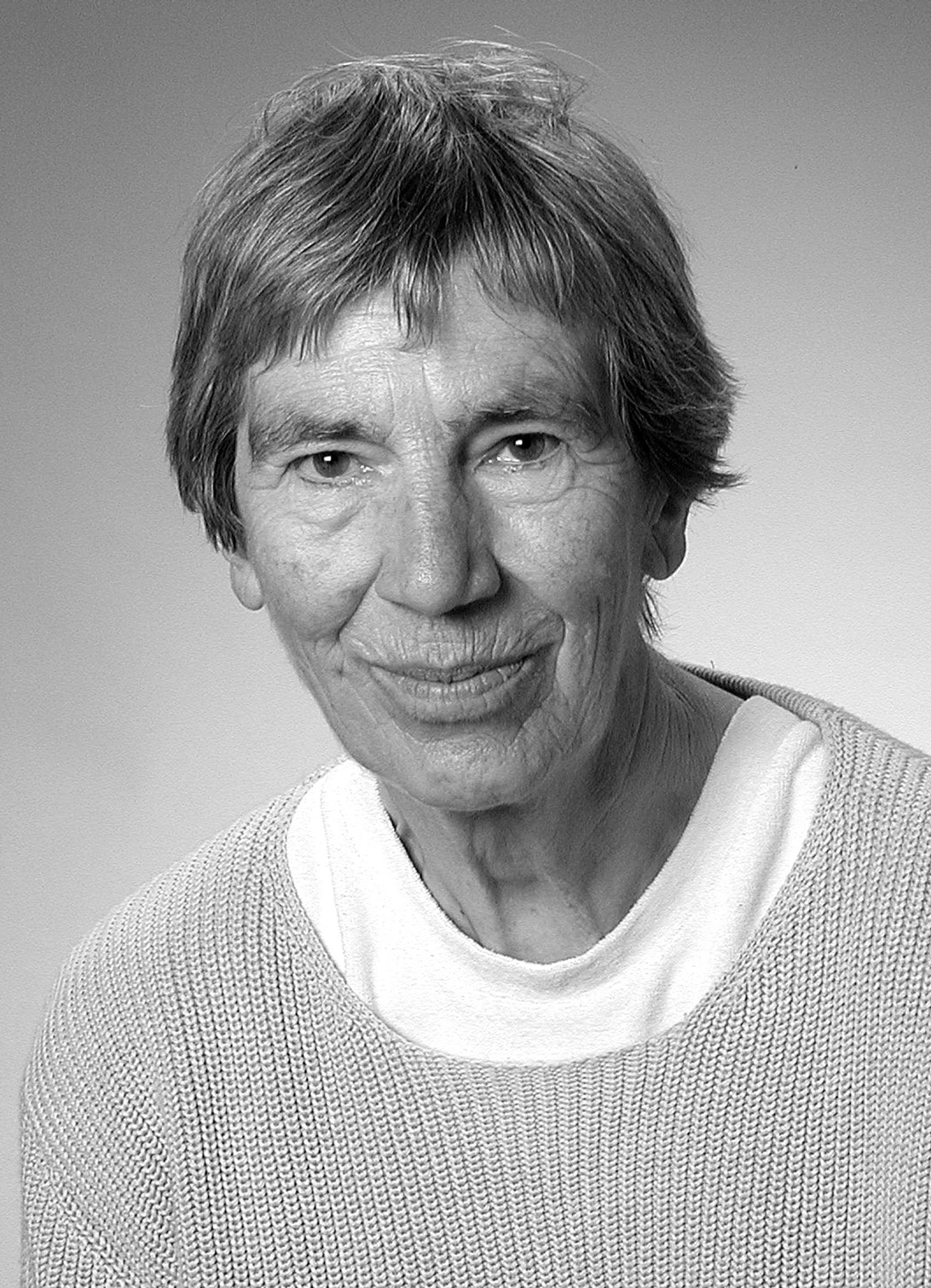
- Beate Kuhn, 2004
- Born: 15 July 1927; Düsseldorf, Germany
- Died: 10 December 2015 (aged 88)
- Education: Werkkunstschule Wiesbaden; Werkkunstschule Darmstadt
- Known for: Ceramics, ceramic sculpture
- Movement: Studio pottery
- Awards: Bavarian State Prize (1965); Hessian State Prize (1966)

Beate Kuhn (15 July 1927 – 10 December 2015) was a German ceramicist and sculptor. She is regarded as one of the most important figures in post-war studio pottery, developing an abstract sculptural style that combined the traditions of ceramics with the formal concerns of painting and sculpture. Her works, often inspired by nature and contemporary music, are represented in major collections including the Victoria and Albert Museum in London, the National Museum of Modern Art, Tokyo, and the Carnegie Museum of Art in Pittsburgh.

== Early life and education ==
Kuhn was born in Düsseldorf, the daughter of the sculptor Erich Kuhn and the pianist Lisa Kuhn. During the Second World War the family was displaced and moved to Hinterzarten in the Black Forest. She completed her secondary education in Neustadt in 1946 and initially studied art history at the University of Freiburg.

In 1949 she enrolled at the Werkkunstschule in Wiesbaden, where she studied ceramics with Erika Opitz and Hans Karl Starke, completing her apprenticeship in 1951. She continued her training at the Werkkunstschule in Darmstadt under Friedrich Theodor Schroeder, where she refined her skills in wheel-throwing and design.

== Career ==
In 1953 Kuhn established a workshop in Lottstetten with the ceramicist Karl Scheid, producing functional pottery as well as designs for the porcelain manufacturer Rosenthal. In 1956 the workshop relocated to Düdelsheim, today part of Büdingen, and later included Ursula Scheid and the wood sculptor Bernhard Vogler.

Although she began with utilitarian vessels, by the late 1950s Kuhn was experimenting with ceramics as a medium for abstraction. She initially decorated pots with figurative and geometric motifs, but soon moved towards sculptural assemblages built from thrown components such as cylinders, cones, discs and spheres. Her works suggested organic processes of growth and rhythm, and critics often compared them to musical compositions, reflecting her engagement with contemporary composers such as Giacinto Scelsi, Luigi Nono and Luciano Berio.

From the 1960s onwards Kuhn developed a distinctive sculptural vocabulary that combined humour, playfulness and a deep engagement with natural form. She created both small-scale pieces and monumental fountains and reliefs. Major exhibitions of her work were held at the Keramion in Frechen, the Grassi Museum of Applied Arts in Leipzig, and the Pinakothek der Moderne in Munich, which dedicated a retrospective to her ceramics in 2017.

She was elected to the Académie Internationale de la Céramique in 1968 and in 1983 became a founding member of the German ceramicists’ association Gruppe 83.

== Personal life and death ==
Kuhn lived and worked in Düdelsheim for most of her life, maintaining close ties with her collaborators and the community of ceramicists around the Scheid family. She continued to experiment with form and technique well into her eighties, incorporating new materials and glazes.

She died on 10 December 2015 at the age of 88.
