= Roelof Bisschop =

Dutch historian and politician

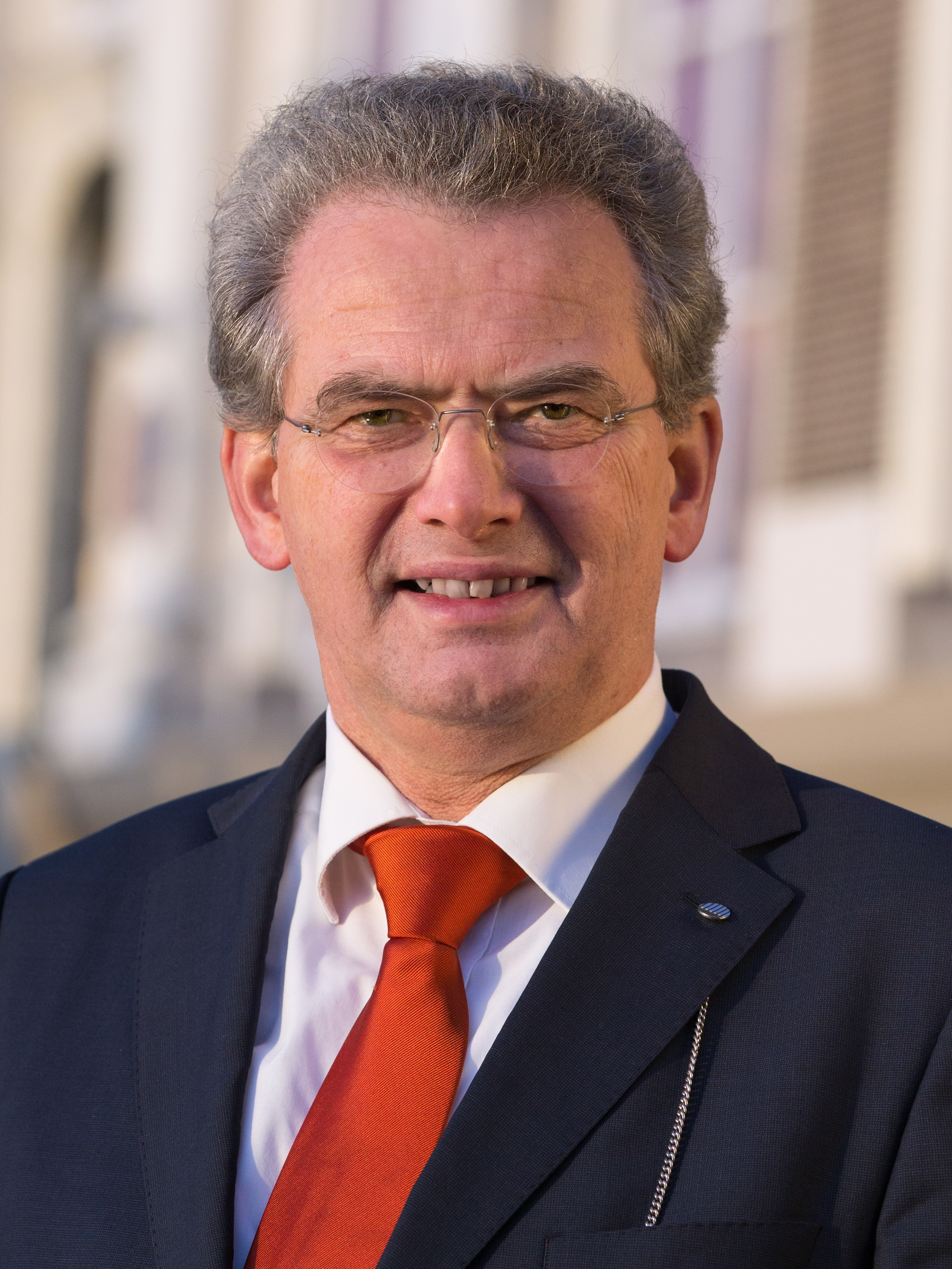
- Roelof Bisschop (2016)

Member of the House of Representatives
- In office 20 September 2012 – 5 December 2023

Personal details
- Born: 30 November 1956 (age 69) Staphorst
- Party: Reformed Political Party
- Occupation: Politician

Roelof Bisschop (born 30 November 1956 in Staphorst) is a Dutch historian and politician. As a member of the Reformed Political Party (SGP) he has been an MP since 20 September 2012. Previously he was a member of the municipal council of Veenendaal from 1986 to 2007 and a member of the States-Provincial of Utrecht from 2003 to 2011.

Roelof Bisschop is a member of the Restored Reformed Church.

== Electoral history ==
Electoral history of Roelof Bisschop
| Year | Body | Party | Pos. | Votes | Result | | Ref. |
| Year | Body | Party | Pos. | Votes | Party seats | Individual | Ref. |
|---|---|---|---|---|---|---|---|
| 2024 | European Parliament | Reformed Political Party | 38 (Note: Bisschop participated as a lijstduwer.) | 667 | 1 | Lost | |
