= Restored Reformed Church =

Calvinist denomination in the Netherlands

- Classification: Protestant
- Orientation: Calvinist
- Polity: Presbyterian
- Origin: 1 May 2004; Netherlands
- Separated from: Dutch Reformed Church
- Congregations: 118 (2013)
- Members: 60,159 (2021)
- Ministers: 60 + 25 (retired) + 20 (students, assistant ministers) (2010)
- Missionaries: 1 (2010)

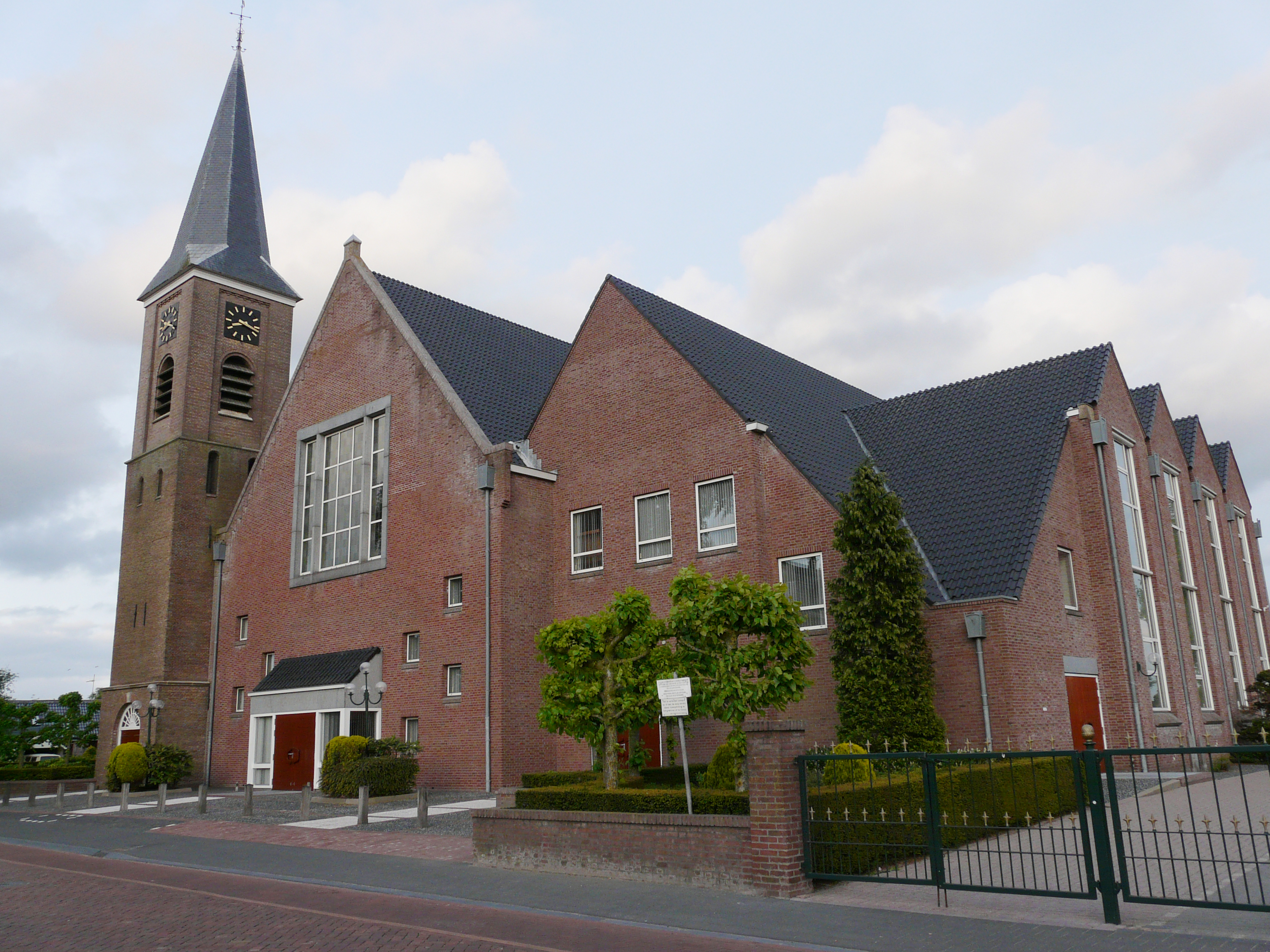
HHK Staphorst (2300 seats)

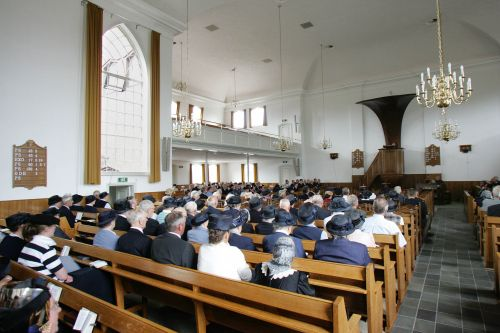
Headcovering in the Restored Reformed Church of Doornspijk

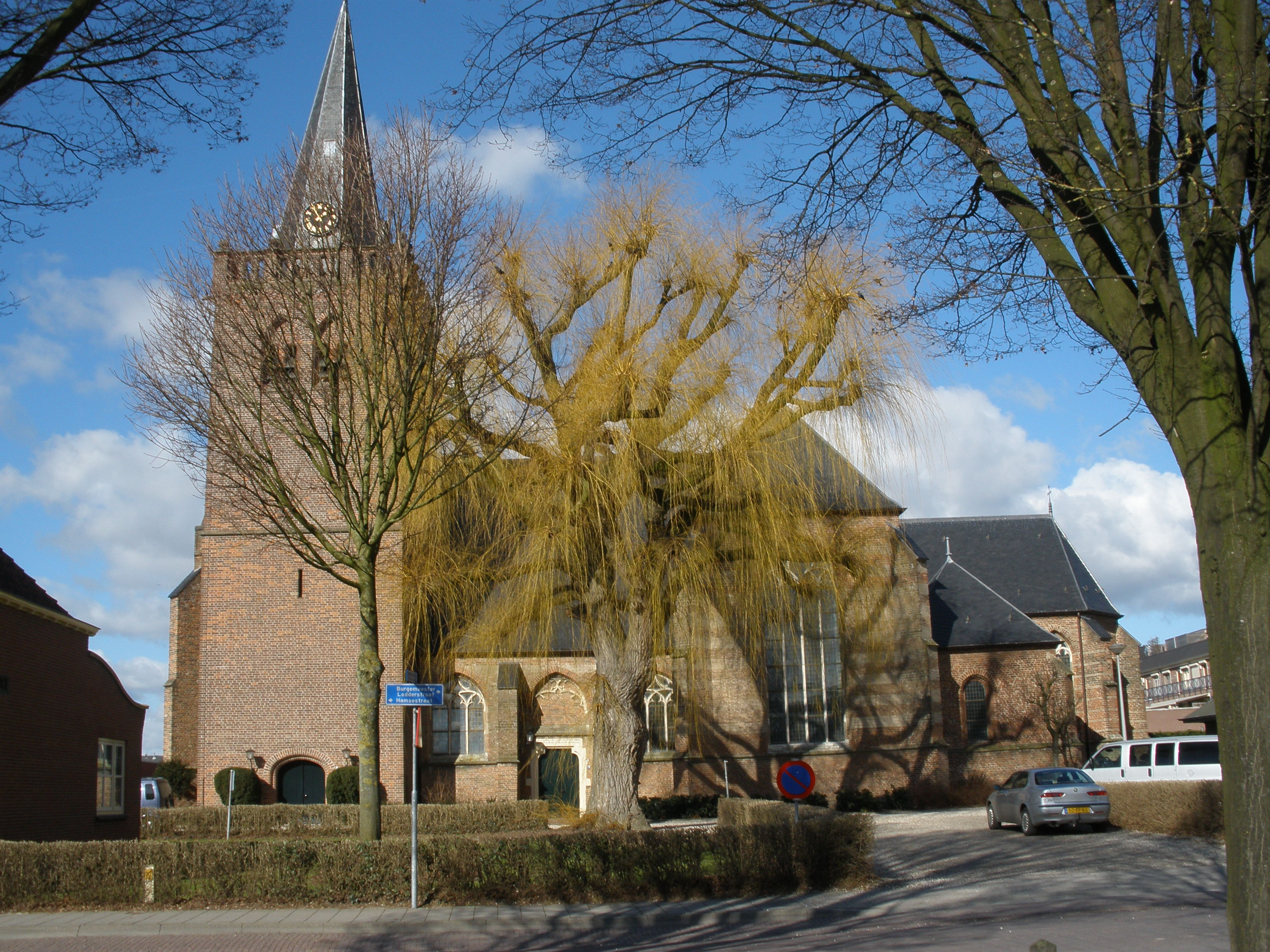
Opheusden Restored Reformed Congregation

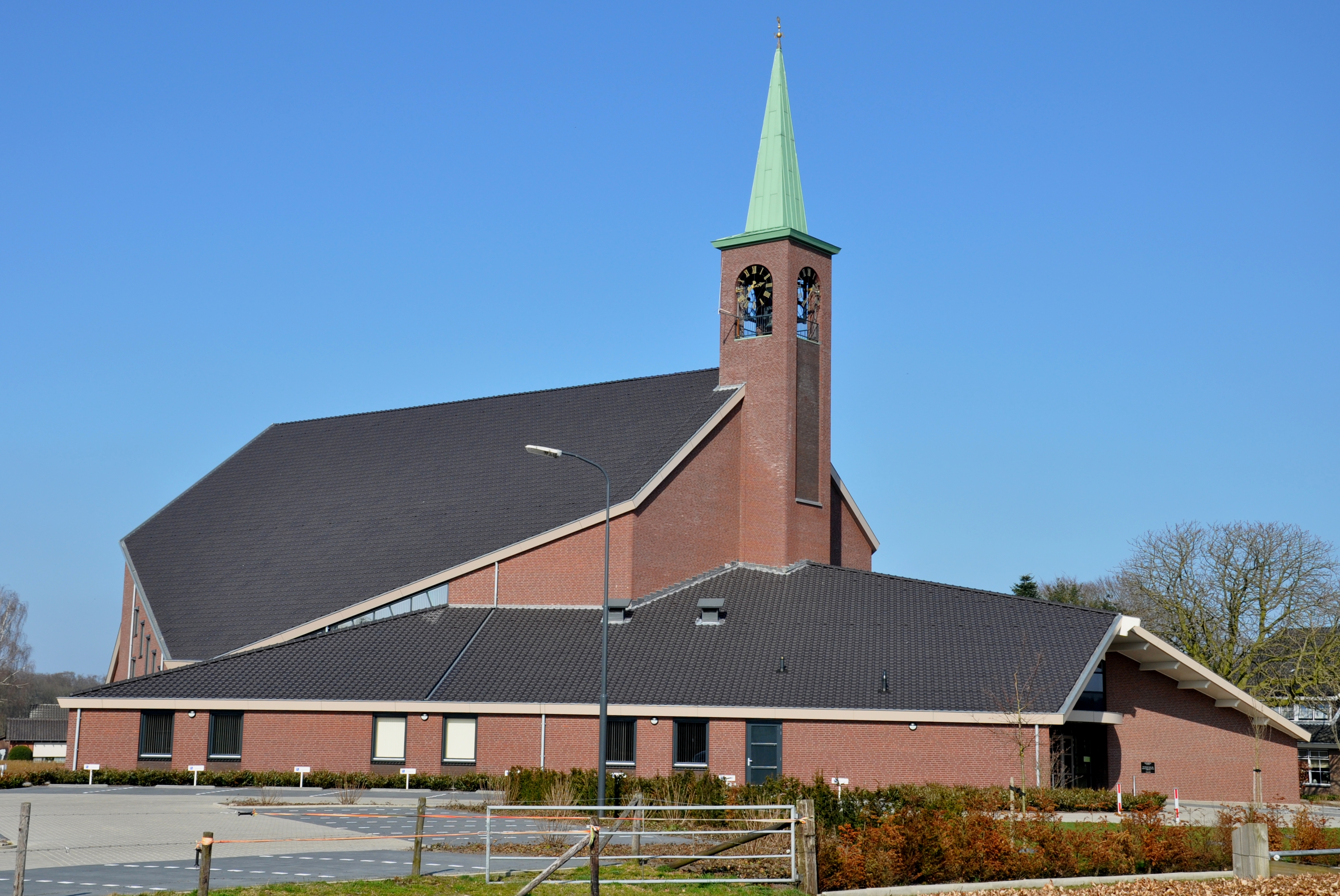
Elspeet Restored Reformed Church

The Restored Reformed Church (Dutch: Hersteld Hervormde Kerk, abbreviated HHK) is a Calvinist denomination in the Netherlands. It was founded in 2004, from congregations which made up the orthodox-reformed wing of the Dutch Reformed Church; they had previously been part of groups named Het Gekrookte Riet ("The Bruised Reed") and the still existing Gereformeerde Bond ("Reformed Association") within the Dutch Reformed Church. The Church has grown steadily since its founding.

== History ==
The Restored Reformed Church was founded on 1 May 2004, by a minority of the Calvinist Bond inside the Dutch Reformed Church (Nederlandse Hervormde Kerk) who opposed that church's merger with two other Protestant churches into the Protestant Church in the Netherlands (Protestantse Kerk in Nederland). The first president of the denomination was Dirk Heemskerk. Later several free churches joined this new federation in Rotterdam, Alblasserdam, Schiedam, Waddinxveen and an Old Reformed Church voted to affiliate with Restored Reformed Church. Many congregations have their own church buildings, but several churches meet in storehouses and schools. In the towns of Elspeet, Sommelsdijk, Sint-Annaland, Putten, Terschuur, Barneveld Restored Reformed congregations have new buildings and others are preparing for this. In 2014, the Church had a membership of 58,821 in 118 congregations. The church established the Reformed Seminary which in 2011 had seventy students; the rector is Wim van Vlastuin.

== Character, statistics ==
The Restored Reformed Church is a Calvinist church of presbyterian polity. It cooperates with the Christian Reformed Church in the Netherlands in youth programmes. There is also a possibility to exchange ministers. Officially the denomination use only the Statenvertaling translation of the Bible. Almost all the congregations are in the Dutch Bible Belt. Staphorst, Ouddorp, Lunteren, Katwijk, Urk, Elspeet, Doornspijk and Opheusden are towns where large Restored Reformed churches can be found. The church has seven presbyteries (Dutch: Classis): Classis North, Classis North Veluwe, Classis Center, Classis East, Classis South East, Classis West, and Classis Southwest. These classes form the General Synod.

== Theology ==
=== Creeds ===
- Apostles Creed
- Athanasian Creed
- Nicene Creed

=== Confessions ===
- Heidelberg Catechism
- Belgic Confession
- Canons of Dort

== Missions ==
It conducts missionary work in Malawi, where the Dutch minister Rev. R.J. Oomen works in the Reformed Presbyterian Church of Malawi (RPC). The church consists of 170 congregations in Malawi, mainly in the central and southern part of Malawi. The church there has about 15,000 members. The work is to advise the governing bodies of the church and to teach the leaders and students. There is a mission point in Suriname in Paramaribo and in the village of Klein Powakka among the Arowak Indians. On 14 August 2012 a Canadian congregation was added to the Restored Church, the Springford Reformed Church.

The largest congregations are those of Staphorst and Ouddorp.

== Membership ==
In 2004/2005 the Restored Reformed Church had 53,900 members. In 2014, there were 58,821 members in the Netherlands and in Ontario, Canada. In 2021, the church had 60,159 members.

== Notable members ==
- Roelof Bisschop, politician (member of the lower house of the Dutch Parliament)
- Bart Jan Spruyt, historian, journalist and conservative writer
- Bas van der Vlies, former politician (member of the lower house of the Dutch Parliament)
- Wim van Vlastuin, theologian, minister and professor at the Vrije Universiteit Amsterdam
