= Erich Kuhn =

German sculptor

- Born: 31 July 1890; Berlin, Germany
- Died: 12 February 1967 (aged 76); Frankfurt, Germany
- Occupation: Sculptor
- Spouse: Lisa Kuhn-Zoll (m. 1826–1967)
- Children: Beate Kuhn

Erich Kuhn (31 July 1890 – 12 February 1967) was a German sculptor. His work was part of the sculpture event in the art competition at the 1936 Summer Olympics.

== Early life and education ==
Erich Kuhn was born on July 31, 1890, in Berlin, where he attended the Graues Kloster (Grey Friars) school. In 1911, he passed the state examination for secondary school teaching, thereby concluding the painting studies he had begun in 1908 on the advice of Max Liebermann and Lovis Corinth. He studied under Corinth for several months and prior to serving as an artilleryman in World War I from 1915 to 1918—was a master student of Professor Koepping in the Department of Copperplate Engraving and Etching.

== Career ==
After World War I, Kuhn turned to sculpture, teaching himself the craft during a stay on the Feldberg in the Black Forest that lasted until 1926. In 1924, he spent a year in Italy, visiting Florence where he focused on stone sculpture as well as Rome, Naples, and Sicily.

His time in Düsseldorf lasting from 1926 until his studio and home were destroyed in 1943, and during which he worked as an independent sculptor and head of the training workshops at the Academy of Arts was interrupted in 1932 by a nine-month journey to Sumatra (where he created the country's first major monument), Java, and Bali.

Before assuming leadership of the Department of Sculpture and Ceramics at the Werkkunstschule (School of Applied Arts) in Wiesbaden in 1949, Kuhn lived with his family in Hinterzarten in the Black Forest. His teaching career ended in 1956 upon his reaching the mandatory retirement age. Since then, Erich Kuhn has lived in Wiesbaden as an independent sculptor. Sculptures by Erich Kuhn, a member of the Neue Darmstädter Sezession have been featured in numerous major exhibitions in Germany and abroad (including Vienna, Milan, Florence, and Perugia); in 1937, he was awarded the Grand Prix and the Diplôme d'honneur in Paris. His large relief-decorated door made of Nirosta steel was exhibited at the World's Fair.

== Gallery ==
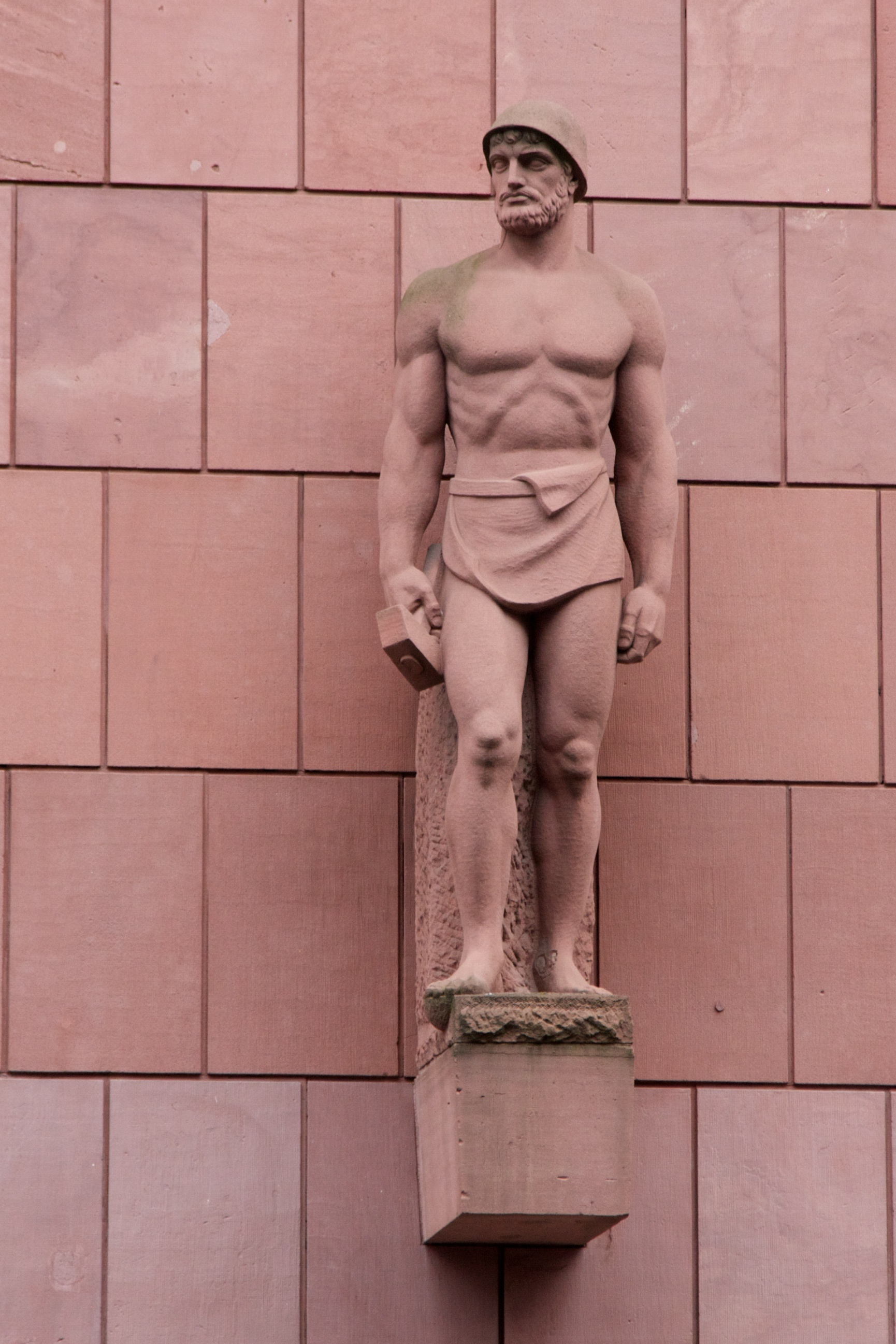
Sandstone sculpture by Erich Kuhn on the facade of the Walzstahlhaus building in Düsseldorf, Germany.

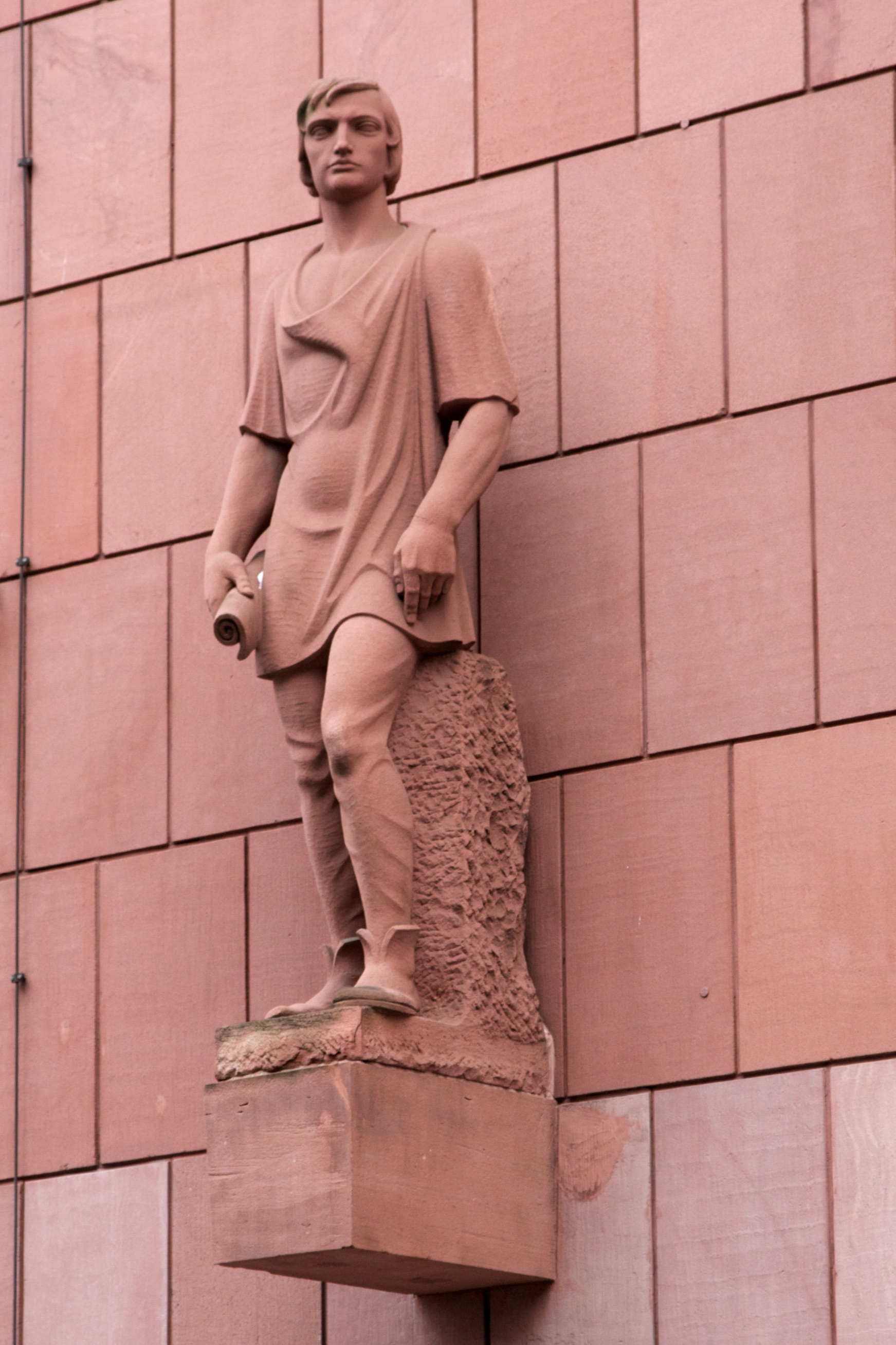
Sandstone sculpture by Erich Kuhn on the facade of the Walzstahlhaus building in Düsseldorf, Germany.
