= Solu =

Traditional boat of the Toba Batak people

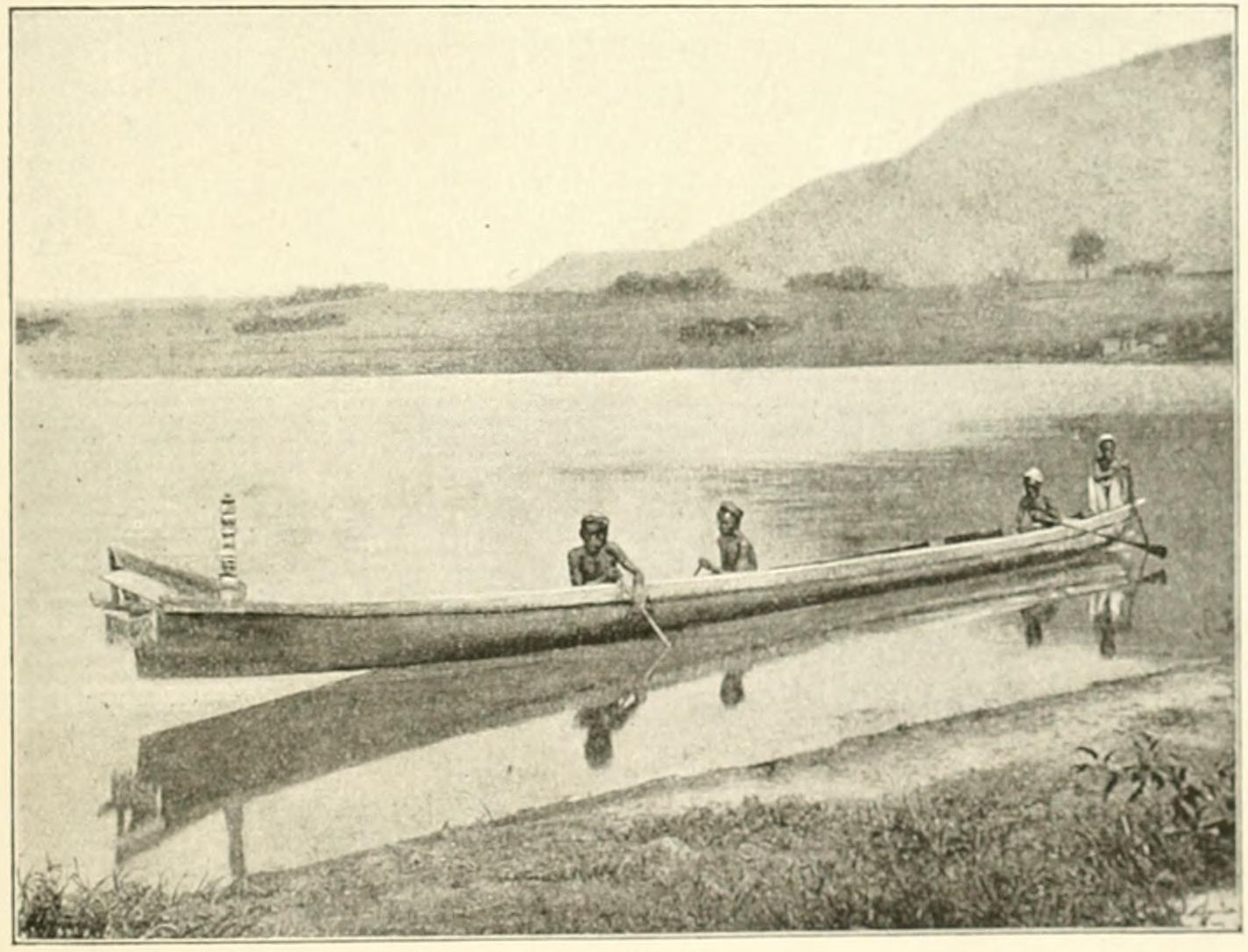
A solu on lake Toba.

A solu is a traditional boat of the Toba Batak people of North Sumatra, Indonesia. The solu is a dugout canoe, with boards added on the side bound with iron tacks. They are of various size, the largest, for 50 rowers, are about 18 meters in length; there is a slight keel carved fore and aft. They are propelled by sitting rowers, who sit in pairs on cross seats. The paddles used have an oval blade and cross handle. The boat can be distinguished by its ornaments: The stern ornament is called giarogia di pudi, which consists of three sticks with tufts of horsehair and a row of shorter sticks called rame rame with a bigger one in the middle distinctly phalloid, strung across; no tradition appears to explain this singular ornament. The ornament on the prow is a carved and painted figure symbolising a buffalo head, with another rame rame strung in front with its singular central phallus. A sort of bowsprit with tufts of horsehair at the sides and one of human hair at the end, over it rises an upright carved post, called the torgiok.

== Gallery ==
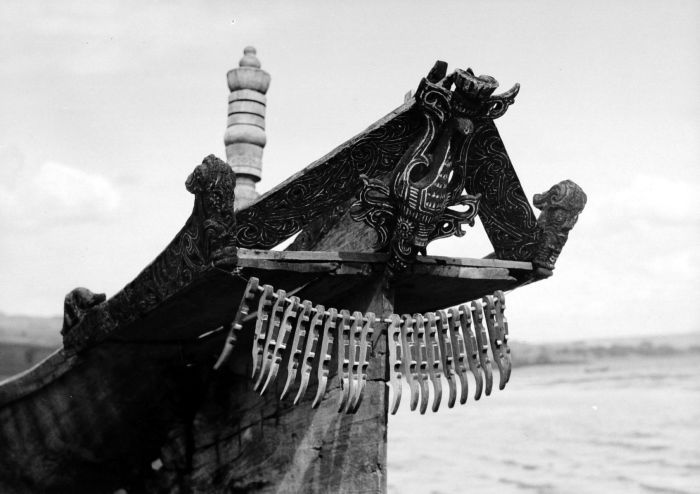
Carved prow decorations of a Toba Batak prahu.

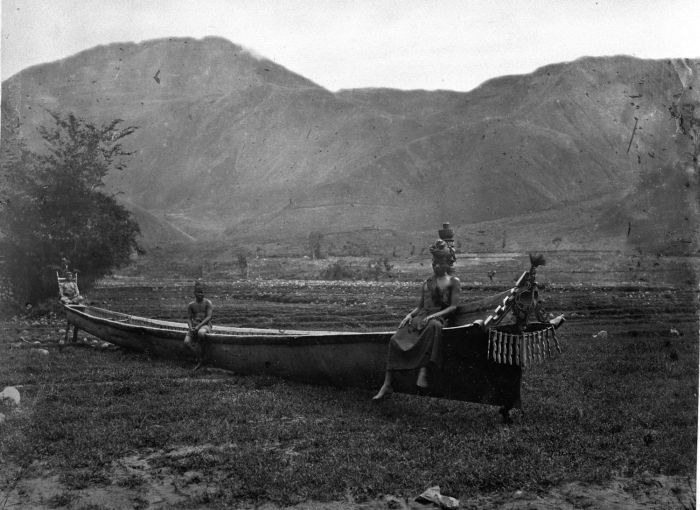
A beached solu.

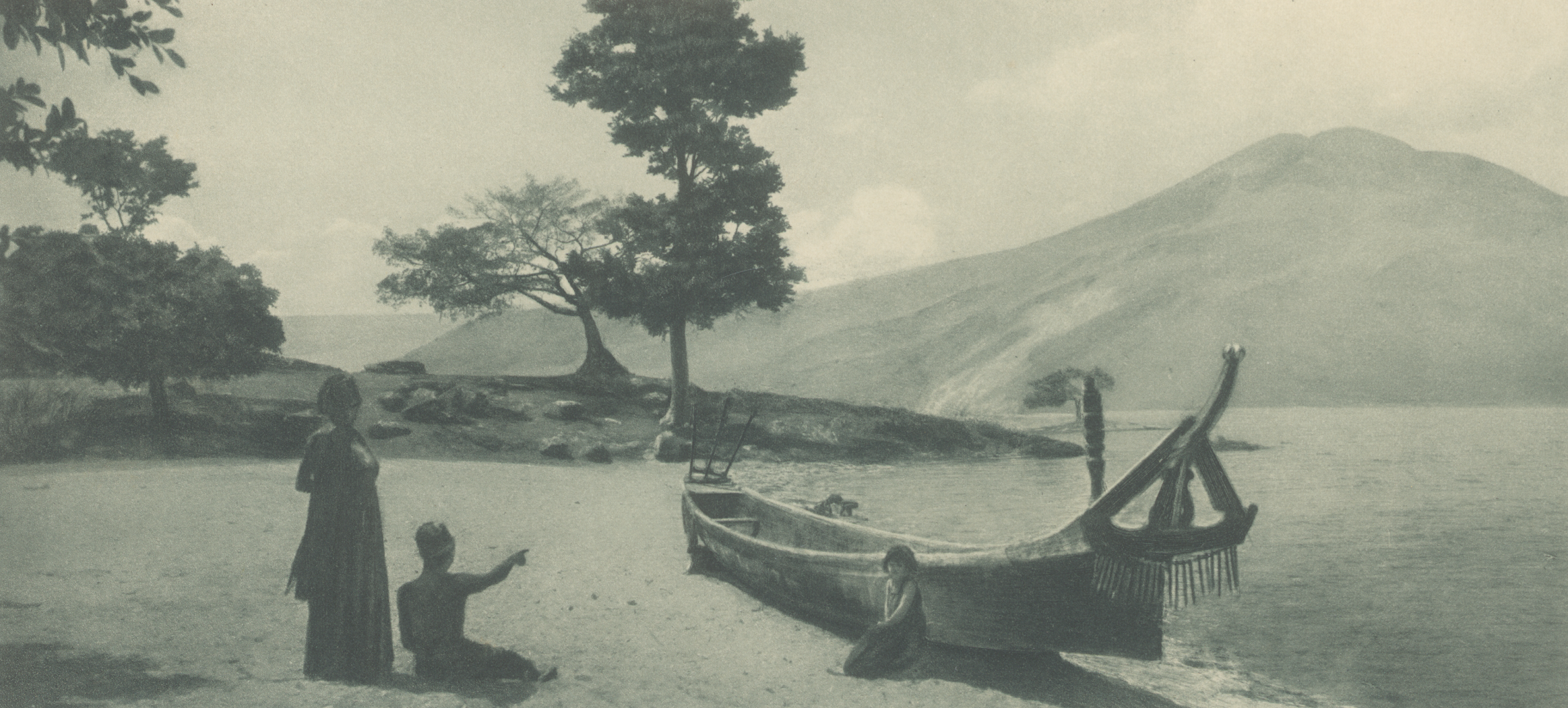
Solu on the beach at Lake Toba at Hutarajah on Samosir, in the background the Pusuk Buhit.

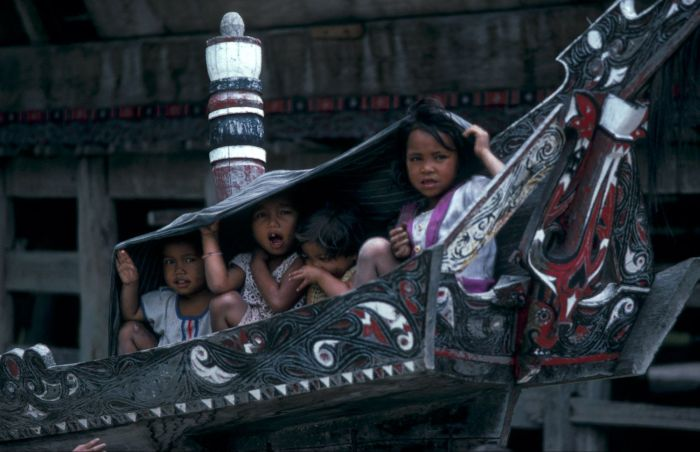
Toba Batak children in a solu at Simanindo.

== See also ==
- Kelulus
- Kalulis
- Londe
- Pelang
- Jongkong
