= Elspeet =

- Village
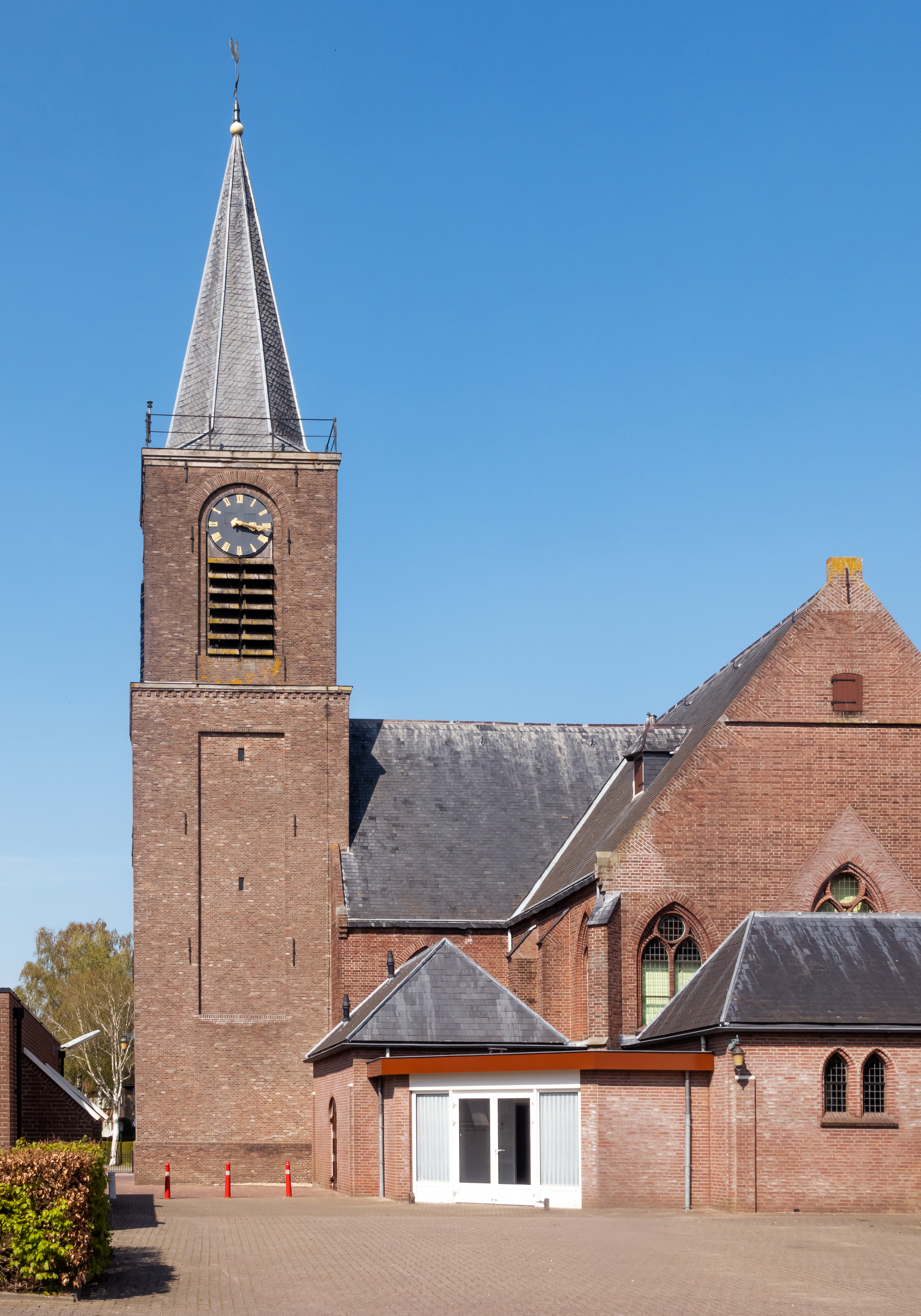
- Dutch Reformed Church

- Location in the province of Gelderland in the Netherlands Elspeet (Netherlands)
- Coordinates: 52°15′28″N 5°46′51″E
- Country: Netherlands
- Province: Gelderland
- Municipality: Nunspeet

Area
  - Total: 31.53 km^{2} (12.17 sq mi)
- Elevation: 30 m (98 ft)

Population (2021)
  - Total: 4,730
  - Density: 150/km^{2} (389/sq mi)
- Time zone: UTC+1 (CET)
  - Summer (DST): UTC+2 (CEST)
- Postal code: 8075
- Dialing code: 0577

Elspeet is a tourist village in the Netherlands, in the Veluwe region, in the municipality of Nunspeet, Gelderland, Netherlands. The village is situated about 10 kilometers south of Nunspeet and about 4 kilometers north of Uddel, on the Northern Veluwe. It is surrounded by forest and heather. The village has 4,635 inhabitants.

The origin of the name Elspeet is not entirely clear. El is thought to be referring to the word old and speet (spaded) to its older reclamation: ground first spaded over, as distinct from Nunspeet where this came later.

Elspeet is a conservative Protestant village. In the 2006 municipal elections, 70 percent of the local population voted for the Reformed Political Party (SGP). The three Christian parties in the elections (the Reformed Political Party, the Christian Union and the Christian Democratic Appeal) had a combined total of almost 90 percent of the votes.

== Gallery ==
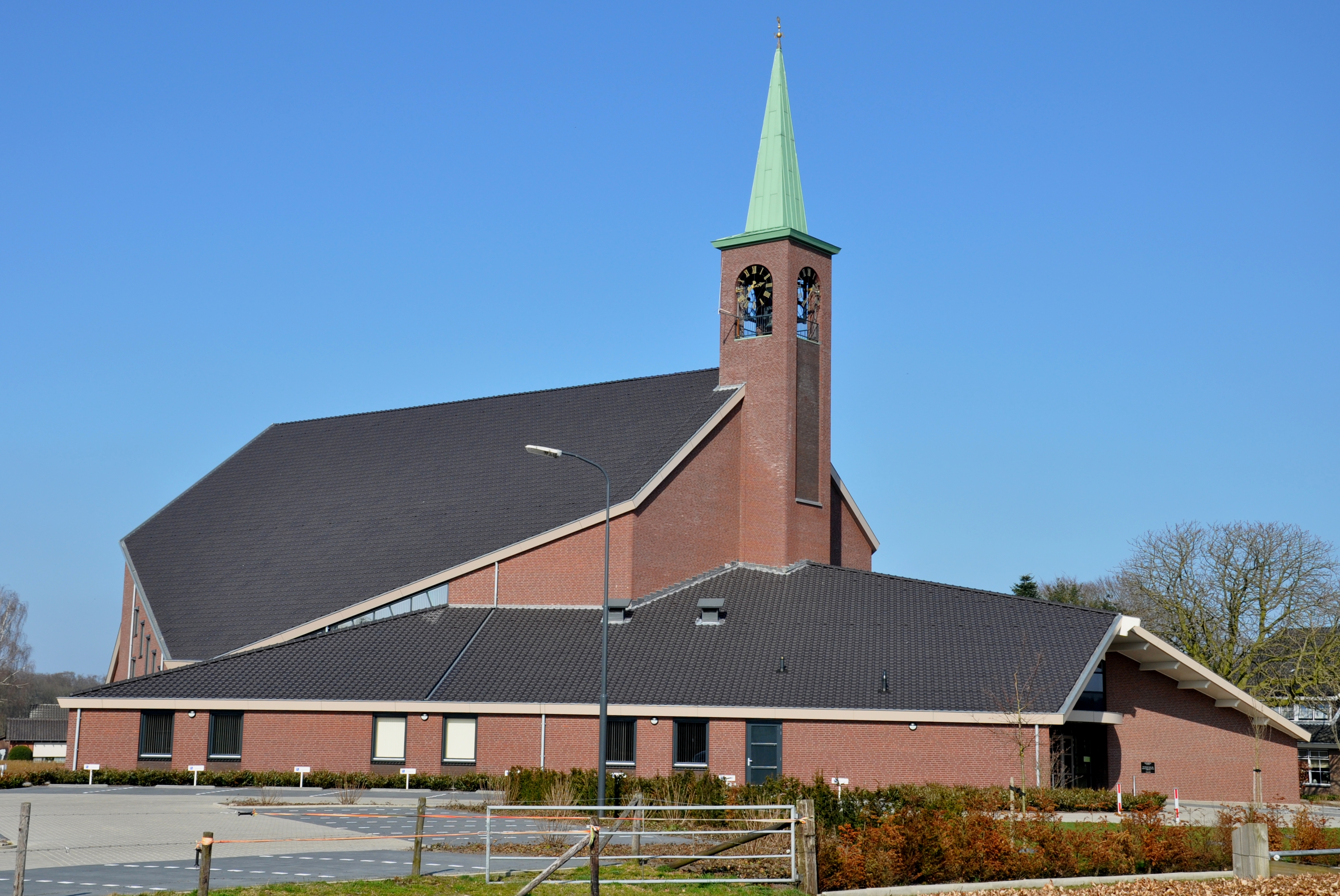
Restored Reformed Church

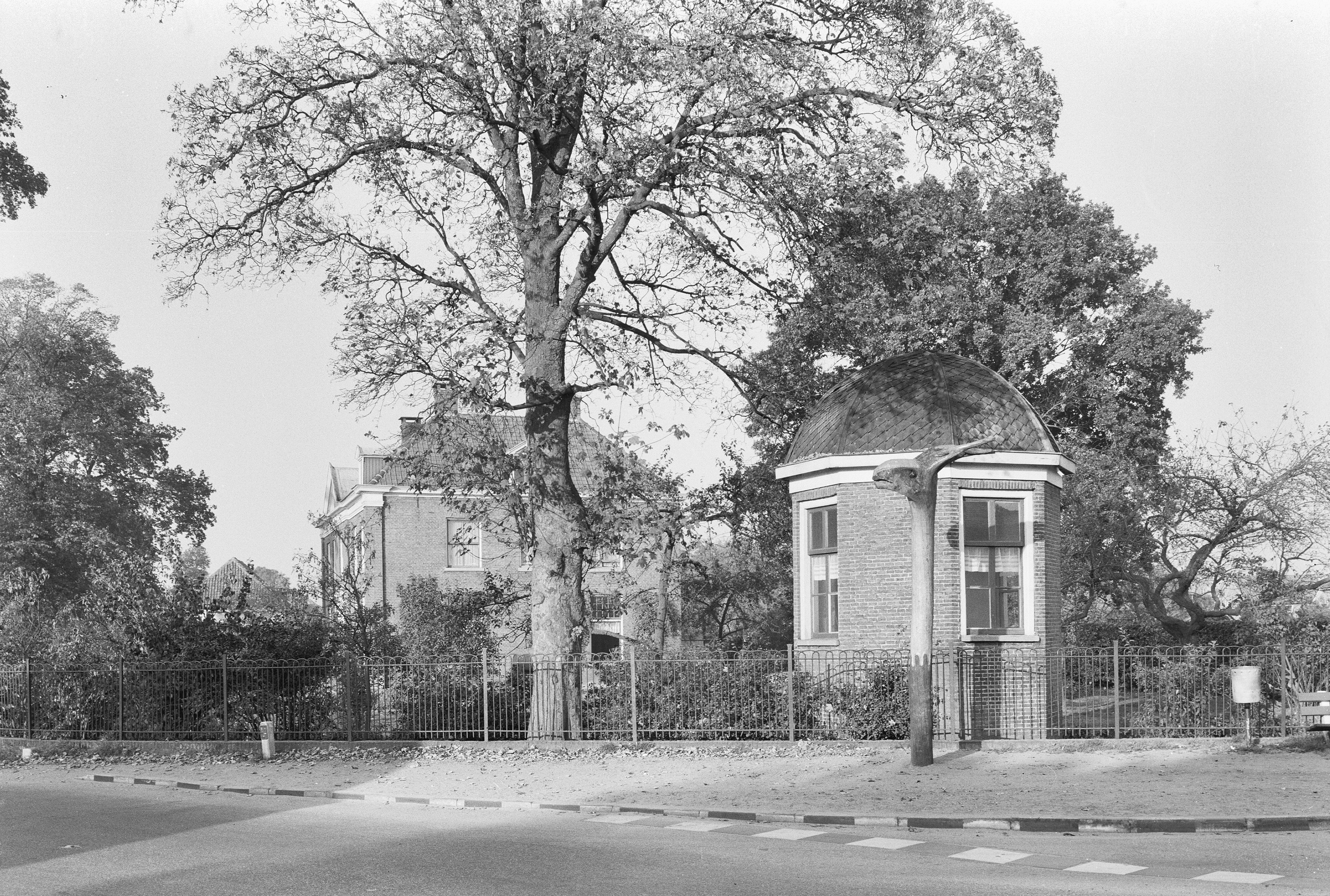
Tea house

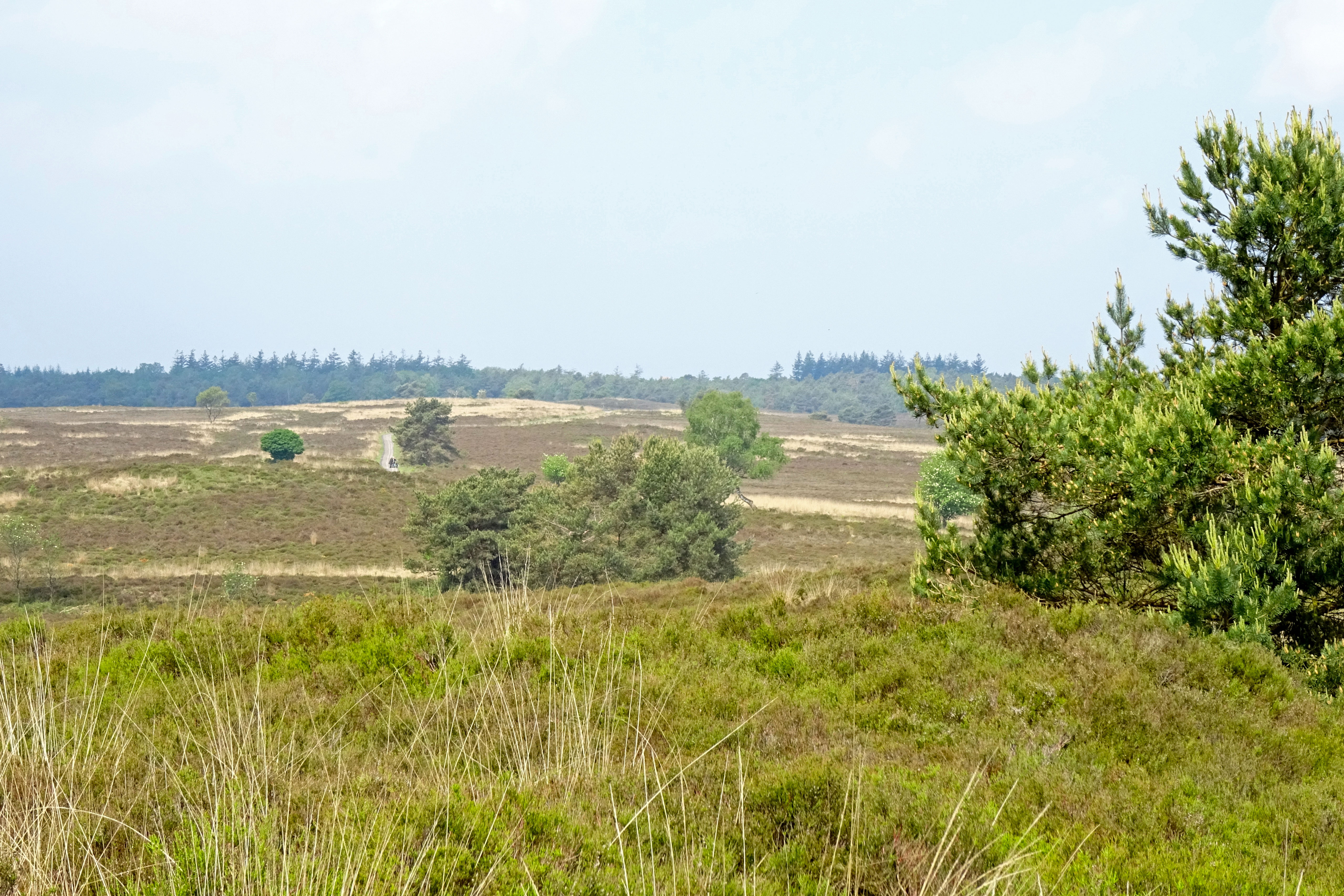
Heath near Elspeet

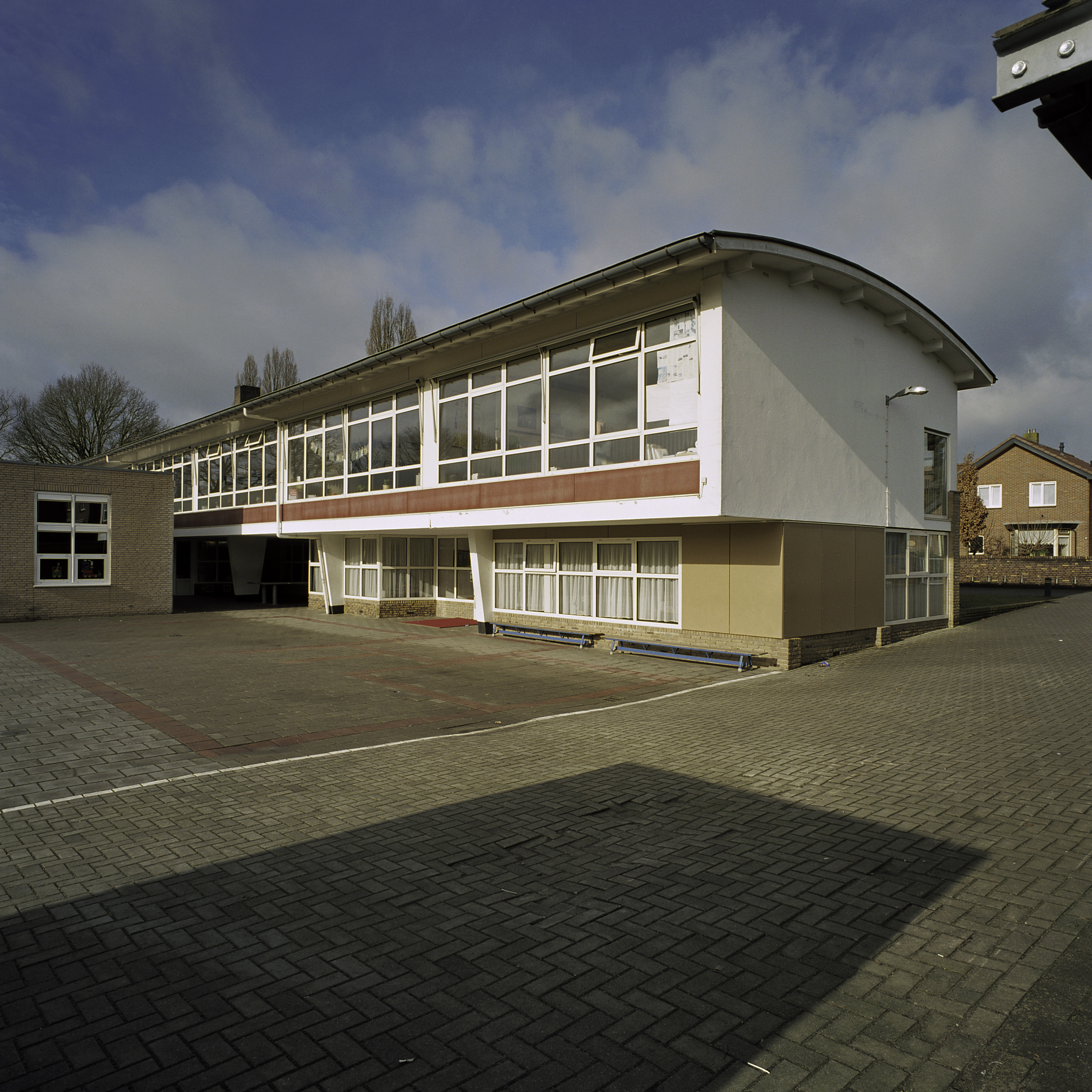
School in Elspeet
