= Gorga (art) =

Indonesian art form

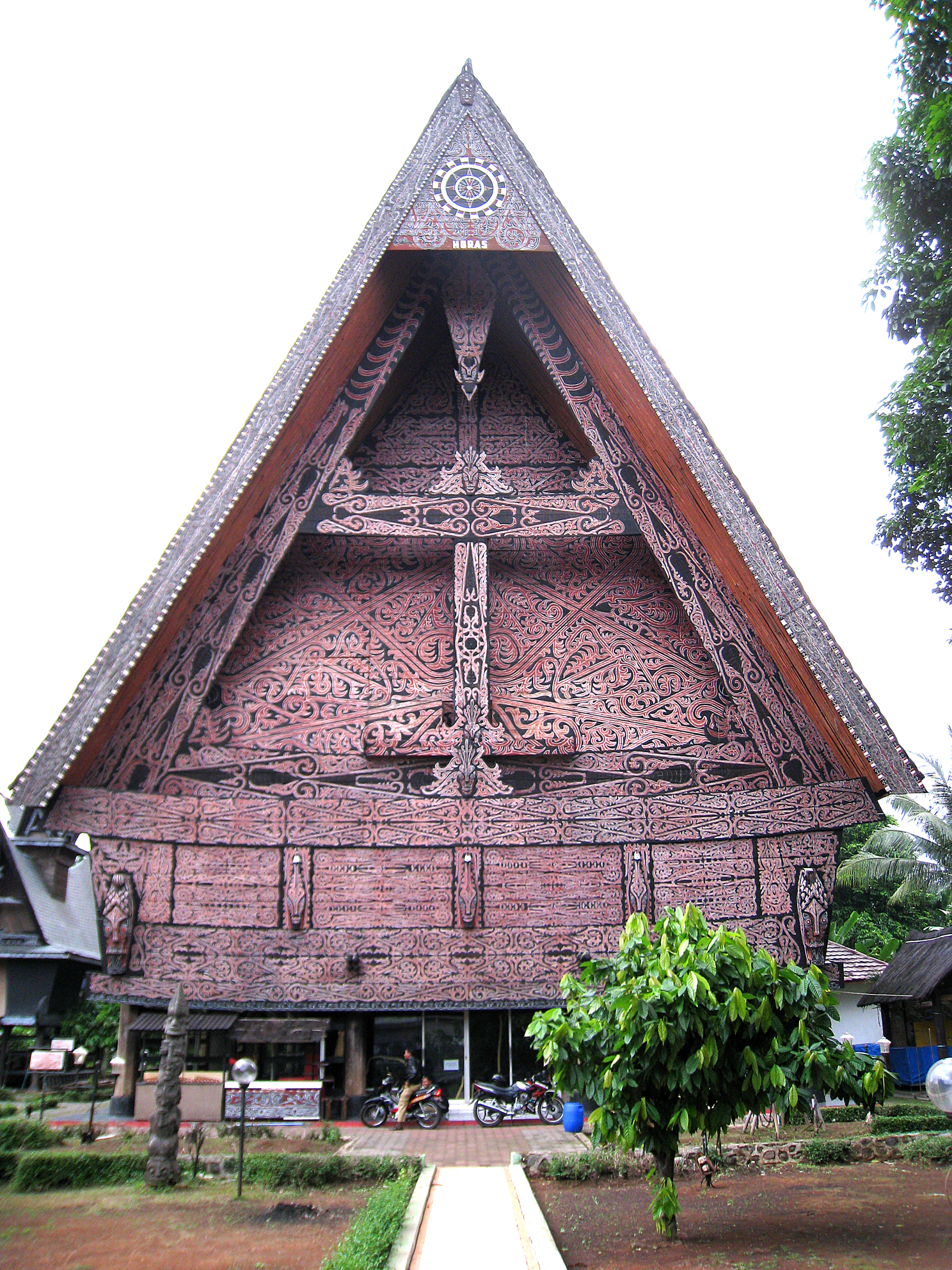
The arabesque-like red, white, and black gorga pattern decorates the facade of this Batak Toba house.

Gorga is a form of artistic decoration found in the culture of Batak Toba in North Sumatra, Indonesia. The gorga motif is in the shape of flourishes and undulations. The motif is either painted or carved onto wood using three colors: white, red, and black; each corresponds with different realms in the Batak Toba cosmology. The Gorga motif is often found in Batak Toba architecture, e.g. a Batak Toba house, or objects, e.g. music instruments. They are meant to protect the building or object from spiritual harm, e.g. evil spirits sent from neighboring village.

== Pattern and color ==
Gorga motif often decorates the surfaces of traditional houses and figural carvings. Gorga engravings are believed to protect the house against flood, earthquakes, and fire; and to repel the house against harm from the evil spirits. Gorga carving is made by outlining the floral or undulation motif onto the wood, and then the knife edge is placed at a cant, with the mallet tapping it along the line. To ensure a fine groove, a similar cut then is made with the knife and mallet canted in the opposite direction. Gorga painting can be found decorating the inside of Batak Toba houses, and not necessarily as carvings. Gorga uses the colors red, black, and white. The tri-color is known as sitiga bolit, each symbolizing the tri-realm in the Batak cosmology: the white symbolizes the upper realm (banua ginjang), red symbolizes the middle realm (banua tonga), while black symbolizes the lower realm (banua toru). Traditionally, the red color is taken from batu hula, a kind of red-colored stone. White is taken from soft stone known as tano buro. Black color is taken from plants.

== Architecture ==
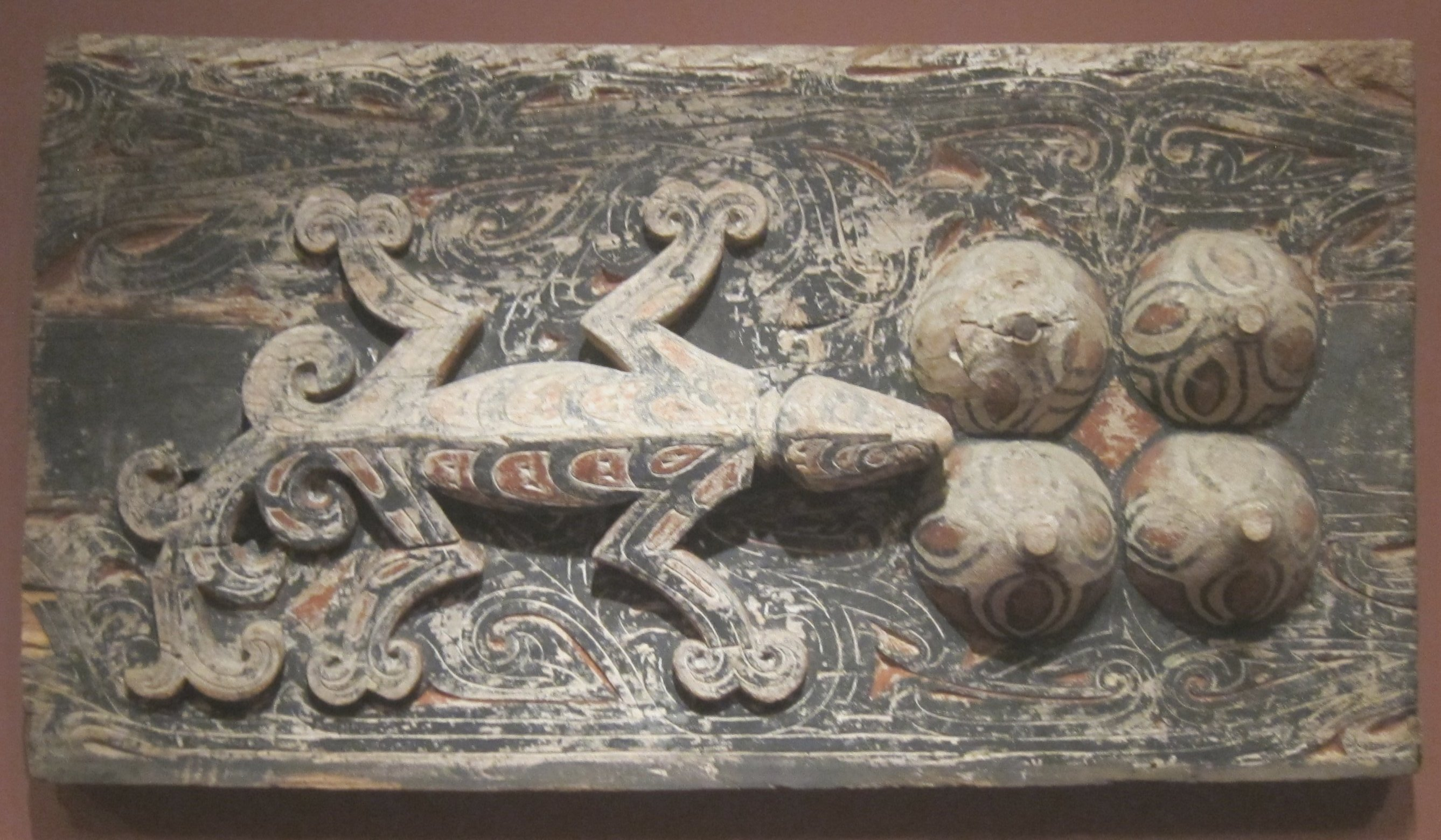
The combination of gorga boraspati (gecko) and gorga adop adop (breasts) symbolizes the fertility of the land.

In a Batak house, gorga motifs are carved or painted on specific areas of the house. Some examples are listed here: Gorga simataniari ("sun's gorga"), a gorga-depiction of the sun, is carved on the left and right corner of a house as a symbol of life. Gorga ulu singa ("singa's gorga") represents the spiritual being singa of Batak mythology is placed on top of the front gable of a Batak house. Gorga boraspati depicts the gecko god Boraspati ni Tano and is usually carved on the side plank of a Batak house or barn houses; gorga baraspati is usually paired with gorga adop adop ("breasts gorga"), which represents the breasts; together, these represent fertility. Gorga ulu paung is carved on the top of a Batak house. The gorga ulu paung is imbued with metaphysical power and used to ward off evil spirits coming from outside the hamlet.

== See also ==
- Batak architecture
- Pustaha, gecko god depicted on a Batak book cover.
- Naga morsarang, a deity carved onto a Batak potion holder.

== Cited works ==
- Causey, Andrew (2003). Hard Bargaining in Sumatra: Western Travelers and Toba Bataks in the Marketplace of Souvenirs. Hawaii: University of Hawaii Press. ISBN 9780824827472.
- Hasibuan, Jamaludin S. (1982). Primitive Art of the Ancient Batak in Sumatra, Volume 1. Yayasan K.J. Mahoni.
- Manalu, Ismail (1985). Mengenal Batak [Knowing Batak] (in Indonesian). Vol. 1. Kiara.
- Marbu, M.A.; Hutapea, Idris M.T. (1987). Kamus Budaya Batak Toba (in Indonesian). Balai Pustaka. ISBN 9789794071267.
- Napitupulu, S.P. (1997). Sitanggang, Hilderia (ed.). Arsitektur Tradisional Daerah Sumatera Utara. Direktorat Jenderal Kebudayaan.
