= Boraspati ni Tano =

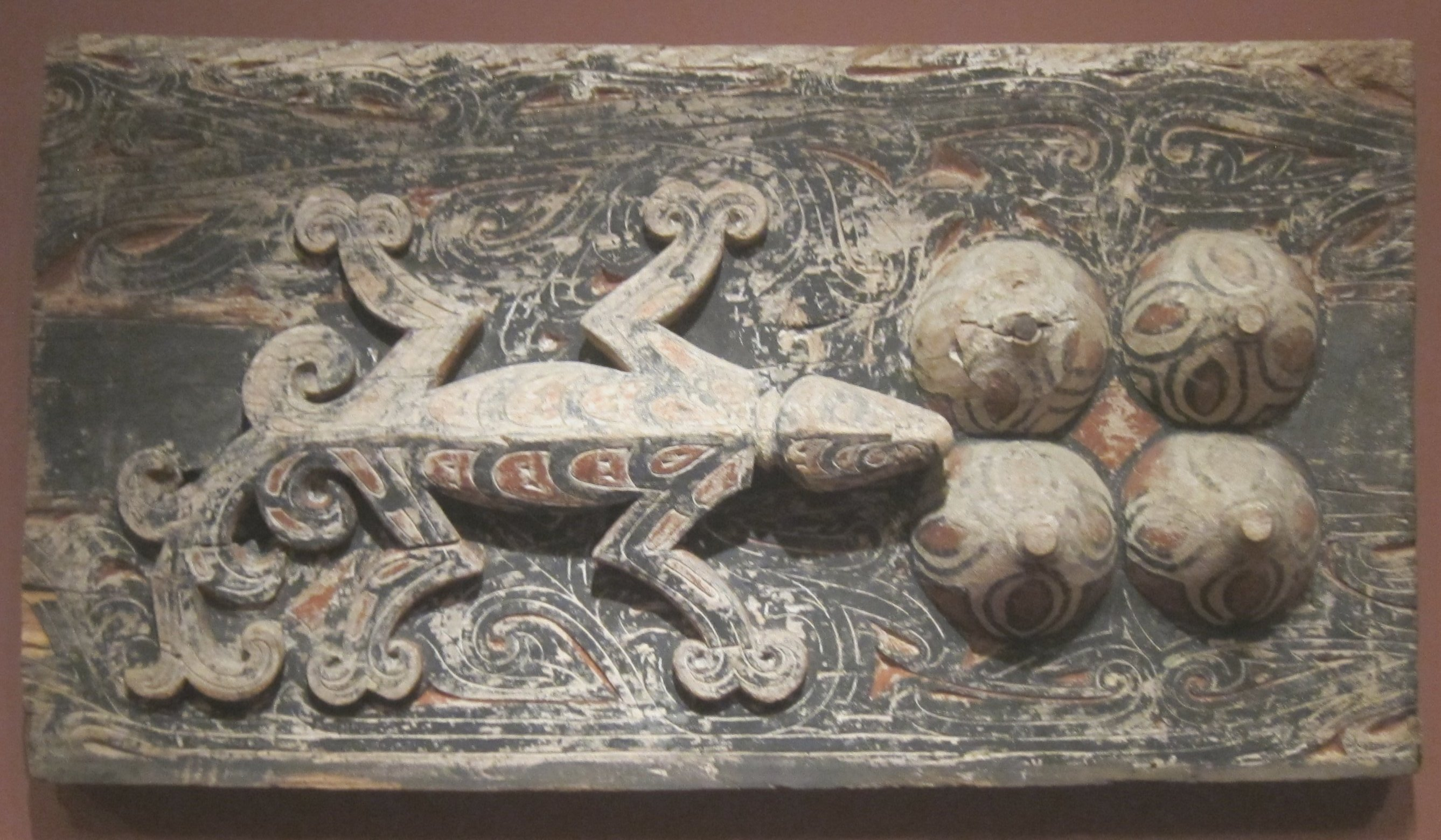
A boraspati motif in a Batak rice granary (sopo).

Boraspati ni Tano or Boraspati, also known as Ilik, is the earth deity in Batak mythology. Boraspati ni Tano is represented as a tokay gecko. Images of Boraspati (or Beraspati in Karo culture) can be found decorating the doors of Batak Karo and Batak Toba buildings, as well as other Batak objects, e.g., the cover of the pustaha or the pupuk container naga morsarang.

== Mythology ==
Boraspati ni Tano is the Earth deity in Batak mythology, representing fertility, wealth and the underworld. The name Boraspati ni Tano is derived from the Sanskrit word Brihaspati, a Hindu astrological representation of Jupiter, and also the name of the day of the week Thursday.

Boraspati ni Tano is one of the most important personifications of natural forces of Batak's cosmology, together with Boru Saniang Naga (water deity). While Boraspati ni Tano is a male god of the earth and the underworld, Boru Saniang Naga is a serpentine female water deity who personifies the storm, the sea, the spring water, and other weather elements that are especially dangerous for the fishermen. Boraspati ni Tano is responsible for the fertility of the land. Because of this, Boraspati ni Tano was frequently mentioned in the public invocations (Batak tonggo-tonggo) as a very important figure. Boraspati ni Tano was invoked at the beginning of any undertaking, such as founding villages and establishing houses (specifically when the offering-pole was planted into the ground). The Batak deities, together with the ancestor spirits, are the focus of the indigenous religion of the Batak before the arrival of Islam and Christianity.

== Astrology ==
The Bataks preserved their animistic Indonesian inheritance and ancestral pattern, while borrowing little from their Islamic and Buddhist neighbors. Although the Bataks are now largely Christians, the Batak ritual calendar was still in regular use with some knowledge of older beliefs. The Batak calendar, known as the porhalaan, consisted of 12 or 13 lunisolar months of 30 days each. The days were named similarly with the naming of days in the Hindu calendar, borrowing the planetary names from the Hindu system. The days are repeated four times, with 2 additional days at the end.

In Hinduism, Brihaspati is associated with Jupiter and the day of the week Thursday. The relation between Brihaspati and Boraspati showed how Hinduism influenced the animistic belief of Batak people.

== Architecture ==
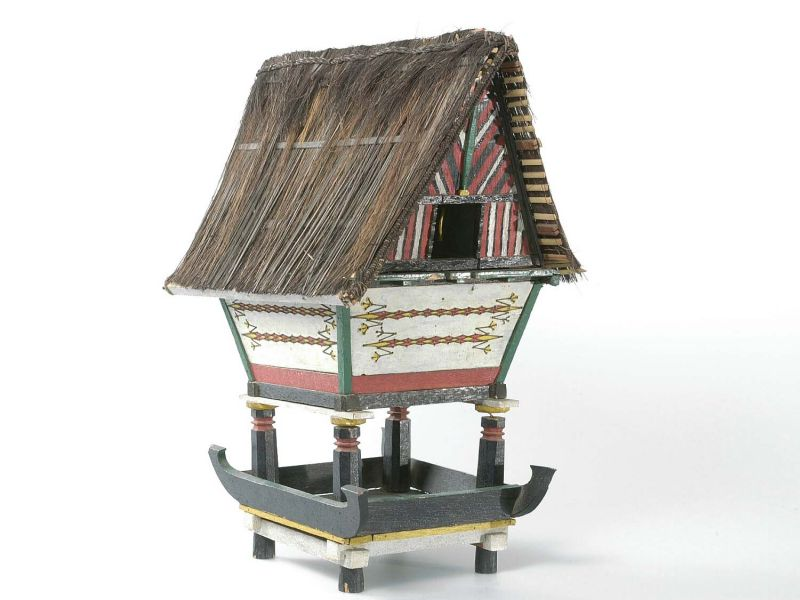
Model of a Batak Karo granary with boraspati motifs.

Boraspati magical motifs (Batak gorga) are often painted on the walls of a Batak house or a granary. Together with other motifs, they form a magic to invoke wealth and fertility into the house.

== Cited works ==
- Kozok, Uli (1999). Warisan Leluhur - Sastra Lama dan Aksara Batak [Ancestor's Heritage - Ancient Literature and Script of Batak] (in Indonesian). Jakarta: Kepustakaan Populer Gramedia. ISBN 9799023335.
- Kozok, Uli (2009). Surat Batak: sejarah perkembangan tulisan Batak : berikut pedoman menulis aksara Batak dan cap Si Singamangaraja XII (PDF) (in Indonesian). École française d'Extrême-Orient. ISBN 9789799101532.
- Kelley, David H.; Milone, Eugene F. (2011). Exploring Ancient Skies: A Survey of Ancient and Cultural Astronomy (2, illustrated ed.). New York: Springer Science & Business Media. ISBN 9781441976246.
- Napitupulu, S.P. (1997). Sitanggang, Hilderia (ed.). Arsitektur Tradisional Daerah Sumatera Utara. Direktorat Jenderal Kebudayaan.
- Vergouwen, J.C. (2013). Keuning, J.; Scott-Kemball, Jeune (eds.). The Social Organisation and Customary Law of the Toba-Batak of Northern Sumatra. Translation series. Vol. 7. Amherst: Springer Science & Business Media. ISBN 9789401510356.

== See also ==
- Rangkiang
- Pustaha
- Naga morsarang
