= Parmalim =

Traditional religion of the Batak people

The term Parmalim or Malim describes the followers of the Malim religion (Ugamo Malim or Batak nation religion), the modern form of the traditional Batak religion. People who are not familiar with the Batak language may erroneously assume Parmalim is the name of the religion rather than its practitioners.

Parmalim in Toba Samosir (ca.1915)

At the end of the 19th and in the beginning of the 20th century the Parmalim movement, which originated in Toba lands spread to other areas of the Batak lands. Especially in the lower Karo lands, the dusun the Malim religion, became very influential as an expression of anti-colonial sentiments at the turn of the 20th century. Today, most Parmalim are Toba Batak. The largest of the several existing Parmalim groups has its centre in Huta Tinggi in the vicinity of Laguboti on the south shore of Lake Toba.

The Malim religion has some similarities with Islam, including a prohibition on the consumption of pork and of blood, and the practice of wearing turbans. Modern Malim deny that these practices were derived from Islam.

One of the first leaders of the Parmalim movement was Raja Mulia Naipospos. Modern Parmalim trace their heritage to Sisingamangaraja XII, a Batak leader in the fight against the Dutch, whose spirit is still alive in his successors. According to Raja Marnakkok Naipospos, a modern Parmalim leader, the faith has often been slandered as devil worship 'Campaigns branding Parmalim as devil worshippers still exist today', he said, 'Batak not familiar with Malim regard it as a heresy. But in fact, Malim recognizes the existence of the one and only Almighty God'. (Mula Jadi Na Bolon in Batak mythology).

== See also ==
- Pemena
