= Naga morsarang =

Ancient medicine container of the Toba Batak people

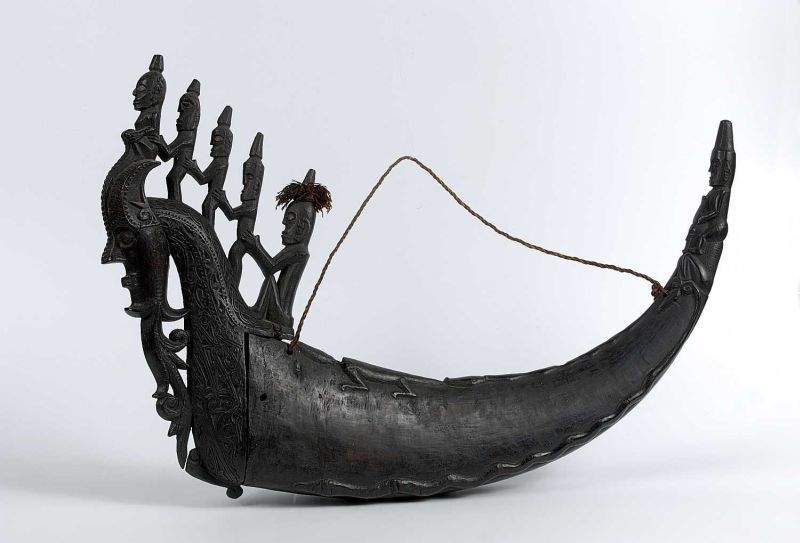
The naga morsarang container with the head of the Singa on the wooden stopper and the lizard-like Boraspati ni Tano on the center.

The naga morsarang, also known as sahan, is a container which is used to store medicine in the culture of the Toba Batak people of North Sumatra, Indonesia. The naga morsarang is created out of the horn of the water buffalo.

== Description ==
Naga morsarang is one of several types of container in which the datu (Batak people's ritual specialist) kept a supernaturally powerful potion. The naga morsarang is made of horn of a water buffalo. A large naga morsarang vessel measures 20.5 inches (52 cm) long and 10.25 inches (26.0 cm) wide. As a container of a powerful potion, the naga morsarang is extensively decorated with complex patterns. The outer surface is incised thoroughly with complex designs. The pointed end of the horn is carved into the shape of a seated figure of a man, or sometimes more. The opening of the horn is plugged with a wooden stopper. This wooden stopper is always shaped into a figure of the singa, a Naga-like underground figures. Many additional figures are sometimes carved as mounting the singa e.g. the lizard Boraspati ni Tano, a human figure, or several human figures. These human figures may represent the datu, owner of the naga morsarang, and the former datus, former owners of the naga morsarang. Others think that these figures represent characters from Batak mythology.

A figure of a lizard, which represents the earth deity Boraspati ni Tano, is sometimes carved inside the hollow of the horn.

== Potions ==
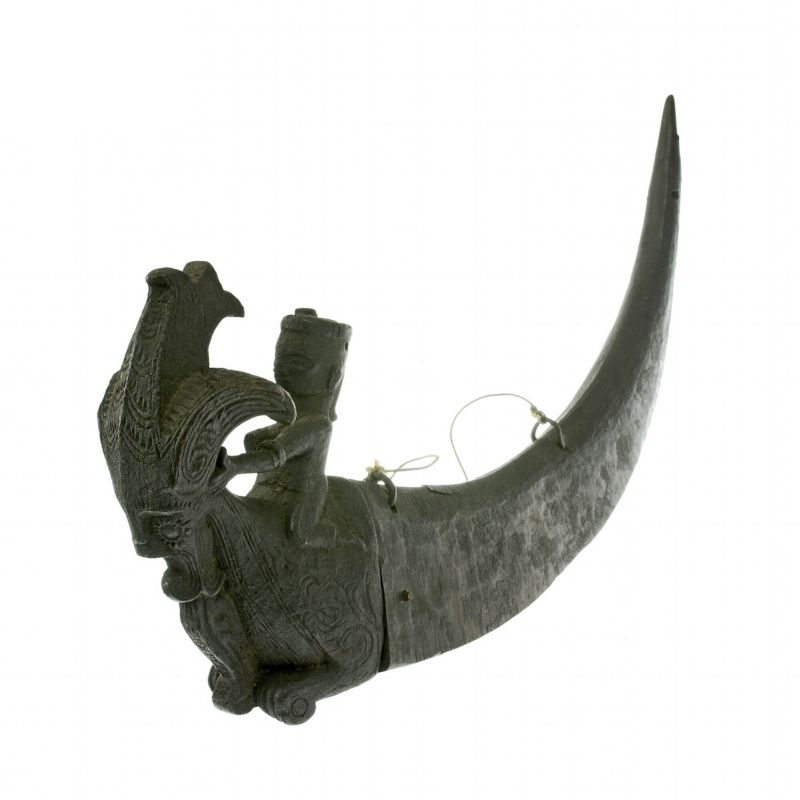
A naga morsarang

The Toba people believed that the spirits of the dead were able to influence the fate of the living. To gain favor from the spirits, the Toba performed elaborate rituals or sacrifices with the help of the datu, a male ritual specialist who acted as intermediaries between the human and supernatural world. The datu created magic books known as the pustaha which was used by him and by his disciples as a reference for his magic rituals. Among the contents of the pustaha are methods to create different kind of potions used for both white magic and black magic in a kind of complex magic ritual. Naga morsarang are used as container for these potions.

One example of a white magic potion is the pagar, a potion used as a kind of amulet to protect from evil. The creation of pagar is very difficult, and can only be done on certain auspicious days. Most of the ingredients of a pagar are derived from plants, although sometimes chicken head, its entrails, and its feathers are included in the mixture. The ingredients for a pagar can only be gathered on certain sacred sites known as the sombaon. Creation of a pagar took days or weeks. All the ingredients are then cooked and finely crushed into a kind of paste which is then stored in the naga morsarang.

== Similar vessel ==
The Karo version of the vessel known as perminaken/parminaken or guri-guri. Instead of strictly a bull's horn, the perminaken may use other types of material for the vessel e.g. a bamboo, a gourd, or even a Ming period jar imported from China. The perminaken similarly use a wooden stopper with carvings of a figure of the singa, a person, or a person riding the singa.

== See also ==
- Tunggal panaluan

== Cited works ==
- Bonatz, Dominik; Miksic, John; Neidel, J. David (2009). From Distant Tales: Archaeology and Ethnohistory in the Highlands of Sumatra. Cambridge Scholars Publishing. ISBN 9781443807845.
- Kozok, Uli (2009). Surat Batak: sejarah perkembangan tulisan Batak : berikut pedoman menulis aksara Batak dan cap Si Singamangaraja XII (PDF) (in Indonesian). École française d'Extrême-Orient. ISBN 9789799101532.
- Sitepu, Andrianus G. (1980). Mengenal seni kerajinan tradisional Karo [Understanding the Traditional Arts and Crafts of the Karo] (in Indonesian). Eʼ Karya.
- NAGA MORSARANG 440mm CONTAINER, Borneoartifact
