= Batak =

Austronesian ethnic group of Indonesia

Batak Bataks
Batak: Halak Batak Script (Toba Batak variant): ᯂᯞᯂ᯲ ᯅᯖᯂ᯲ Indonesian: Orang Batak
- Bonang Manalu

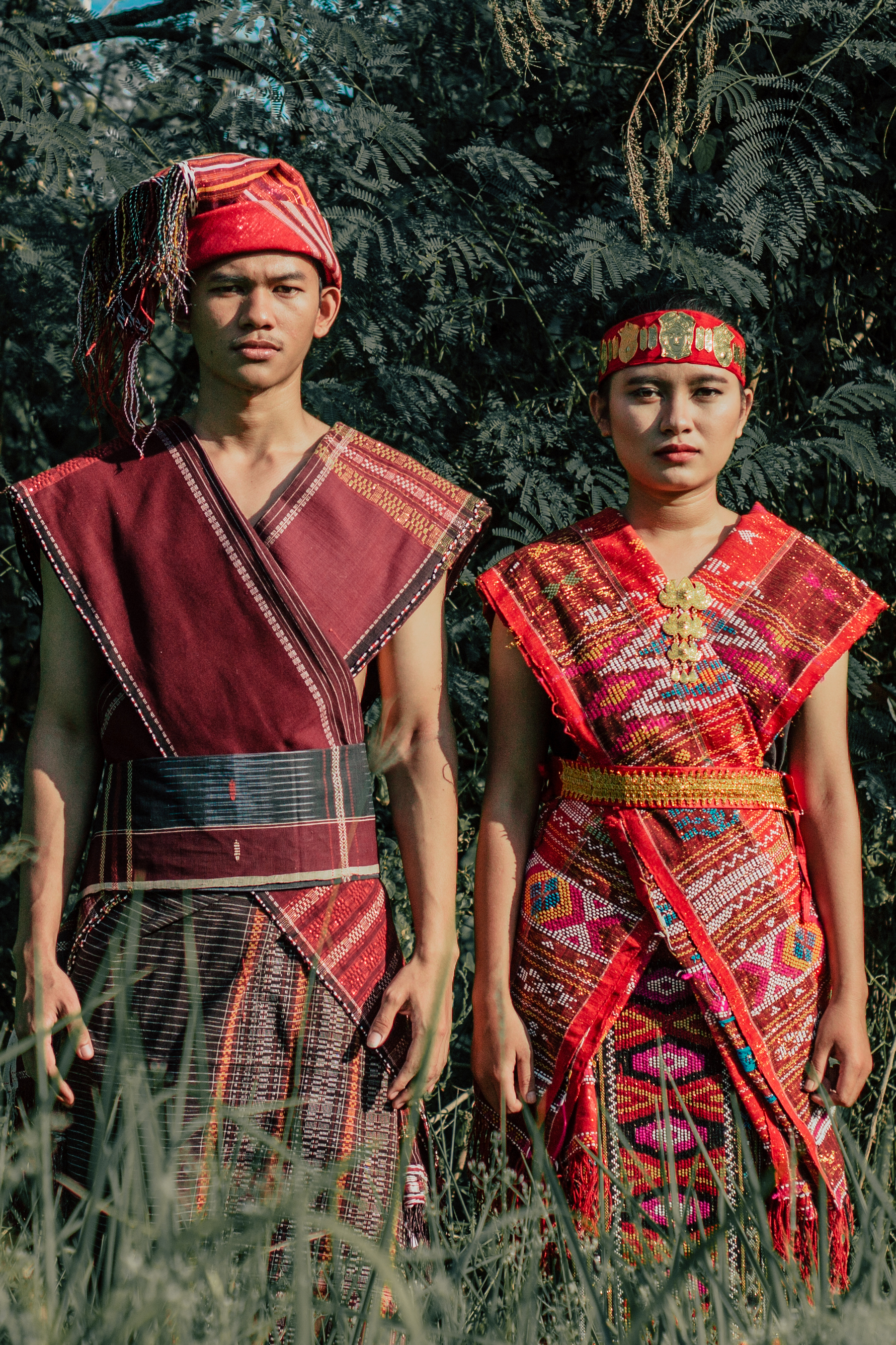
- Toba Batak male and female wearing traditional clothes

Total population
- 8,466,969 (2010 census)

Regions with significant populations
- Indonesia: 8,466,969
- North Sumatra: 5,785,716
- Riau: 691,399
- West Java: 467,438
- Jakarta: 326,645
- West Sumatra: 222,549
- Riau Islands: 208,678
- Aceh: 147,295
- Banten: 139,259
- Jambi: 106,249
- Diaspora: 30,000+
- Malaysia: 30,000
- Singapore: unknown
- United States: unknown
- Netherlands: unknown
- Australia: unknown

Languages
- Batak languages; incl. Toba (Lake Toba), Karo (Karo Regency), Simalungun (Simalungun Regency), Pardembanan (Asahan Regency), Pakpak-Dairi (Dairi Regency and Pakpak Bharat Regency), Angkola (South Tapanuli Regency), Mandailing (Mandailing Natal Regency)

Religion
- • Christianity (Protestantism and Catholicism) 55.62% • Sunni Islam 44.17% • Buddhism 0.11% • Hinduism 0.017% • Traditional religions (Parmalim and Pemena) 0.08%

Related ethnic groups
- Austronesian peoples; Gayo; Nias; Mentawai; Minangkabau; Malay

Batak (Note: /ˈbatək/ BAT-ək; Batak script in Toba Batak variant: ᯅᯖᯂ᯲) is a collective term used to identify a number of closely related Austronesian ethnic groups predominantly found in North Sumatra and parts of adjacent provinces, Indonesia, who speak the Batak languages. The term always includes the Toba, Karo, Simalungun, Pakpak-Dairi, Angkola and Mandailing, as well as other related ethnic groups with distinct languages and traditional customs (adat).

== History ==
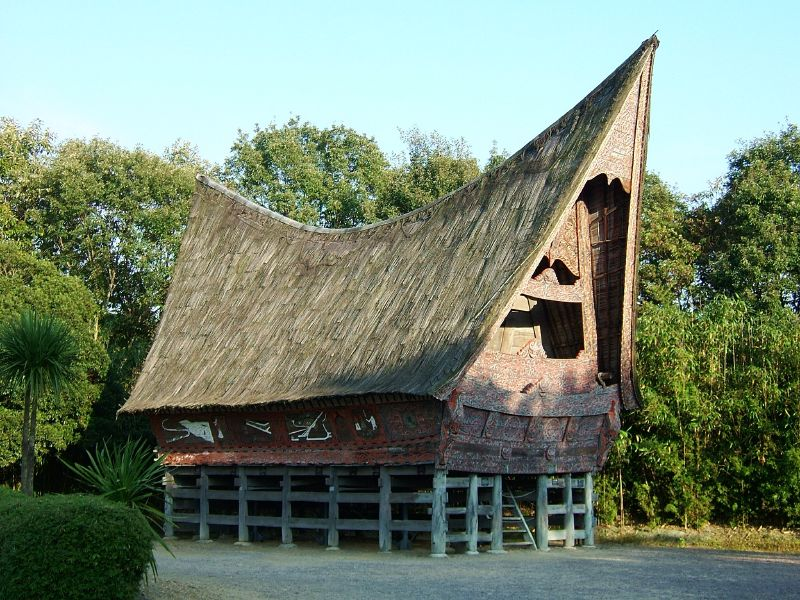
A traditional Toba Batak house (see Batak architecture).

=== Prehistory ===
While the archaeology of southern Sumatra testifies to the existence of Neolithic settlers, it seems that the northern part of Sumatra was settled by agriculturalists at a considerably later stage. Although the Batak are often considered to be isolated peoples due to their location inland, there is evidence that they have been involved in trade with neighbouring kingdoms for a millennium or more.

The Bataks practiced a syncretic religion of Hinduism and ancestor worshipping for thousands of years. The Batak may be mentioned in Zhao Rugua's 13th-century Description of the Barbarous Peoples, which refers to a 'Ba-ta' dependency of Srivijaya. The Suma Oriental, of the 15th century, also refers to the kingdom of Bata, bounded by Pasai and the Aru kingdom.

Based on this evidence, the Batak may have been involved in procuring important commodities such as camphor, benzoin, and other forest products, but also pepper, for trade with China, perhaps from the 8th or 9th centuries and continuing for the next thousand years. Batak men carried the products on their backs for sale at ports.

It has been suggested that the important port of Barus in Tapanuli was populated by Batak people. A Tamil inscription has been found in Barus which is dated to 1088. Contact with Chinese and Tamil traders took place at Kota Cina, a trading town located in what is now northern Medan that was established in the 11th century. It comprised 10,000 people by the 12th century. Tamil remains have been found on key trade routes to the Batak lands.

These trading opportunities may have caused migration of Batak from Pakpak and Toba to the present-day Karo and Simalungun 'frontier' lands, where they were exposed to greater influence from visiting Tamil traders. The migration of Batak to the Angkola-Mandailing lands may have been prompted by 8th-century Srivijayan demand for camphor.

The Karo marga or tribe Sembiring ("black one") is believed to have originated from their ties with Tamil traders. Specific Sembiring sub-marga, namely Brahmana, Colia, Pandia, Depari, Meliala, Muham, Pelawi, and Tekan, are all of Indian origin. Tamil influence on Karo religious practices are also noted, with the pekualuh secondary cremation ritual being specific to the Karo and Dairi people. Moreover, the Pustaka Kembaren, an origin story of the Sembiring Kembaren, suggests linkages with Pagaruyung in the Minangkabau Highlands.

From the 16th century onward, Aceh increased the production of pepper, an important export commodity, in exchange for rice, which grew well in the Batak wetlands. Batak people in different areas cultivated either sawah (wet rice fields) or ladang (dry rice). The Toba Batak, most expert in agriculture, must have migrated to meet demand in new areas. The increasing importance of rice had religious significance, which increased the power of the Batak high priests, who had responsibility for ensuring agricultural success.

== Language ==
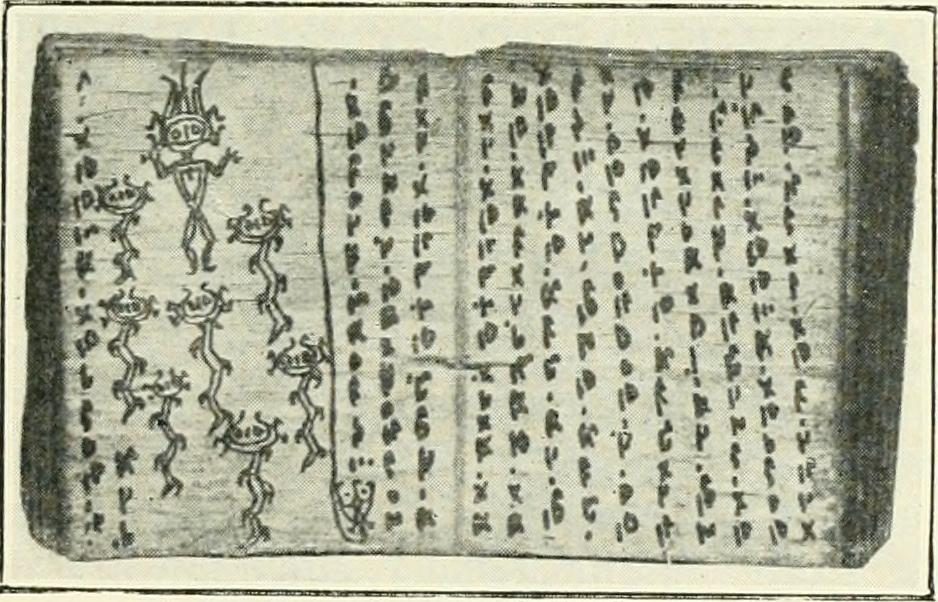
Bark book with charms written in native Batak script, 1910.

The Batak speak a variety of closely related languages, all members of the Austronesian language family. There are two major branches, a northern branch comprising the Pakpak-Dairi, Alas-Kluet, and Karo languages, which are similar to each other, and a distinct southern branch, comprising three mutually intelligible dialects: Toba, Pardembanan, Angkola, and Mandailing. Simalungun is an early offspring of the southern branch. Some Simalungun dialects can be understood by speakers of Batak Karo, whereas other dialects of Simalungun can be understood by speakers of Toba. This is due to the existence of a linguistic continuum that often blurs the lines between the Batak dialects. Batak dialect still influences the dialects in Medan city today.

The Batak possess their own script known as the Surat Batak. The writing has chiefly ceremonial importance within traditional religious ceremonies, and was subject to little change for this reason. It is likely that the Batak people originally received their writing system from southern Sumatra.

=== Contribution to modern Malay and Indonesian literature ===
In the broader context of national language, the modern Batak authors are well-known as the Malay-speaking writers that shape modern Malay into the national concept of Bahasa Indonesia (Indonesian language) and its literary canon. These include novelist Merari Siregar (Azab dan Sengsara), Muhammad Kasim Dalimunte (Teman Doedoek), Soeman Hasiboean (Kawan Bergeloet and Mentjahari Pentjoeri Anak Perawan), Mochtar Lubis (Senja di Jakarta) and Iwan Simatupang (Ziarah); poets Sitor Situmorang; as well as literary critic Bakri Siregar.

== Profession ==
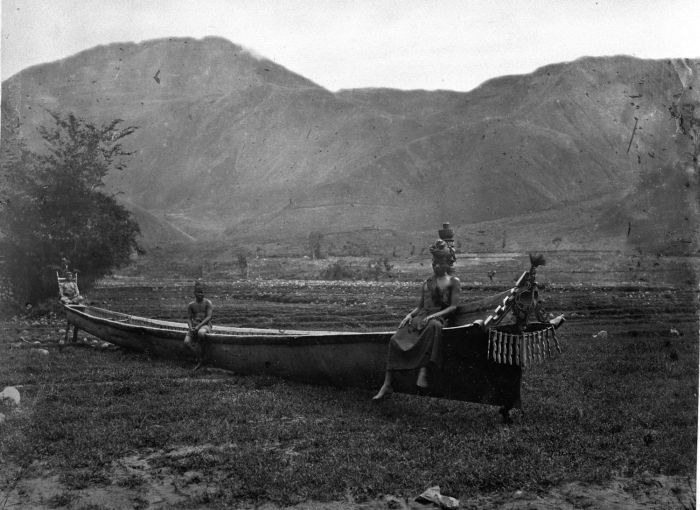
Traditional boat (c. 1870), photograph by Kristen Feilberg.

The traditional occupation of the Batak was agriculture, hunting and farming. The great lake of Toba provided vast opportunity for freshwater aquaculture since ancient times. Interior rural Batak communities relied heavily on rice farming, horticulture and other plant and commercial crops, and to some extent, acquiring forest products, such as hard wood, plant resin, and wild animals.

The port of Barus on the western coast of Batak lands has become famous as the source of kapur barus (camphor). In ancient times, Batak warriors were often recruited by neighboring Malay courts as mercenaries. In the colonial era, the Dutch introduced commercial cash crops, such as coffee, sawit palm oil, and rubber, converting some parts of the Batak land into plantations.

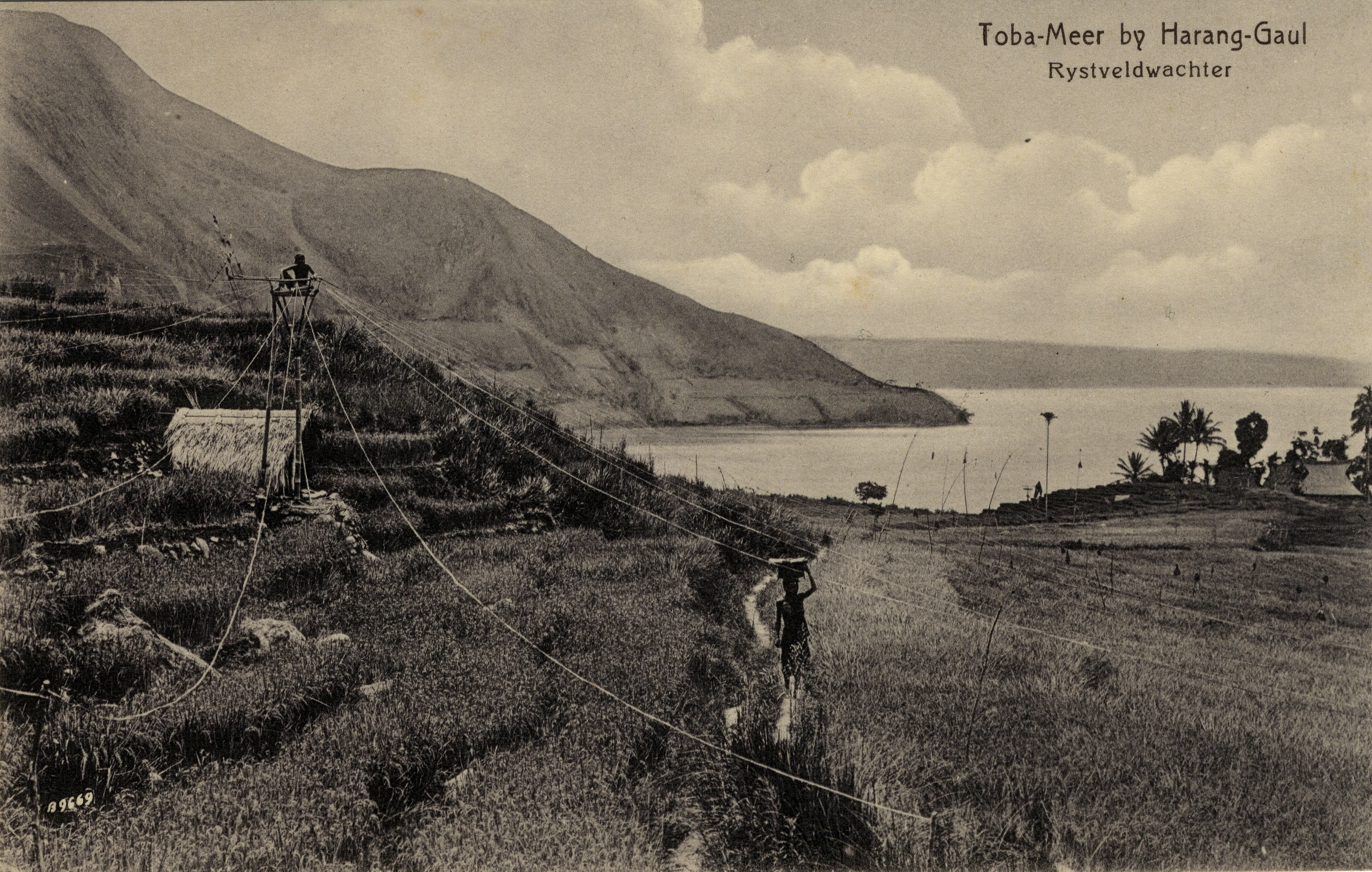
Man guarding a rice field against birds in Haranggaol, North Sumatera. Farming and agriculture is one of main source of living around Lake Toba

Throughout the history of modern Indonesia, the Batak community has made significant contributions. Batak people have engaged in a wide range of occupations, from running modest tire service workshops to serving as state ministers. Today, many Batak individuals are drawn to professions such as bus and taxi drivers, mechanics, engineers, singers and musicians, writers and journalists, teachers, economists, scientists, military officers, and attorneys. Although the Batak represent a minority within the Indonesian population (3.58%; approximately 8–9 million Batak people out of 236 million according to the 2010 census), many notable Batak individuals have achieved prominent positions, particularly in the field of law, such as Adnan Buyung Nasution who founded the Lembaga Bantuan Hukum Jakarta (LBH Jakarta), Todung Mulya Lubis, Ruhut Sitompul and Hotman Paris Hutapea.

== Society ==
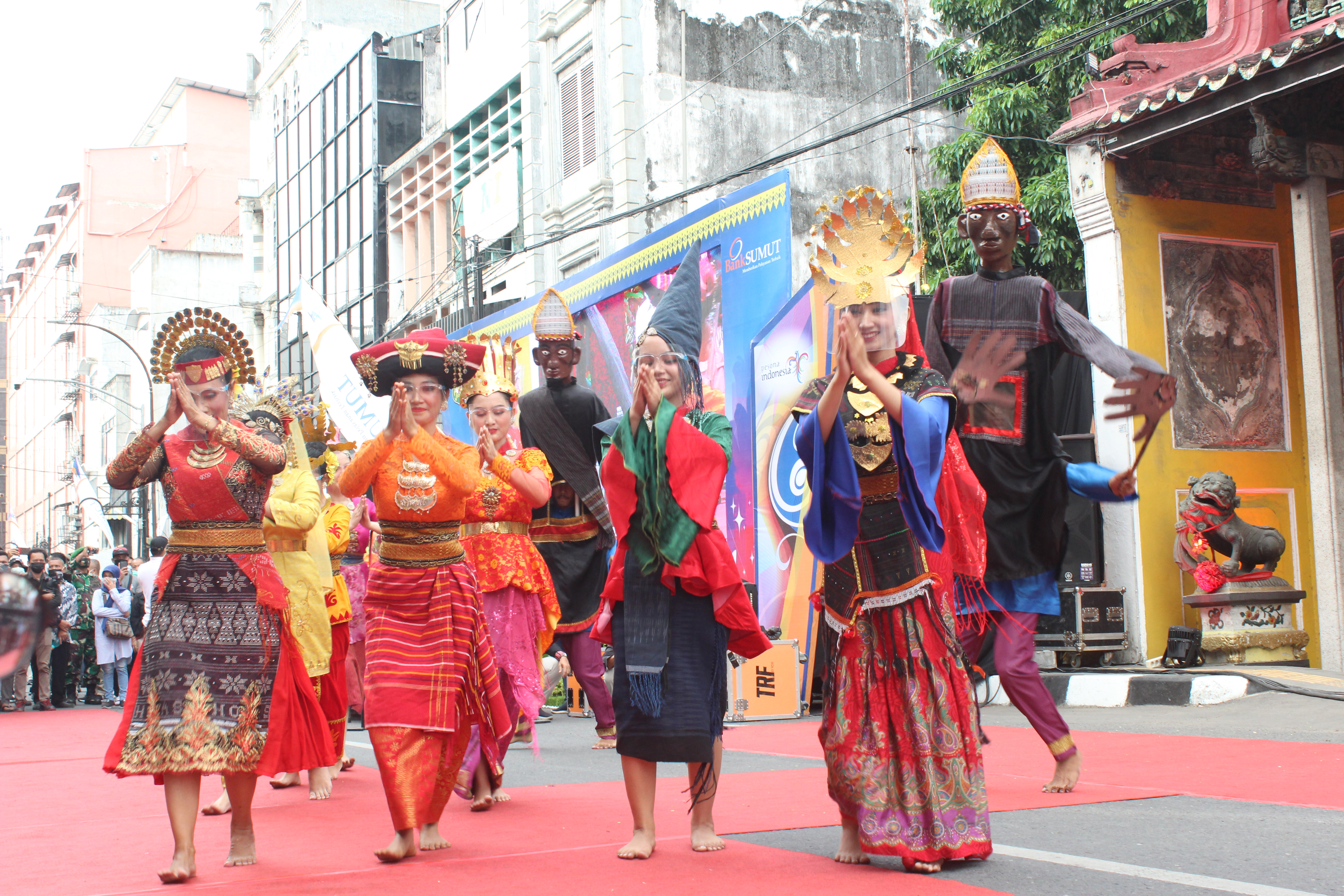
The Batak sub-ethnics (Toba, Karo, Pakpak, Mandailing) dancing Tor-tor or Manortor in Kesawan, Medan, 2021

Batak societies are patriarchally organized along clans known as Marga. A traditional belief among the Toba Batak is that they originate from one ancestor "Si Raja Batak", with all Margas descended from him. A family tree that defines the father-son relationship among Batak people is called tarombo. In contemporary Indonesia, the Batak people have a strong focus on education and a prominent position in the professions, particularly as teachers, engineers, doctors and lawyers. Toba Batak are known traditionally for their weaving, wood carving and especially ornate stone tombs.

Before they became subjects of the colonial Dutch East Indies government, the Batak had a reputation for being fierce warriors. Today the Batak are mostly Christian with a Muslim minority. Currently the largest Christian congregation in Indonesia is the HKBP (Huria Kristen Batak Protestan) Christian church. The dominant Christian theology was brought by Lutheran German missionaries in the 19th century, including the well-known missionary Ludwig Ingwer Nommensen. Christianity was introduced to the Karo by Dutch Calvinist missionaries, and their largest church is the GBKP (Gereja Batak Karo Protestan). The Mandailing and Angkola Batak were converted to Islam in the early 19th century during the reign of Minangkabaus Padri. A significant minority of Batak people do not adhere to either Christianity or Islam, however, and follow traditional practices known as the agama si dekah, the old religion, which is also called perbegu or pemena.

=== Dalihan Na Tolu ===
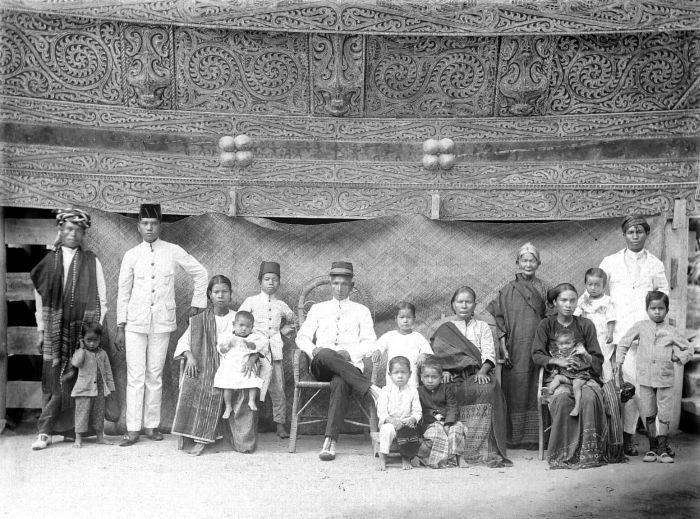
Head or higher class Toba Batak man with his family in their home with the carved head of Toba Batak family "adathuis" or Roemah Adat Tapanoeli in North Sumatra, c. 1900

Dalihan Na Tolu (three-legged furnace) is the philosophy of life of the Batak people. It consisted of three general rules in Batak society. Those are:

1. Somba Marhulahula (showing respect to wife's family). Even though somba could mean worship, in Dalihan Na Tolu, it means respect to those with wife family and those with the same clan (Marga (Batak)). Those family includes wife of the grandfathers, wife of the fathers, and wife of the children.
2. Elek Marboru (showing kindness to all women). Kindness in this context means not accompanied by ulterior motives and self-interest. Also, women in this context means the family who marry the daughter, including the daughter itself.
3. Manat Mardongan Tubu (careful in living with close relatives). Living carefully means a cautious attitude towards fellow Marga to prevent misunderstandings in the implementation of custom tradition events. This act was reflected in the Batak proverb "hau na jonok do na boi marsiogoson" (only woods that are really close can cause friction). This illustrates that it is in close and frequent intercourse that possible conflicts of interest, status, etc. can occur

The essence of this teachings is the moral code contains the teachings of mutual respect (masipasangapon) with the support of the moral rule: mutual respect and helpfulness.

=== Ritual cannibalism ===
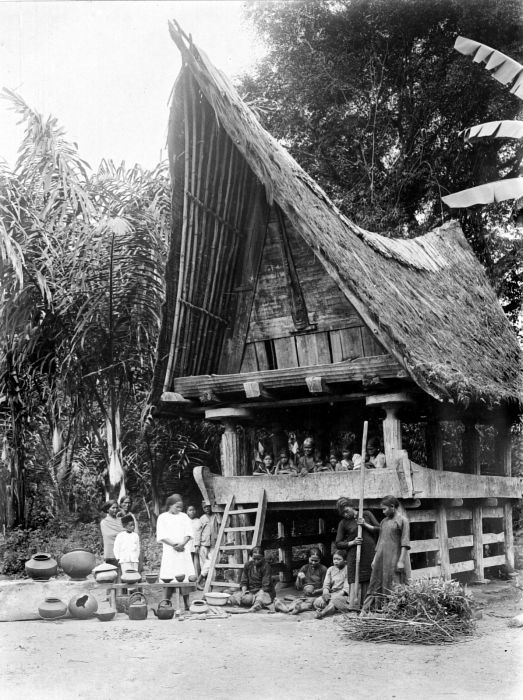
Pottery making by Batak women in Tarutung, Batak-country; Dutch East Indies era.

Ritual cannibalism was well documented among pre-colonial Batak people, being performed in order to strengthen the eater's tendi. In particular, the blood, heart, palms and soles of the feet were seen as rich in tendi.

In Marco Polo’s memoirs of his stay on the east coast of Sumatra (then called Java Minor) from April to September 1292, he mentions an encounter with hill folk whom he refers to as "man-eaters". From secondary sources, Marco Polo recorded stories of ritual cannibalism among the "Battas". Marco Polo's stay was restricted to the coastal areas, and he never ventured inland to directly verify such claims. Despite never personally witnessing these events, he was nonetheless willing to pass on descriptions which were provided to him, in which a condemned man was eaten: "They suffocate him. And when he is dead they have him cooked, and gather together all the dead man's kin, and eat him. And I assure you they do suck the very bones till not a particle of marrow remains in them...And so they eat him up stump and rump. And when they have thus eaten him they collect his bones and put them in fine chests, and carry them away, and place them in caverns among the mountains where no beast nor other creature can get at them. And you must know also that if they take prisoner a man of another country, and he cannot pay a ransom in coin, they kill him and eat him straightway.

The Venetian Niccolò de' Conti (1395–1469) spent most of 1421 in Sumatra in the course of a long trading journey to Southeast Asia (1414–1439), and wrote a brief description of the inhabitants: "In a part of the island called Batech live cannibals who wage continual war on their neighbors."

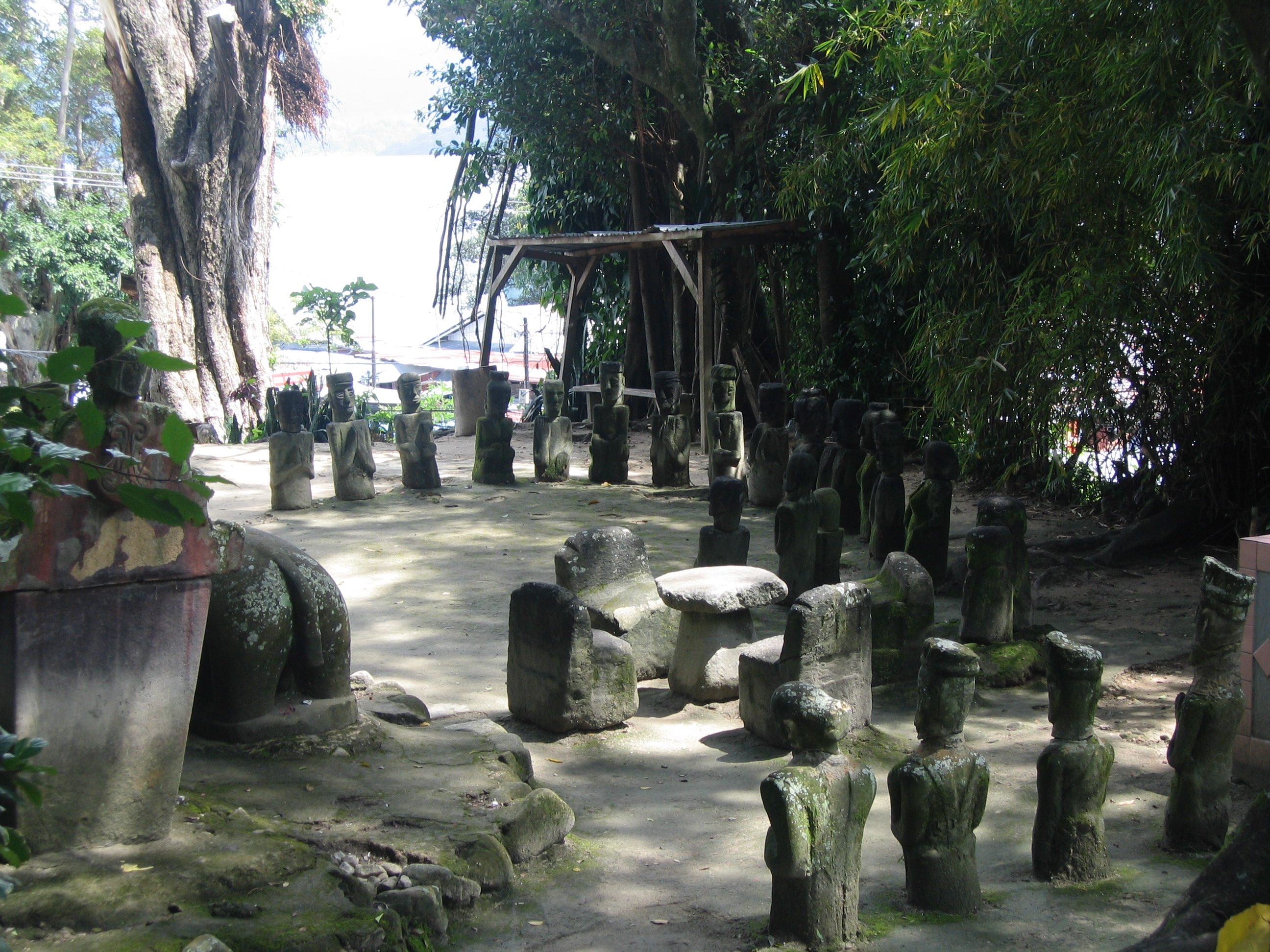
Judgement Place of Toba Batak.

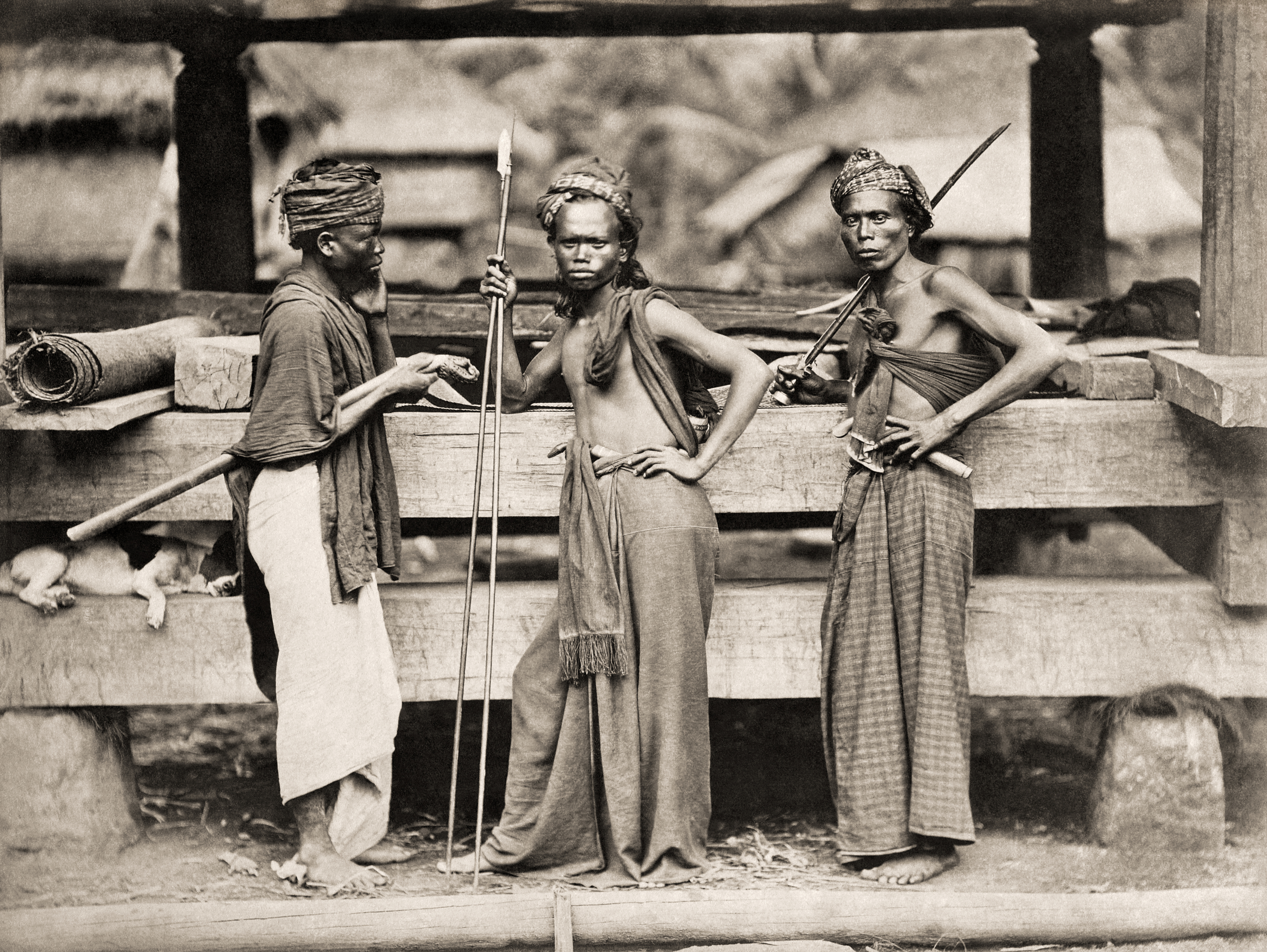
Batak warriors, 1870.

Sir Thomas Stamford Raffles in the 1820s studied the Batak and their rituals and laws regarding the consumption of human flesh, writing in detail about the transgressions that warranted such an act as well as their methods. Raffles stated that "It is usual for the people to eat their parents when too old to work," and that for certain crimes a criminal would be eaten alive: "The flesh is eaten raw or grilled, with lime, salt and a little rice."

The German physician and geographer Franz Wilhelm Junghuhn visited the Batak lands between 1840 and 1841. Junghuhn says about cannibalism among the Batak (whom he called "Battaer"): "People do the honest Battaer an injustice when it is said that they sell human flesh in the markets, and that they slaughter their old people as soon as they are unfit for work...They eat human flesh only in wartime, when they are enraged, and in a few legal instances." Junghuhn tells how after a perilous and hungry flight he arrived in a friendly village, and the food that was offered by his hosts was the flesh of two prisoners who had been slaughtered the day before, however he maintains that the Batak exaggerated their love of human flesh in order to frighten off would-be invaders and to gain occasional employment as mercenaries for the coastal tribes who were plagued by pirates.

Oscar von Kessel visited Silindung in the 1840s and in 1844 was probably the first European to observe a Batak cannibalistic ritual in which a convicted adulterer was eaten alive. His description parallels that of Marsden in some important respects, however von Kessel states that cannibalism was regarded by the Batak as a judicial act and its application was restricted to very narrowly defined infringements of the law including theft, adultery, spying or treason. Salt, red pepper and lemons had to be provided by the relatives of the victim as a sign that they accepted the verdict of the community and were not thinking of revenge.

Ida Laura Pfeiffer visited the Batak in August 1852 and although she did not observe any cannibalism, she was told that:

"Prisoners of war are tied to a tree and beheaded at once; but the blood is carefully preserved for drinking, and sometimes made into a kind of pudding with boiled rice. The body is then distributed; the ears, the nose, and the soles of the feet are the exclusive property of the Rajah, who has besides a claim on other portions. The palms of the hands, the soles of the feet, the flesh of the head, and the heart and liver, are reckoned peculiar delicacies, and the flesh in general is roasted and eaten with salt. The Regents assured me, with a certain air of relish, that it was very good food, and that they had not the least objection to eat it. The women are not allowed to take part in these grand public dinners."

Samuel Munson and Henry Lyman, American Baptist missionaries to the Batak, were cannibalized in 1834. Dutch and German missionaries to the Batak in the late 19th century observed a few instances of cannibalism and wrote lurid descriptions to their home parishes in order to raise donations for further missions. The growing Dutch influence in northern Sumatra led to increased Malay influence in coastal trade and plantations, pushing the Karo farther inland. Growing ethnic tensions culminated in the 1872 Karo Rebellion where the Karo were suppressed by Dutch and Malay forces. Despite this, Karo resistance to Dutch imperialism lingered into the early 20th century. In 1890 the Dutch colonial government banned cannibalism in the regions under their control. Rumors of Batak cannibalism survived into the early 20th century but it seems probable that the custom was rare after 1816, due partially to the influence of Islam.

=== Tarombo ===
Family tree or lineage is a very important thing for the Batak, as those who do not know the lineage will be considered as a strayed (nalilu) Batak. Batak people are required to know their lineage or at least the ancestors of which the family name (Marga (Batak)) and the related clans (dongan tubu) came from. This is necessary in order to determine the relation of a kinship (partuturanna) within a clan or simply the surname (Marga (Batak)) itself.

== Geography ==
The Batak lands consist of North Sumatra province, excluding Nias island, the historically Malay kingdoms of the east coast and the western coast of Minangkabau people. In addition, part of the Karo lands extend into modern-day East Aceh Regency in Aceh province, while parts of the Mandailing lands lie in Rokan Hulu Regency in Riau. Significant numbers of Batak have migrated in recent years to prosperous neighbouring Riau province.

To the south of North Sumatra are the Muslim Minangkabau of West Sumatra, while to the north there are various Muslim Acehnese peoples.

== Traditional Batak religion ==
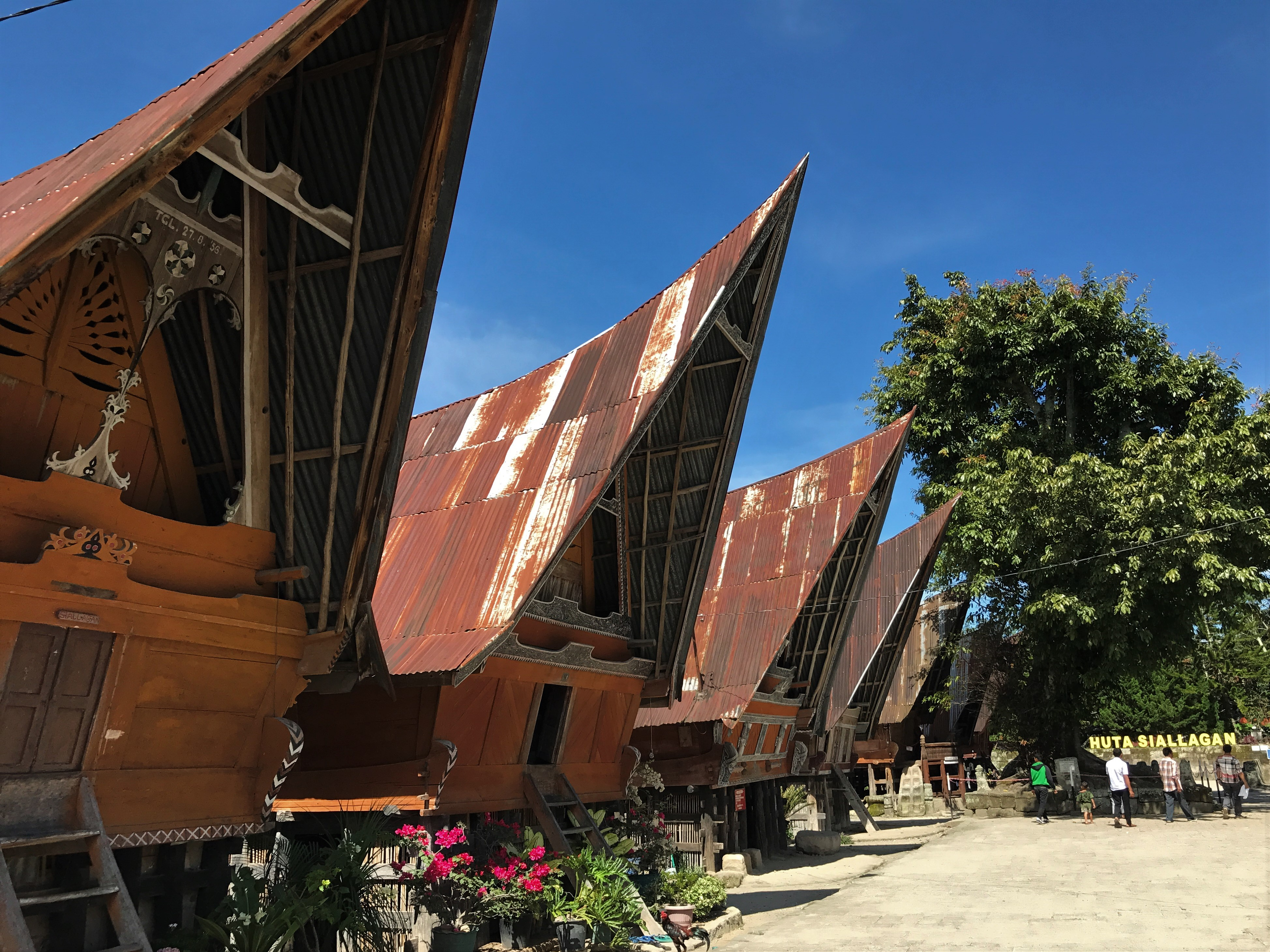
Batak village on Huta Siallagan, Samosir island.

The various Batak cultures differ in their pre-colonial religious ideas as they do in many other aspects of culture. Information about the old religious ideas of the Mandailing and Angkola in southern Batakland is incomplete, and very little is known about the religion of the Pakpak and Simalungun Batak. For the Toba and Karo on the other hand the evidence in the writings of missionaries and colonial administrators is relatively abundant. Information on the traditional forms of Batak religion is derived mainly from the writings of German and Dutch missionaries who became increasingly concerned with Batak beliefs towards the end of the 19th century.

Various influences affected the Batak through their contact with Tamil and Javanese traders and settlers in southern Batakland, and the east and west coast near Barus and Tapanuli, in particular the large Padang Lawas temple complex in Tapanuli. These contacts took place many centuries ago and it is impossible to reconstruct just how far the religious ideas of these foreigners were adopted and reworked by the Batak. It is suggested that the Batak adopted aspects of these religions, specifically Mahayana Buddhist, Shaivist, and Tantrist practices within their own customs.

The modern Indonesian state is founded on the principles of pancasila, which requires the belief in 'one and only God', the practice of either Protestantism, Catholicism, Islam, Buddhism or Hinduism, one of which must be entered on an individual's KTP. Traditional religions are not officially recognised, and accordingly traditional religions are increasingly marginalised. The traditional Batak religion are still practised as Parmalim by a small community or alongside Christianity.

=== Creation myths ===
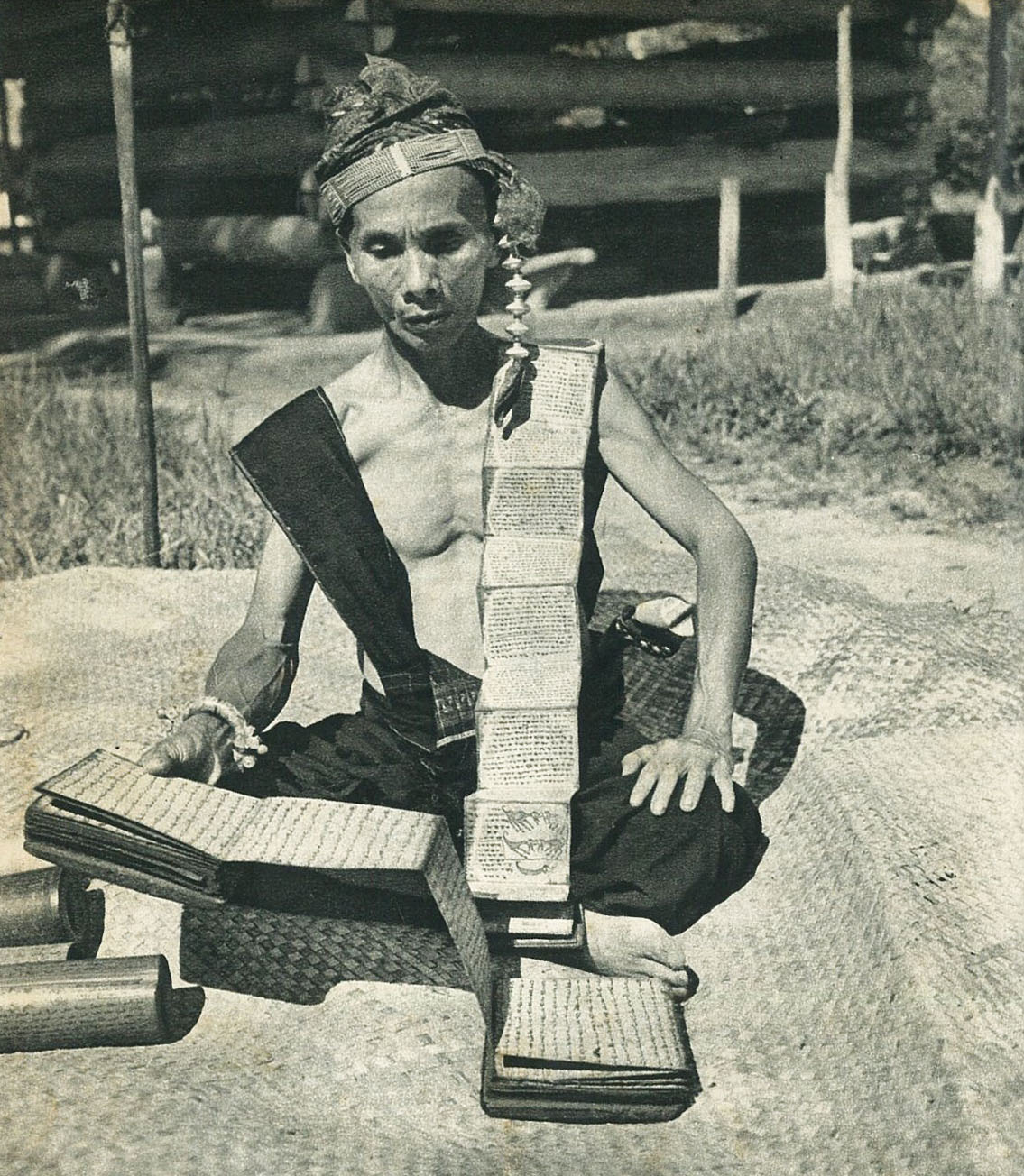
A Batak priest or known as Datuk with Book of Pustaha or Batak wizard book, circa 1952

There are many different versions in circulation. These were formerly passed down through oral tradition but have now been written down in the local languages. There are also large collections of Batak tales collected by European scholars since the mid-19th century and recorded in European languages, mostly Dutch.

At the beginning of time there was only the sky with a great sea beneath it. In the sky lived the gods and the sea was the home of a mighty underworld dragon Naga Padoha. The earth did not yet exist and human beings, too, were as yet unknown. All the surviving myths record that at the beginning of creation stands the god Mula Jadi Na Bolon. His origin remains uncertain. A rough translation of the name is the "beginning of becoming". The creation of everything that exists can be traced back to him. Mula Jadi lives in the upper world which is usually thought of as divided into seven levels. His three sons, Batara Guru, Mangalabulan and Soripada were born from eggs laid by a hen fertilized by Mula Jadi. Two swallows act as messengers and helpers to Mula Jadi in his act of creation. Their functions vary in the different versions. Mula Jadi begets three daughters whom he gives as wives for his three sons. Mankind is the result of the union of the three couples. Besides the three sons of Mula Jadi there is another god, Asiasi, whose place and function in the world of the gods remains largely unclear. There is some evidence that Asiasi can be seen as the balance and unity of the trinity of gods.

The ruler of the underworld, i. e. the primeval sea, is the serpent-dragon Naga Padoha. He too existed before the beginning and seems to be the opponent of Mula Jadi. As ruler of the underworld Naga Padoha also has an important function in the creation of the earth.

What all the six gods so far mentioned have in common is that they play a minor role in ritual. They do not receive any sacrificial offerings from the faithful and no places of sacrifice are built for them. They are merely called on in prayers for help and assistance.

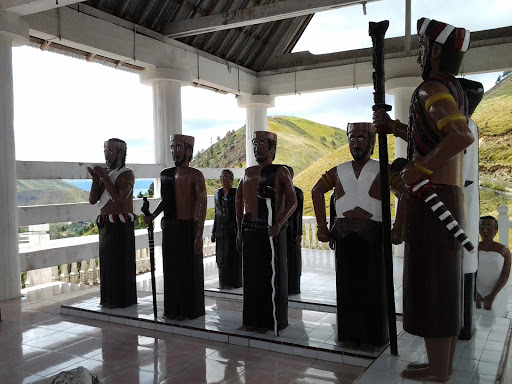
Monument of Sopo Guru Taea Bulan that depicting history of Siraja Batak (King of Batak), located in Samosir Island, North Sumatera

The origin of the earth and of mankind is connected mainly with the daughter of Batara Guru, Sideak Parujar, who is the actual creator of the earth. She flees from her intended husband, the lizard-shaped son of Mangalabulan, and lets herself down on a spun thread from the sky to the middle world which at that time was still just a watery waste. She refuses to go back but feels very unhappy. Out of compassion Mula Jadi sends his granddaughter a handful of earth so that she can find somewhere to live. Sideak Parudjar was ordered to spread out this earth and thus the earth became broad and long. But the goddess was not able to enjoy her rest for long. The earth had been spread out on the head of Naga Padoha, the dragon of the underworld who lived in the water. He groaned under the weight and attempted to get rid of it by rolling around. The earth was softened by water and threatened to be utterly destroyed. With the help of Mula Jadi and by her own cunning Sideak Parudjar was able to overcome the dragon. She thrust a sword into the body of Naga Padoha up to the hilt and laid him in an iron block. Whenever Naga Padoha twists in the fetters an earthquake occurs.

After the lizard-shaped son of Mangalabulan, the husband the gods intended for her, had taken another name and another form, Sideak Parujar marries him. Sideak Parujar becomes the mother of twins of different sexes. When the two have grown up their divine parents return to the upper world leaving the couple behind on the earth. Mankind is the result of their incestuous union. The couple settle on Pusuk Buhit, a volcano on the western shore of Lake Toba, and found the village of Si Anjur Mulamula. The mythological ancestor of the Batak, Si Raja Batak is one of their grandchildren.

=== The tendi cult ===
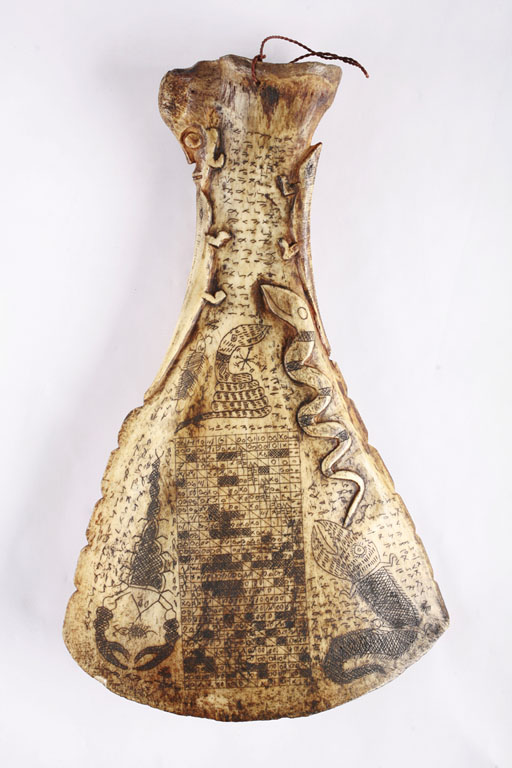
A 20th-century carved bone of a Porhalaan Batak calendar.

In the religious world of the Toba and Karo Batak the gods and the creation of mankind are far less significant than the complex concepts connected with the tendi (Karo) or tondi (Toba) and the begu. Probably the most useful translations of these terms are "life-soul" and "death-soul". A person receives his "life-soul" (tendi) from Mula Jadi Na Bolon before he is born. The destiny of the individual tendi is decided by the tendi itself before birth. Various myths are woven around manner in which the tendi choose their destiny from Mula Jadi. Warneck, a missionary and for a long time superintendent (ephorus) of the Batak Church, recorded two particularly expressive myths in his major work on Batak religion. What is significant is that the tendi themselves are responsible for their destiny:

"Mula Jadi presents him with all kinds of things to choose from. If the tendi asks for ripe eggs, then the person whom he animates will be a poor fellow; if he asks for flowers, then he will live only a short time; if he asks for a hen, the person will be restless; rags indicate poverty; an old mat, lack of fame; a gold piece, wealth; plate, spear, medicine pot indicate that he will become a great chief or understand magic arts."

"With Mula Jadi in the upper world is a mighty tree called Djambubarus. Mula Jadi has written on all its leaves. On one leaf is written 'many children', on others 'wealth' or 'respect' and so on. 'Contemptible life', 'poverty', 'wretchedness' are also written on the leaves. All the possible different fates of the person are entered on the leaves. Every tendi that wishes to descend to the middle world must first ask Mula Jadi for one of the leaves. Whatever is written on the leaf chosen by him will be his destiny in the middle world."

Among the Karo and the Toba there are sometimes widely diverging versions of where the tendi dwells and how many tendi there are. According to the Toba a person has seven tendi. The second tendi is found in the placenta and amniotic fluid of the new-born baby, and accordingly the afterbirth is given special attention after the birth of a child. It is usually buried under the house, is called saudara (brother) and is regarded as the person's guardian spirit. Similar ideas about the afterbirth are also found among the Karo, who also bury the placenta and amniotic fluid under the house and regard them as two guardian spirits (kaka and agi) who always remain close to the person.

All Batak regard the loss of tendi as signifying a great danger for "body and soul". Tendi can be separated from their owners through inattentiveness, or as a result of black magic by a datu with evil intentions. In other words, the tendi is not tied to the body; it can also live for a time outside the body. The final loss of the tendi inevitably results in death. There are a variety of ideas about where exactly in the body the tendi dwells. It is present to a particularly high degree in certain parts of the body, especially the blood, the liver, the head and the heart. Sweat too is described as rich in tendi. It is believed that illnesses are connected with the absence of tendi, and the bringing back of the tendi is a main method of healing. The Karo, for instance, have gifts, called upah tendi (upah = wage, payment, gift), which they give to their tendi so that their tendi stay with them. These gifts may consist of a knife, a gong, a particular piece of clothing, a water buffalo or a small holy place. The gifts are carefully cared for in order to keep the tendi satisfied.

Tendi love the sound of the surdam (a bamboo flute). If a tendi has abandoned the body of a patient, the playing of the surdam in the raleng tendi ritual can contribute to the tendi returning to the body of the sick person. It must be emphasized that only the datuk are in a position to interpret and influence people's tendi correctly. If their endeavors are unsuccessful, then clearly the tendi has chosen another destiny for itself.

=== Death cult ===
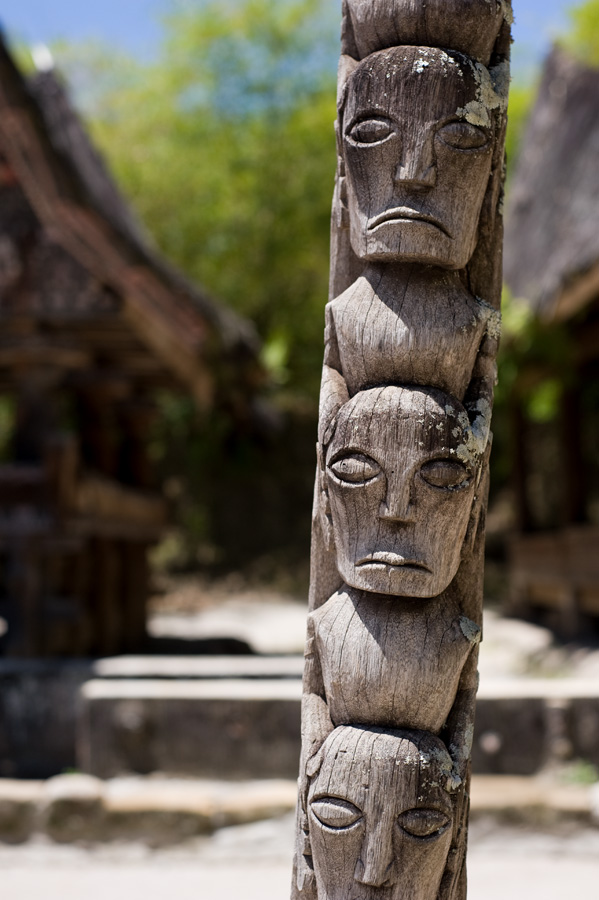
Batak Totem pole.

At death the tendi leaves the human body through the fontanelle and the "death-soul" (begu) is set free. It is thought that the tendi vanishes and after the death of any human being only the begu continues to exist. The Batak believe that the begu continue to live near their previous dwelling (in a village of the dead which is thought to be situated not far from the cemetery) and that they may contact their descendants. Bad dreams, particular misfortune and such like may be signs that the begu of an ancestor is not satisfied with the behavior of its descendants. Any individual can attempt to pacify an enraged begu by means of food and drink offerings and prayers. If this does not work, a datu or a guru must be called in. The begu are not immortal, since death also rules in the land of the dead: a begu dies seven times before it is changed into a straw and finally becomes earth.

The Batak believe that three categories of begu exist. The bicara guru are the begu of stillborn babies or of babies who have died before teething. It is possible to turn bicara guru into guardian spirits if misfortune has befallen the family of the child shortly after its death. With the help of a guru sibaso, the bicara guru can be made the family's guardian spirit for which a shrine is provided and to which sacrifices are regularly made. Once a year the bicara guru is accorded a special feast, preceded by ritual hair washing.

The begu of members of the family who have had a sudden death (mate sada-uari) can also act as guardian spirits for the family. They include the victims of accidents, suicides, murder victims, or people struck by lightning. A shrine is built where they are venerated and where sacrifices are made. A third category consists of the begu of dead virgins (tungkup). Their graves, called bata-bata or ingan tungkup, are maintained for a long time by their relatives.

=== Burial traditions ===
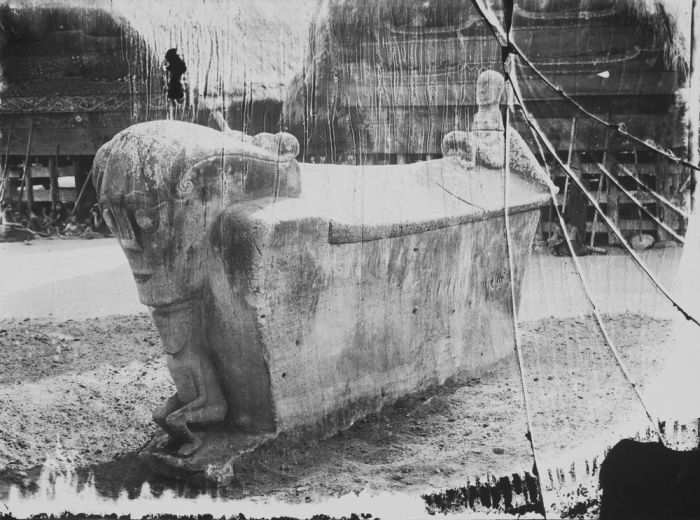
A stone sarcophagus in a Toba Batak village.

Batak burial traditions are very rich and complex. Immediately after death various ritual actions are performed to make the begu understand that from now on its world is separate from that of its kin. Symbolically this is done by reversing the mat on which the corpse is laid out so that the body lies with its head at the foot of the mat. Thumbs and toes respectively are tied together and the body is rubbed all over with camphor and its orifices stopped with camphor, then it is wrapped in a white cotton cloth. During this perumah begu ceremony a guru sibaso declares to the begu of the deceased that it is definitely dead and must take leave of its relatives.

Wealthier families have their coffins (Karo: pelangkah) made of the wood of the kemiri tree (Aleurites moluccanus), carved in the shape of a boat, its bow decorated with the carved head of a hornbill, or a horse, or a mythical beast known as a singa. The lid is then sealed with resin and the coffin may be placed in a special location near the family's house until a reburial ceremony can take place. Families that are not wealthy use simple wooden coffins or wrap the body in a straw mat.

The corpse is carried a few times round the house, usually by women, and then to the cemetery with musical accompaniment from the gondang orchestra and the continual firing of guns. At any crossroads the corpse is put down and eleven people go around it four times to confuse the begu. It is hoped that the begu will then be unable to find its way back to the village. When the funeral procession arrives at the cemetery the grave is dug and the corpse laid in it, flat on its back. Care is taken that the head lies towards the village so that, in the unexpected event that the body should get up, he or she will not be looking in the direction of the village. The bodies of datuk and those who have died from lightning are buried sitting up with their hands tied together. The palms of the hand are tied together and betel placed between them.

=== Reburial ===
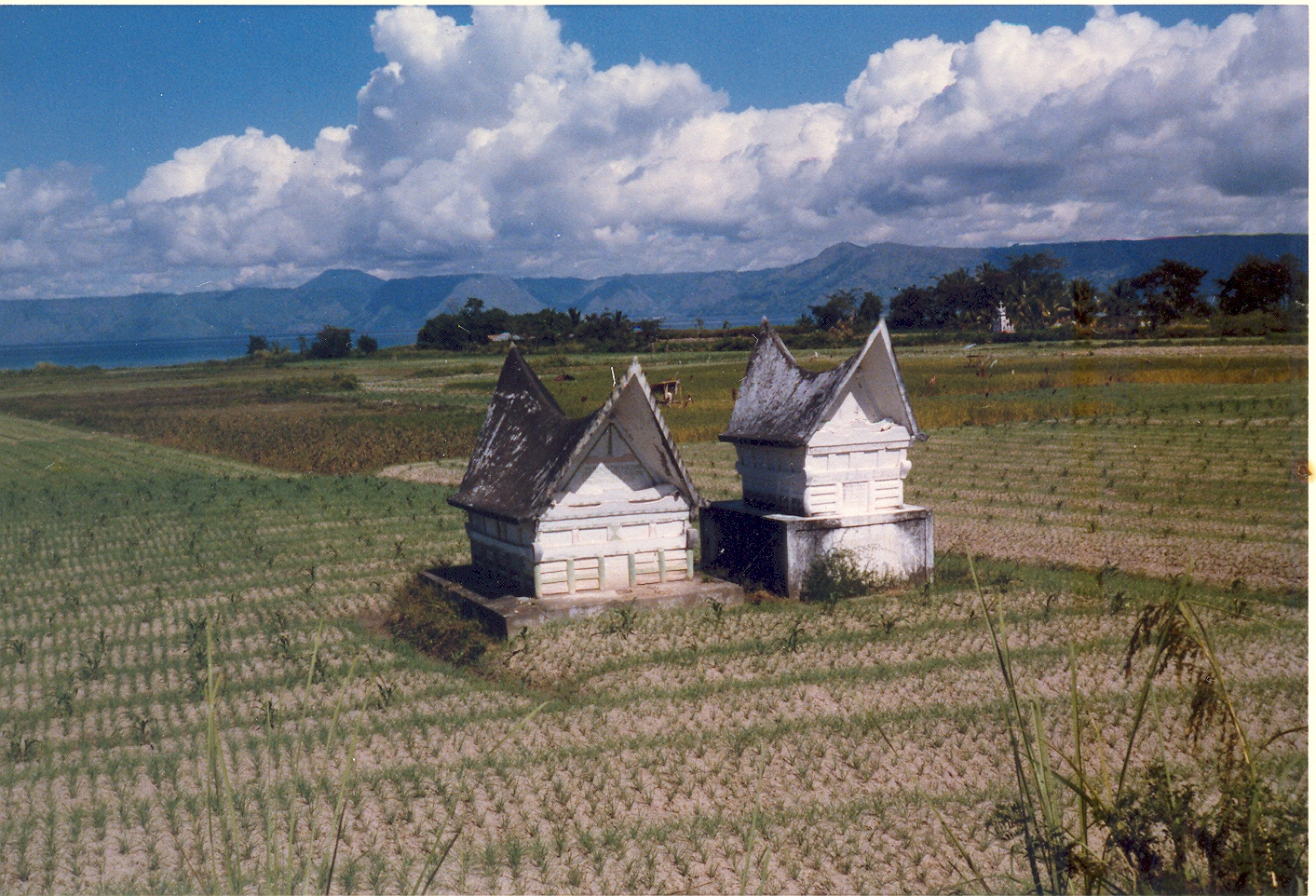
Batak tugu on the island of Samosir, Lake Toba, December 1984.

The burial tradition includes a reburial ceremony in which the bones of one's ancestors are reinterred several years after death. This secondary burial is known among the Toba Batak as mangongkal holi, among the Karo as nurun-nurun. In a ceremony lasting several days the bones of a particularly honored ancestor and those of his descendants are exhumed, cleaned, mourned and finally laid to rest again in a bone house known as a tugu or tambak:

"On the morning of the first day of the festival the graves in the cemetery are opened and the bones of the ancestors that are still there are removed. The unearthing of the skulls is presented as especially moving. The bones are collected in baskets lined with white cloth and then ritually cleaned by the women using the juice of various citrus fruits. The exhumation and cleaning of the bones is accompanied by the singing of laments. The bones are kept in the baskets in the tugu until the next morning, when the remains are wrapped in traditional cloths (ulos) and transferred from the baskets to small wooden coffins. After long speeches and a communal prayer the coffins are nailed down and placed in the chambers of the tugu. A feast consisting of meat and rice follows and traditional dances are performed."

In ancient times these sarcophagi were carved from stone or constructed from wood and later brick. Nowadays they are made of cement or concrete. Large and very ornate tugu can be seen around Lake Toba and on the island of Samosir.

One motive for the reburial ceremony appears to be to raise the status of the begu of the deceased. Traditional Batak beliefs hold that the dead occupy a hierarchical status similar to the social position they held in life. This means that a rich and powerful individual remains influential after death, and this status can be elevated if the family holds a reburial ceremony. A rich descendant can advance a begu to the status of a sumangot by means of a great ceremony and a horja feast which can last up to seven days. In antiquity a vast number of pigs, cattle or even buffalo were slaughtered at such festivals, and the gondang orchestra provided an accompaniment.

The next level up from the sumangot is the sombaon, who are the spirits of ancestors who lived ten to twelve generations ago. To raise a sumangot to a sombaon requires another great festival, a santi rea, often lasting several months, during which the inhabitants of the whole district come together. These ancestor spirits offer protection and good fortune to their descendants, but the ceremony also serves to establish new kinship groups descended from the ancestor thus honored.

=== Traditional Batak medicine ===
Madame Sitorus, a well-known Toba guru sibaso who practiced in Laguboti in 1984. She is consulting a paperback edition of the New Testament in lieu of a pustaha. On the shelf are components of herbal remedies. In front of her is a kaffir lime in a bowl of water, a form of divination used to locate lost items or people.

In traditional Batak society datuk (animist priests) as well as gurus practiced traditional medicine, although the former were exclusively male. Both professions were attributed with supernatural powers and the ability to predict the future. Treatments and healing rituals bear some resemblance to those practiced by dukuns in other parts of Indonesia. Following the Christianization of the Toba and Karo Batak in the late 19th century, missionaries discouraged traditional healing and divination and they became largely clandestine activities.

Both datu and guru healers also practiced divination by consulting a pustaha, a handwritten book made of wood and bark in which were inscribed recipes for healing remedies, incantations and songs, predictive calendars, and other notes on magic, healing and divination written in poda, an archaic Batak shorthand. According to Winkler, there were three categories of Pustaha based on the purpose of their usage:

1. Protective Magic, which includes diagnosis, therapy, medicinal mixes which have magical properties, such as amulets, parmanisan (love charms), etc.
2. Destructive Magic, which encompasses the art of making poison, the art of controlling or utilizing the power of certain spirits, calling the pangulubalang, and the art of making dorma (magical formulas for causing a person to fall in love).
3. Divination, which involves oracles (words of the gods), the wishes of the spirits, commands from the gods and from the spirits of the ancestors, and an almanac or calendrical system (porhalaan), and astrology to determine auspicious days and months to accomplish certain actions or goals.

The datu or guru consulted the pustaha when presented with a difficult problem, and in time this became in itself a ritual. When missionaries began to discourage traditional healing and augury the Bible may have been adopted by some gurus in place of the pustaha.

Among the most important healing ceremonies performed in Toba and Karo communities is that of recalling the jinujung, or personal guardian spirit. According to Toba and Karo cosmology, each person receives a jinujung in childhood or at puberty and they keep it for life unless they are unfortunate enough to lose it, in which case they will fall ill. In order to call the jinujung back, a female guru (guru sibaso in Karo) goes into a trance and the jinujung will enter into her and speak through her mouth. At this time the sick person or the family can negotiate ritual payment to entice it to return.

Traditional healers are not powerful enough to cure illness due to the loss of a person's tendi (this falls under the jurisdiction of the datuk); however, they do play a role in communicating with begu and influencing their behavior.

== Other religions ==
Religions	Total
Christianity (Protestantism & Catholicism)	4,707,658
Sunni Islam	3,738,660
Buddhism	9,190
Hinduism	1,476
Others	6,620
Overall	8,463,604

Religion of Batak people in Indonesia (2010 census)
1. Christianity (55.6%)
2. Sunni Islam (44.2%)
3. Buddhism (0.11%)
4. Hinduism (0.02%)
5. Others (0.08%)

=== Christianity ===
At the time of Marco Polo's visit in 1292 the people were described as "wild idolaters" who had not been influenced by outside religions, however by Ibn Battuta's visit in 1345 Arab traders had established river-ports along the northern coasts of Sumatra and Sultan Al-Malik Al-Dhahir had recently converted to Islam.

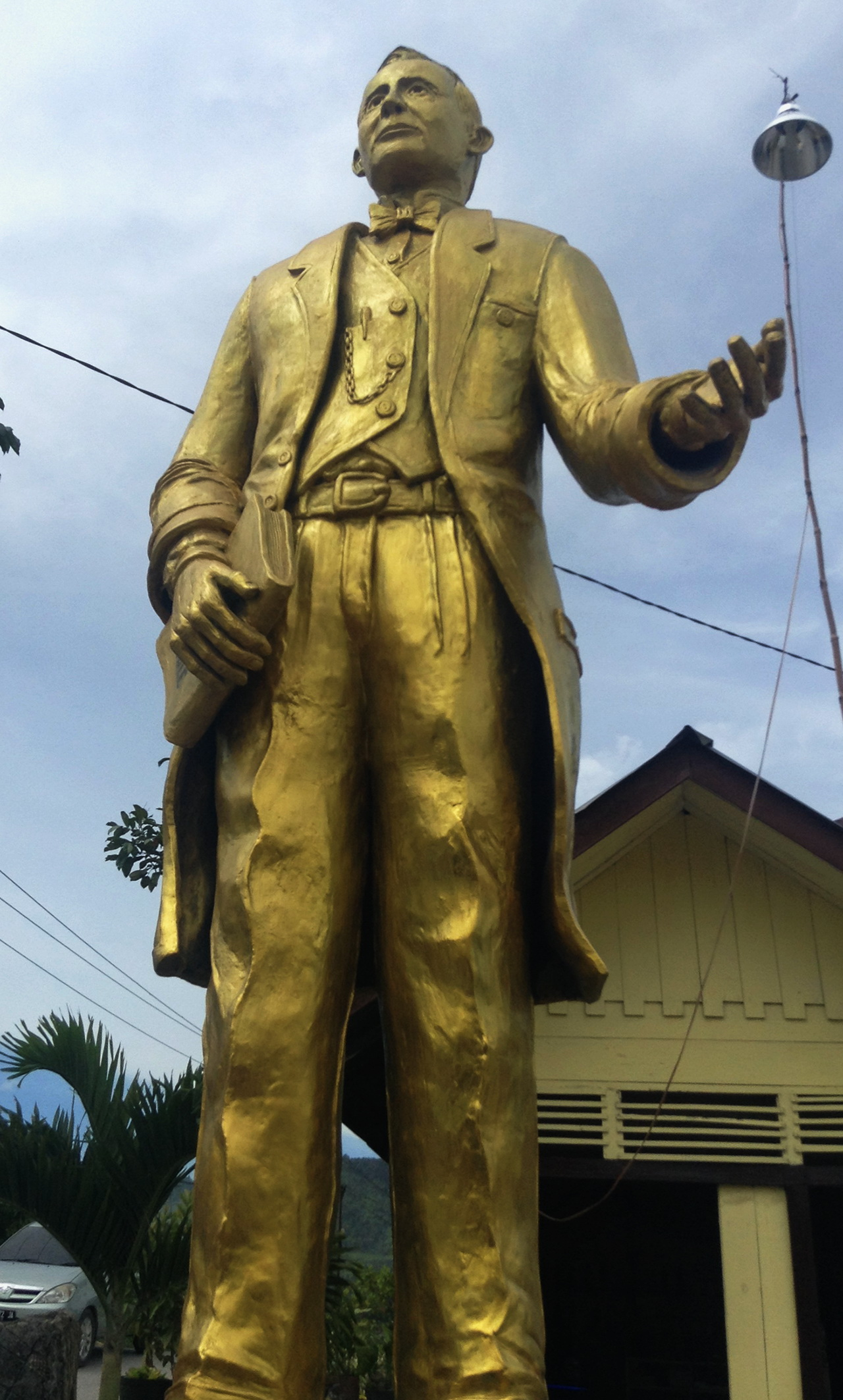
Nommensen statue in Dame Sainihuta, Tarutung, Indonesia. He was known a Protestant preacher from Germany who spread Lutheran Christianity in the land of Batak during 19th century.

Sir Stamford Raffles perceived the Batak lands as a buffer between the Islamic Aceh and Minang kingdoms, and encouraged Christian missionary work to preserve this. This policy was continued by the Dutch, who deemed the non-Muslim lands the 'Bataklanden'.

In 1824 two British Baptist missionaries, Richard Burton and Nathaniel Ward, set off on foot from Sibolga and traveled through the Batak lands. After three days' journey they reached the high valley of Silindung and spent about two weeks in the Batak region. Considering the shortness of their stay their account reveals very intensive first-hand observation. This was followed in 1834 by Henry Lyman and Samuel Munson from the American Board of Commissioners for Foreign Missions who met with a more hostile reception. According to Ida Pfeiffer:

"Some time before the arrival of the missionaries the unfortunate Americans presented themselves as religious teachers, the Battakers felt that these people were invaders, and resolving to be beforehand with their tormentors, they killed them and ate them up."

Herman Neubronner van der Tuuk was employed by the Nederlands Bijbel Genootschap (Netherlands Bible Society) in the 1850s to produce a Batak–Dutch grammar-book and a dictionary, which enabled future Dutch and German missionaries to undertake the conversion of the Toba and Simalungan Batak.

The first German missionaries to the Lake Toba region arrived in 1861, and a mission was established in 1881 by Dr. Ludwig Ingwer Nommensen of the German Rhenish Missionary Society. The New Testament was first translated into Toba Batak by Dr. Nommensen in 1869 and a translation of the Old Testament was completed by P. H. Johannsen in 1891. The complete text was printed in Latin script in Medan in 1893, although a paper describes the translation as "not easy to read, it is rigid and not fluent, and sounds strange to the Batak…[with] a number of errors in the translation."

The Toba and Karo Batak accepted Christianity rapidly and by the early 20th century it had become part of their cultural identity.

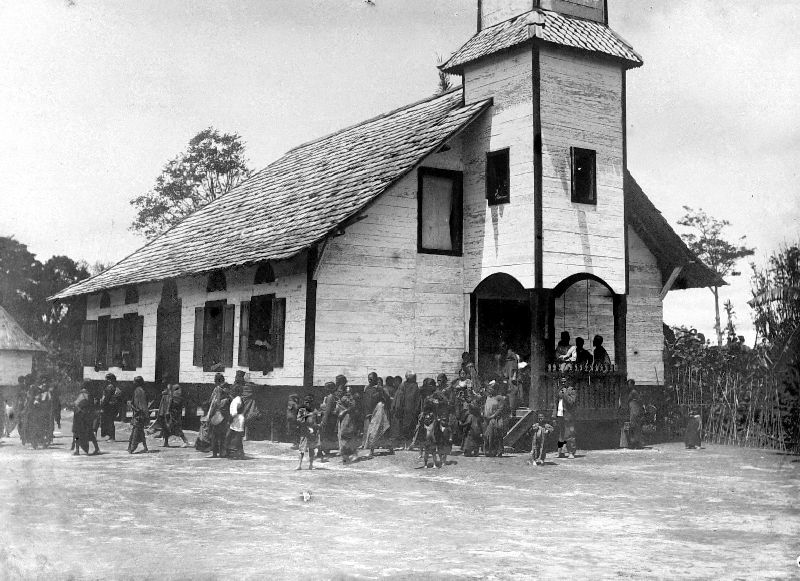
People leaving the church of the Protestant mission at Sipahutar, North Tapanauli, Indonesia

This period was characterized by the arrival of Dutch colonists and while most Batak did not oppose the Dutch, the Toba Batak fought a guerrilla war that lasted into the early 20th century and ended only with the death in 1907 of their charismatic priest-warrior-king Si Sisingamangaraja XII, who had battled the Dutch during the First Toba War with both magic and weaponry.

==== Batak churches ====
The Huria Kristen Batak Protestan (HKBP) Church was established in Balige in September, 1917. By the late 1920s a nursing school was training nurse midwives there. In 1941, the Gereja Batak Karo Protestan (GBKP) was established. Although missionaries ceded much power to Batak converts in the first decades of the 20th century, Bataks never pressured the missionaries to leave and only took control of church activities as a result of thousands of foreign missionaries being interned or forced to leave after the 1942 invasion of Sumatra by the Japanese.

The Gereja Kristen Protestan Simalungun, originally part of the HKBP and preaching in Batak Toba language, eventually became a distinctively Simalungun church, adopting Simalungun customs and language, before finally incorporating as GKPS in 1963.

=== Islam ===
The Mandailing and Angkola people, occupying the southern Batak lands, came under the influence of the neighbouring Islamic Minangkabau people as a result of the Padri War (1821–1837). Some Mandailing had previously converted to Islam, but the Padri war was a watershed event, with the Padris suppressing traditional customs (adat) and promoting 'pure' Islamic faith. Over time Mandailing Islam, has been brought closer to the predominant Southeastern Shafi`i school of Islam as a result of Mandailing discourse with other Islamic practitioners and the practice of hajj, although traditional elements remain, such as dividing inheritance among all children, a Mandailing rather than Islamic practice. Islam caused the decline in importance of marga, with many Mandailing abandoning their marga in favour of Muslim names, much less so among the Angkola to their North.

Group of Mandailing people going to perform Hajj in Mecca

The advent of Islam also caused the relegation of the datuk to a medicine man, with traditional rice-planting ceremonies and other such remnants of traditional culture deemed incompatible with Islam. The 'pasusur begu', a ceremony invoking ancestors to aid the community, was also suppressed. Other aspects of adat were however tolerated, with the Mandailing Islamic ideology placing adat on the same level as Islamic law, as in contrast with the Minang practice of placing Islamic law above adat. In more recent times, learned Islamic scholars (ulama) studying abroad, have suggested that many traditional Mandailing practices, such as the 'Raja' hereditary leaders, were in conflict with Islam, being indicative of 'pele begu'. The Islamist ulama were in conflict for authority with the Namora-Natora, the traditional village legal practitioners, who were influenced by adat as much as Islam.

Christian missionaries had been active among the northern Mandailing from 1834 onwards, but their progress was restricted by the Dutch government, who feared conflict between newly converted Christians and Muslims. In addition, the lingua franca of the government was Malay, associated with Muslims, as were government civil servants, creating the perception that Islam was the religion of modernity and progress. Missionaries determined that resistance among the Muslim Mandailing to Christianity was strong, and the missionaries abandoned them as 'unreachable people', moving north to convert the Toba.

At the turn of the 20th century, nearly all Mandailing and Angkola were Muslims. Despite this, the Dutch administration marked them as part of the Bataklanden, and therefore heathen or Christian. This perception was an inaccurate one, and many Mandailing strongly rejected the 'Batak' label. Abdullah Lubis, writing in the 1920s, claimed that while the Mandailing followed Batak marga practice, they had never followed the Batak religion, and that the Mandailing people pre-dated the Toba, having acquired marga directly from 'Hindu' visitors. In the Dutch census, the Mandailing objected strongly to being listed in the census as 'Batak Mandailing'. Mandailing in Malaysia (who migrated in the years following the Padri war), had no such objection to their being deemed 'Malays', and indeed Malaysian Mandailing retain little of their distinct identity, partly due to a British colonial policy of rice-land ownership restrictions for all but Malay-speaking Muslims, and the disapproval of 'Batak' Muslim practices by the existing Malay Muslim population.

=== Traditional Religions (Parmalim/Pemena) ===
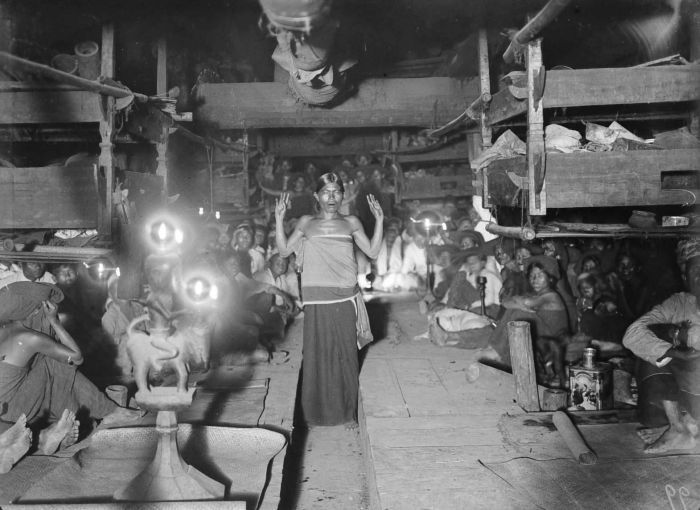
Dancing Guru sibaso (female shaman) in trance at a Perumah Bégu / House of spirit ceremony in the house of Pa Mbelgah in Kabanjahe, North Sumatera, circa 1914 and 1919

Ugamo Malim or Malim is the modern form of the Batak Toba religion. Practitioners of Malim are called Parmalim.

At the end of the 19th and in the beginning of the 20th century the Parmalim movement, which originated in Toba lands spread to other areas of the Batak lands. Especially in the lower Karo lands, the 'dusun' the Malim religion, became very influential as an expression of anti-colonial sentiments at the turn of the 20th century. Today the majority of Parmalim are Toba Batak. The largest of the several existing Parmalim groups has its centre in Huta Tinggi in the vicinity of Laguboti on the south shore of Lake Toba.

Non-Malim Batak peoples (those following Christian or Muslim faith) often continue to believe certain aspects of traditional Batak spiritual belief.

Another traditional religion of Batak is Pemena, is a tribal religion of Karo people of Indonesia. Pemena means the first or the beginning. Pemena is regarded as the first religion of Karo people. One of the doctrines of Pemena is the concept of Dibata.

The 'Perodak-odak' movement among the Karo people in the 1960s was a reassertion of the traditional Karo religion, but has largely faded; a subsequent Karo movement to identify as Hindu was noted starting from the late 1970s in order to adopt, if only in name, one of the recognised religions of Indonesia, while in practice still following traditional beliefs.

== Notable people ==
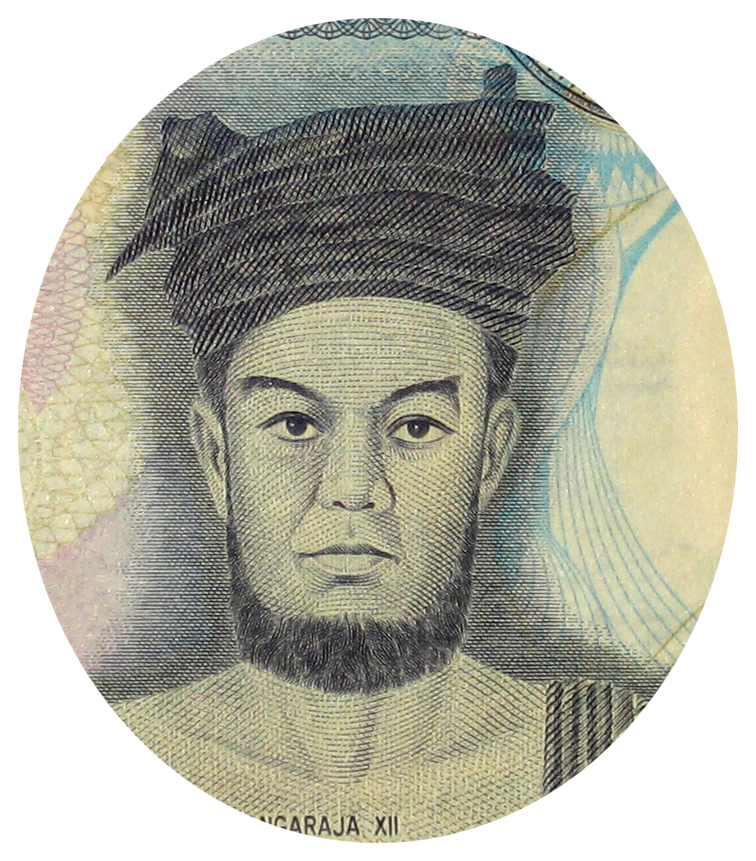
Sisingamangaraja XII, the National Hero of Indonesia

== See also ==
- Batak architecture
- Batak cuisine
- Batak mythology
- Batak script
- Batak in Singapore
- Hasapi
- Marga (Batak)
- Museum Huta Bolon Simanindo
- Naga morsarang
- Piso Halasan
- Porhalaan
- Proto-Malay
- Sigale Gale
- Tandok dance
- Tor-tor dance
- Tunggal panaluan
- Ulos
