= Tarombo =

Term for genealogy in the Batak language

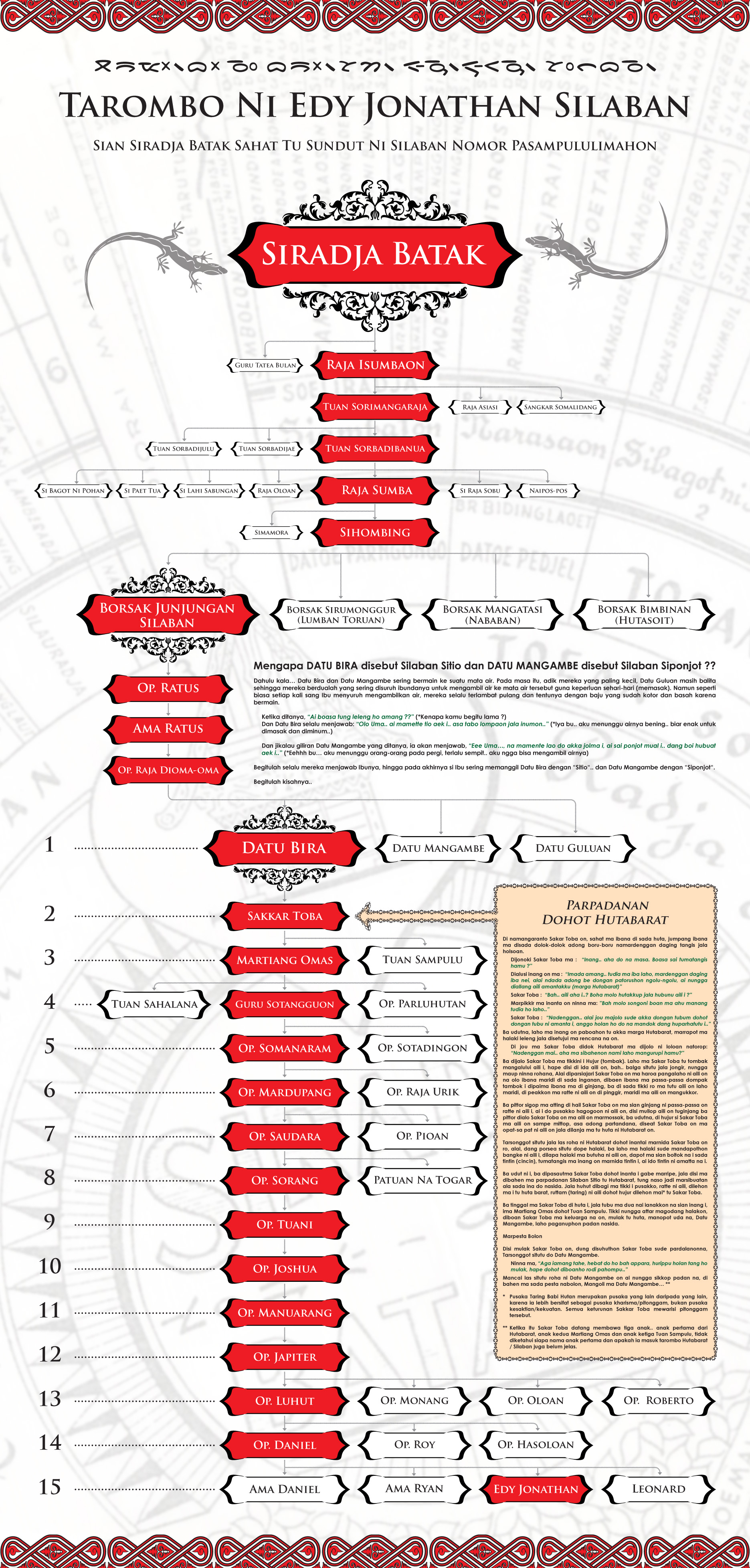
An example of Silaban family tree of the Toba Batak people.

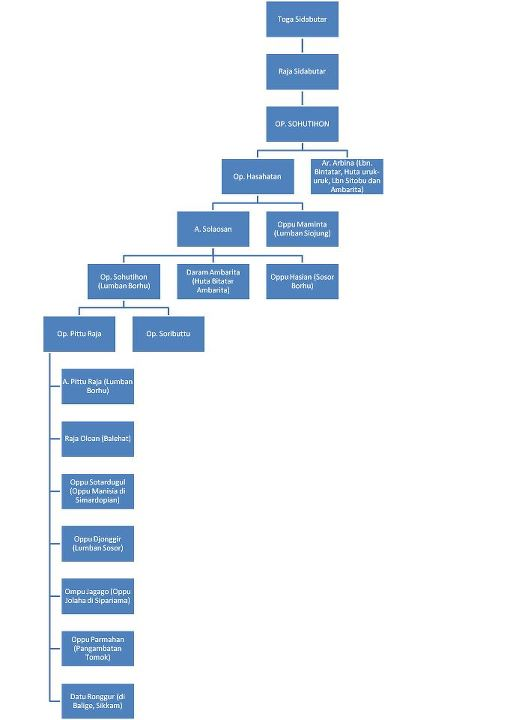
A Pitu Raja Ambarita version of Tarombo.

Tarombo is a term for genealogy in Batak culture/language. The Batak believe that they all come from the same ancestor: Si Raja Batak, the Batak patriarch. They kept the genealogy line tracing back to this ancestor, called Tarombo Batak. Its origins have been clouded with legends.
