= Pemena =

Karo traditional religion, Indonesia

- Type: Ethnic and folk religion
- Governance: National Pemena Religious Council of the Republic Indonesia
- Region: North Sumatra (Karo Regency)
- Language: Karo
- Headquarters: Kabanjahe (possibility)
- Territory: Karo Highlands
- Founder: Karo
- Recognition: Officially recognized by Indonesian government
- Members: Karo

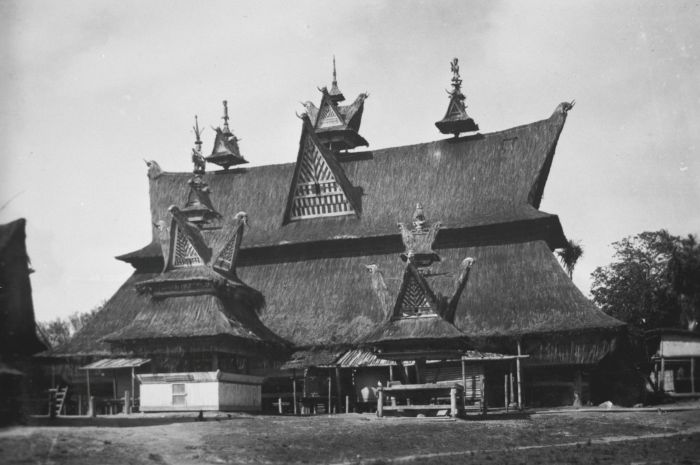
Many geriten on top of this Karo housing complex served as a kind of finials in Kabanjahe, North Sumatra.

Pemena is a tribal religion of the Karo people of Indonesia. Pemena means the first or the beginning. Pemena is regarded as the first religion of the Karo people. One of the doctrines of Pemena is the concept of Dibata.

== See also ==
- Parmalim
