= Batak mythology =

Mythological beliefs

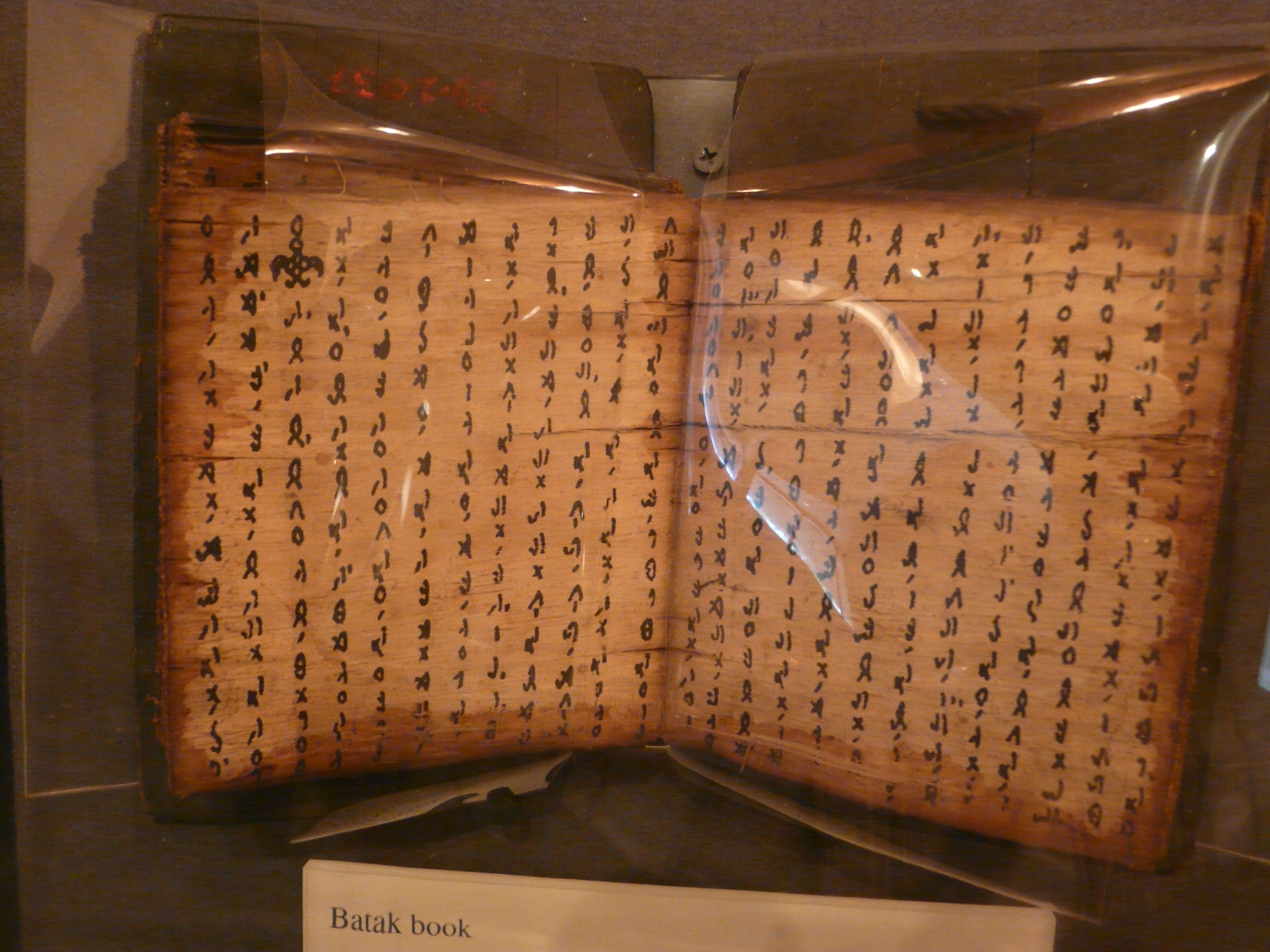
Batak book (pustaha) in the Robert C. Williams Museum of Papermaking, concerning the art of divination from a chicken.

Batak mythology is the original belief that was once adopted by the Batak people of North Sumatra, Indonesia, namely before the arrival of Protestant, Catholic, or Islamic religions. There are various tarombo (ancestor myth) versions written on pustaha (ancient books) which historians study, but generally refer to the figures below.

In this belief, the highest god who made the universe and everything in it was Debata (Ompung) Mulajadi na Bolon, who reigned in the sky. Apart from being the ruler of the upper world, Debata Mulajadi na Bolon was also the ruler of the middle world, and the underworld of the spirits, but there he was called by other names. As the ruler of the middle world, he was called Silaon na Bolon, and as the ruler of the world of the spirits, he was called Pane na Bolon. The first creation of Debata Mulajadi na Bolon was Manukmanuk Hulambujati, a magical chicken with an iron-beaked and shinny braceleted-claws. Manukmanuk Hulambujati then laid three eggs, each egg gave rise to gods named Debata Batara Guru, Debata Sorisohaliapan, and Debata Balabulan, who were then summoned together as Debata na Tolu.

Si Boru Deak Parujar, the daughter of Debata Batara Guru, was the first heavenly creature that descended to earth, namely in a mountain called Pusuk Buhit. On earth, Si Boru Deak Parujar married Raja Odapodap, which also came from one of Manukmanuk Hulambujati later eggs. Their first child was shaped round like an egg, not similar at all to humans, then Debata Mulajadi na Bolon told them to bury it, where out of it came plants that spread on the surface of the earth. Therefore, the plants were seen as the older sibling of humans in the Batak myth. Next, male–female twins were born, called Raja Ihat Manisia and Boru Ihat Manisia.

After Raja Ihat Manisia and Boru Ihat Manisia became adults, the two then got married and gave rise to all other humans, including the eponymous ancestor of the Batak people named Si Raja Batak. Si Boru Deak Parujar and Raja Odapodap then returned to the sky after their two children got married, and since then the connection between heaven and earth has been broken off, unlike before.

== See also ==
- Batak
- Mythology of Indonesia
- Parmalim
