= Singa (mythology) =

Figure from the mythology of the Batak people of North Sumatra

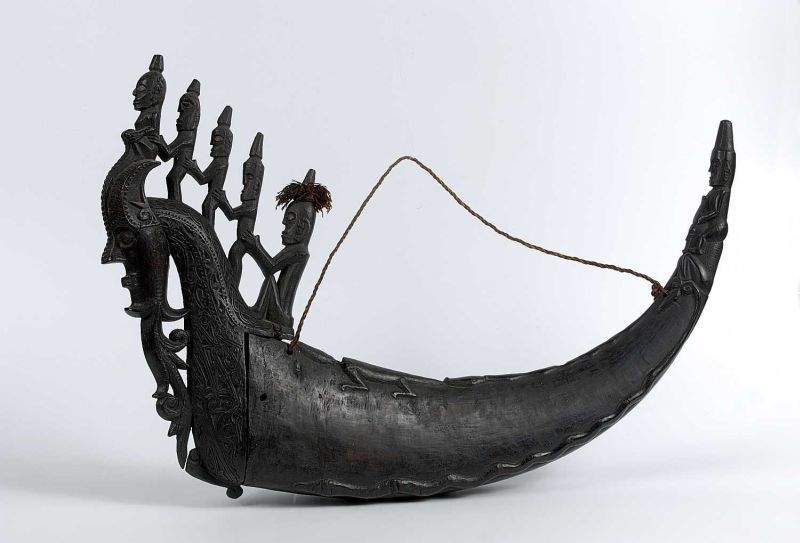
A pupuk (magical substance) container, attribute of a datu (Batak medicine man), is often carved with an image of the singa, sometimes with other figures mounting on it.

Singa is an apotropaic figure from the mythology of the Batak people of North Sumatra, Indonesia. The singa represents a benevolent and protective power. The singa is described as "part human, part water buffalo, and part crocodile or lizard". It is variedly represented, but always has an elongated face, with big bulging eyes, a well-defined nose, and long spiraling beard. It is often represented only with its head, but sometimes it may also be represented full body. Other figures - such as other protective deity or ancestral figures - may also be represented standing or sitting on top of the head of the singa.

== Etymology ==
The word singa is derived from the Sanskrit singa, "lion". The Batak term singa has a predominantly magical - rather than zoological - meaning, so it does not symbolize a lion, but Nāga or Boru Saniang Naga, the primeval water serpent from the Hindu-Buddhist mythology. It is not fully understood why the name singa is attributed to this figure.

== As ornaments ==
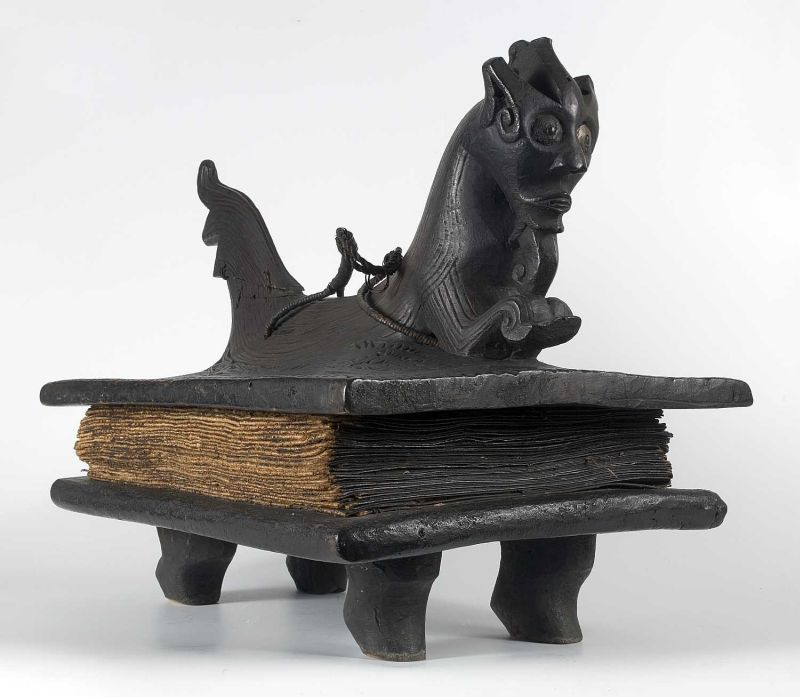
A figure of singa as parchment holder.

Images of singa are carved in various objects such as domestic utensils, medicine containers, jewelries, amulets, wood coffins, stone sarcophagi, barns, and Batak traditional houses. Its frequent use made the singa a symbol of the Batak culture. Carving of singa on a Batak house is called singa ni ruma, or "singa of the house".

The apotropaic use of a singa may stem from the Hindu-Buddhism period of Batak during the ninth century (the Batak people are predominantly Christian or Muslim community). One of the major features of Hindu-Buddhist architecture in Java and Bali is the ubiquitous kirtimukha over arches and doorways. It was during the period of the Aparajita style at the beginning of the ninth century, that these Batak version of kirtimukha - called singhamugam - appeared in full relief.

== See also ==
- Batak
- Architecture of Sumatra
- Culture of Indonesia
