= Pustaha =

Batak Magical book

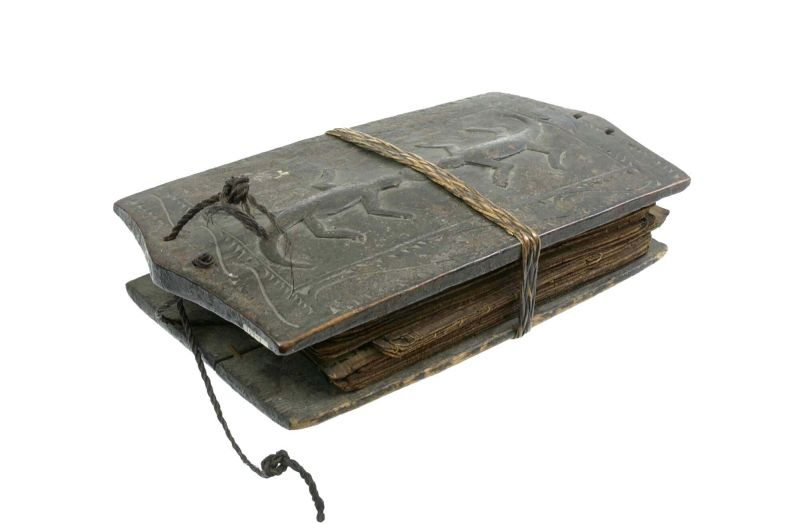
A pustaha, or the Batak divination book, with its cover carved with images of Boraspati.

A pustaha (Batak script: ᯇᯮᯘ᯲ᯖᯂ) is a Batak-culture grimoire from North Sumatra, containing magical formulas, divinations, recipes, and laws. The pustaha is written and compiled by a datu, or magician-priest.

== Etymology ==
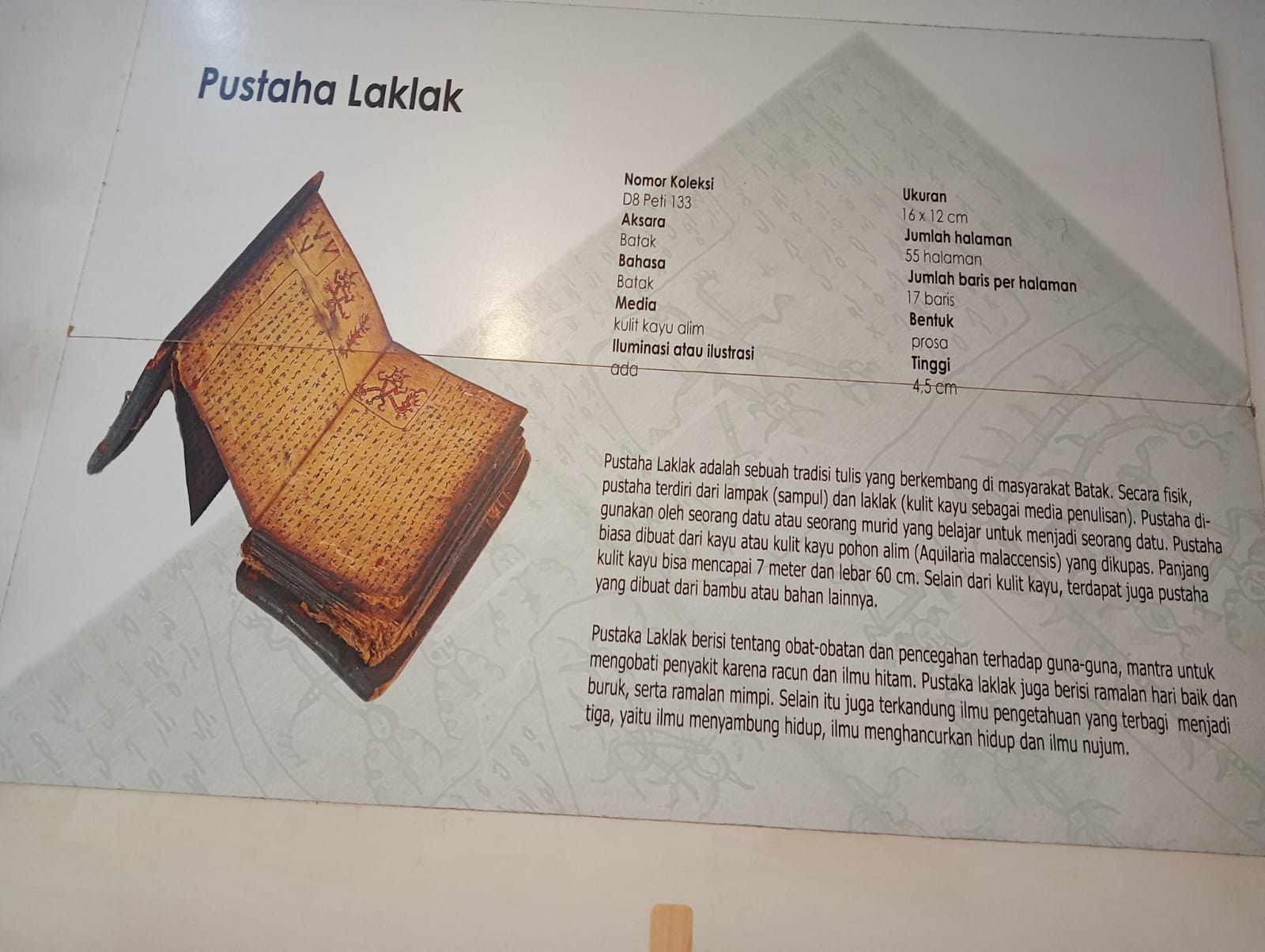
Batak Pustaha / Laklak collections at National Library of Indonesia on Medan Merdeka Selatan street, Jakarta

The name pustaha is borrowed from the Sanskrit word pustaka (Sanskrit पुस्तक) meaning "book" or "manuscript". This indicates an earlier influence of Hinduism on the culture of Batak.

== Form and material ==
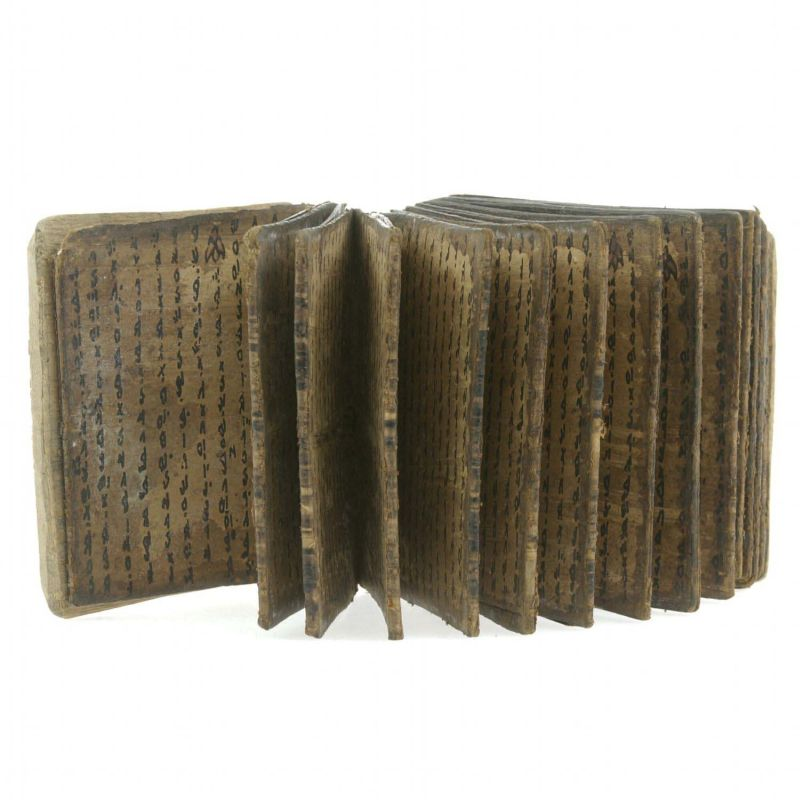
The content of a pustaha.

Physically, a pustaha consists of two hardcovers (lampak) and pages made of softened tree bark (laklak) for the writings. The hardcover is usually carved with motifs of an ilik, a gecko which represents the deity Boraspati ni Tano, a beneficial earth deity of the Toba Batak people. The pages are made of the bark of the alim tree or the agarwood (Aquilaria malaccensis). The bark is softened in rice water, folded and secured between the two hardcovers. Alim tree can be found growing in the region of Barus Hulu, around Pardomuan in Dairi Regency, and on Pulau Raja in Asahan Regency. Some pustahas are made of bamboo or bone of a buffalo.

The length of the tree bark usually reaches 7 metres (23 ft) long and 60 centimetres (24 in) wide. A pustaha that is displayed in the library of the Leiden University has a length of 15 metres (49 ft), while the largest pustaha displayed in the Amsterdam Tropenmuseum reaches 17 metres (56 ft).

== Rituals ==
A pustaha is written and composed by a Toba magician-priest, known as the datu (or sometimes the guru). A datu wrote the pustaha in Batak script using an ancient language style known as the hata poda. The word poda (or pědah in northern dialect) is an everyday Batak word meaning "advise", but in a pustaha, this word means "instruction" or "guide". The hata poda originates from the southern part of the Batak land with some Malay word additions. The pustaha is used by the datu as a reference for him and for his students for all kind of information related to magic, rituals, prescriptions, and divination. The pustaha is one of many magical instruments owned by a datu, the other are staffs that can assure good luck or cause illness, medicine horns, bamboo calendars and datu knives.

== Magic knowledge ==
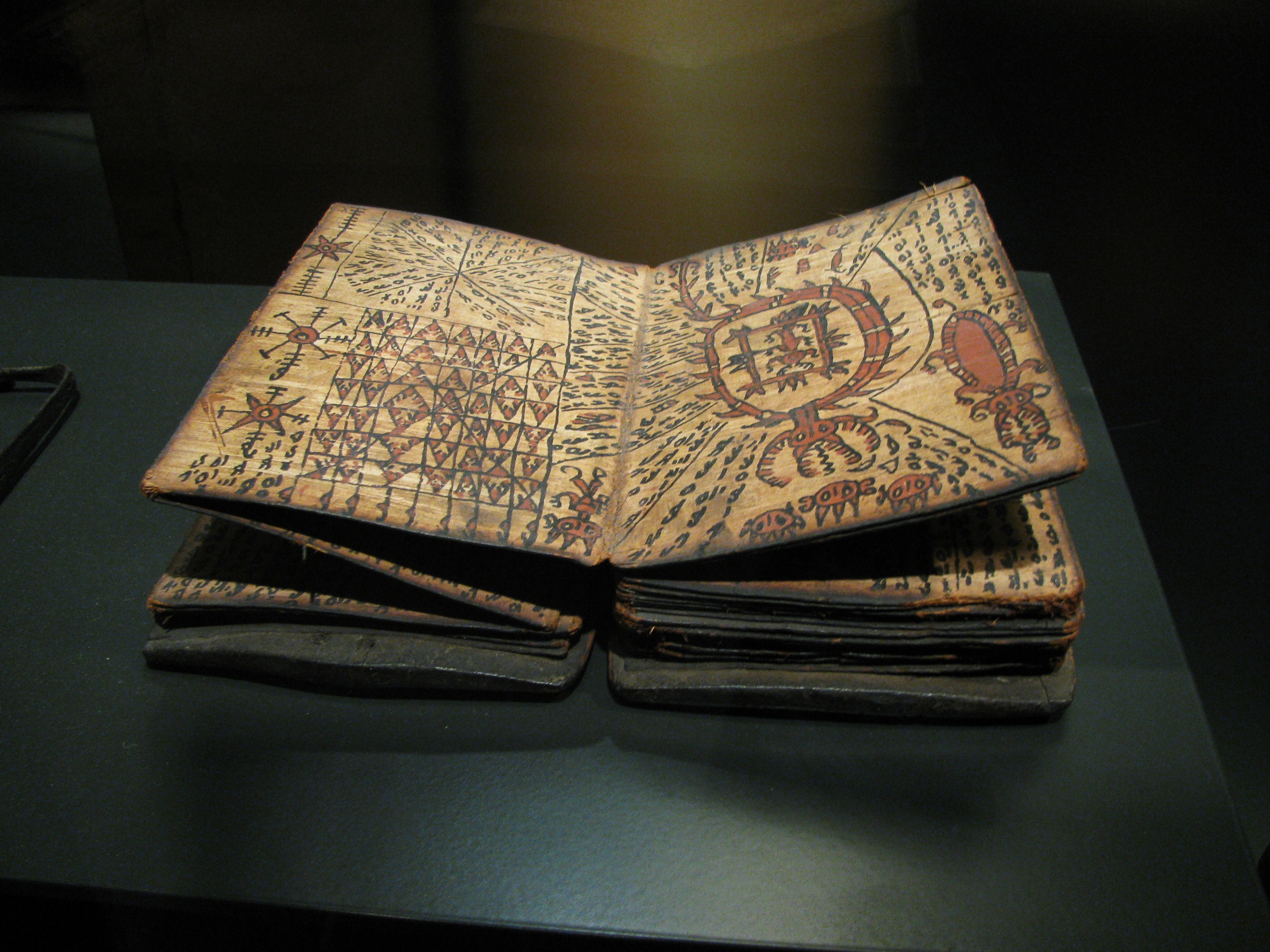
Magical diagrams in the page of a pustaha kept in the Leiden Museum of Ethnology.

The magic knowledge contained in a pustaha is known as the hadatuon ("knowledge of the datu"). Johannes Winkler (1874–1958), a Dutch doctor who was sent to Toba in 1901 and learned the pustaha from a datu named Ama Batuholing Lumbangaol, created a comprehensive study on the content of pustaha. The result of his study divided the content of the pustaha into three types of main knowledge: the art to sustain life (white magic), the art to destroy life (black magic), and the art of divination.

The art of sustaining life or white magic is one of the main content of pustaha. Some examples of white magic knowledge in a pustaha are the art of potion-making designed to protect the drinker from illness and curses; methods to create protective magical amulet; recipes for household medicine; and charms.

The art of destroying life or black magic is another frequent content of pustaha. Black magic knowledge in pustaha includes ways to attack, inflict damage or kill enemies. Examples can be quite gruesome; one example involves the kidnapping, rearing, and killing of a child by means of pouring boiling tin into the mouth; afterwards the body is chopped and mixed with other animals, left to putrefy and then the liquid oozing from the mixture is collected as ingredient that would be used to invoke the spirit (begu) of the murdered child, which now acted as a pangulubalang, a kind of spirit that can be controlled by the datu to destroy enemies or other rivaling spirits. Another example of black magic is a poison called gadam which can cause the skin of the drinker to become "scaly like the victim of a leper".

The art of divination involves astrology, e.g. knowledge on auspicious or inauspicious days on the calendar. Astrology in pustaha is heavily influenced by Hinduism and contains knowledge of the zodiac, of the eight cardinal directions, days of the week, and hours of the day. This knowledge is known as the porhalaan, or the Batak calendar, which is curiously not used as a proper calendar, but only used to determine auspicious or inauspicious days of the calendar.

Modern pustaha may contain folklores, although this is rare and not considered an authentic content of pustaha. A number of pustaha in the collection owned by van der Tuuk and Ophuijsen contain folklores because the Dutch men asked the datu to write Batak folklores in the pustaha.

== Notable pustahas ==
Below are list of notable pustaha.

- The Great Pustaha, Tropenmuseum, Amsterdam. Probably the largest pustaha ever recorded.
- Pustaha 4301, Logan Museum of Anthropology, Beloit, Wisconsin
- Pustaha poda ni si aji mamis ("instruction to destroy enemies"), Übersee-Museum, Bremen.
- Pustaha Laklak D 53, National Library of Indonesia
- Pustaha karo batak group – Bakara village Museu d'Etnología i de les Cultures, Barcelona.

== Cited works ==
- Kozok, Uli (2009). Surat Batak: sejarah perkembangan tulisan Batak : berikut pedoman menulis aksara Batak dan cap Si Singamangaraja XII (PDF) (in Indonesian). École française d'Extrême-Orient. ISBN 9789799101532.
- Teygeler, René (1993). Pustaha - A study into the production process of the Batak bark book. Leiden: KITLV.
- Westerkamp, Willem (2009). "FROM SINGA TO NAGA PADOHA, THE MAKING OF A MAGICAL CREATURE". Indonesia and the Malay World. 37 (108). doi:10.1080/13639810902979354.
