= Noha Simangunsong =

Indonesian-born Finnish footballer (born 2010)

Personal information
- Full name: Noha Pohan Simangunsong
- Date of birth: 12 March 2010 (age 16)
- Place of birth: Jakarta, Indonesia
- Height: 1.72 m (5 ft 8 in)
- Position: Midfielder

Team information
- Current team: NAC Breda (youth)

Youth career
- NAC Breda

International career^{‡}
Years	Team	Apps	(Gls)
2025	Finland U15	1	(0)
2025–2026	Indonesia U17	6	(0)
2026–	Finland U17	0	(0)
- ‡ National team caps and goals as of 5 October 2026

Noha Pohan Simangunsong (born 12 March 2010), commonly known as Noha, is an Indonesian-born Finnish professional footballer who plays as a midfielder for the youth academy of Eredivisie club NAC Breda. Born in Indonesia, he has represented both Finland and Indonesia at youth international levels.

== Early life ==
Noha was born in Jakarta, Indonesia. His father is an Indonesian of Toba Batak descent with the surname Simangunsong who comes from Balige in Toba Regency, North Sumatra, while his mother is from Finland. Due to his lineage, he holds dual citizenship.

== Club career ==
Noha developed his early footballing career in the Netherlands, joining the youth academy system of NAC Breda. He progressed through their junior ranks, playing primarily as a central or defensive midfielder for the club's under-15 and under-16 squads.

== International career ==
Noha initially represented the Finland U15 squad, earning caps during friendly matches in February 2025.

Later in 2025, he was scouted by the Football Association of Indonesia (PSSI) to join the Indonesia U17 team. He made three appearances during the 2025 Independence Cup (Indonesian: Piala Kemerdekaan 2025) held in Medan. He was subsequently selected for the Indonesian squad at the 2026 AFC U-17 Asian Cup in Qatar, where he featured in three group stage matches against China, Qatar, and Japan.

On 30 September 2026, FIFA officially approved Noha's formal change of association request, permanently switching his international allegiance back to Finland.
