= Tampubolon =

Batak surname originating in Indonesia

Tampubolon or Tampoebolon (Toba Batak: ᯖᯔ᯲ᯇᯮᯅᯬᯞᯬᯉ᯲) is a Toba Batak clan or family name (marga) originating in Balige, North Sumatra, Indonesia.

Notable people with the family name include:

- Bara Tampubolon (born 1985), Indonesian entrepreneur and actor
- Juan Felix Tampubolon (born 1956), Indonesian lawyer
- Maruli Tampubolon (born 1987), Indonesian singer and actor
- Sondang Tiar Debora Tampubolon (born 1983), Indonesian politician, member of the House of Representatives
- Tumpal Tampubolon (born 1979), Indonesian film director, screenwriter, actor
