= Tandok dance =

Indonesian traditional dance

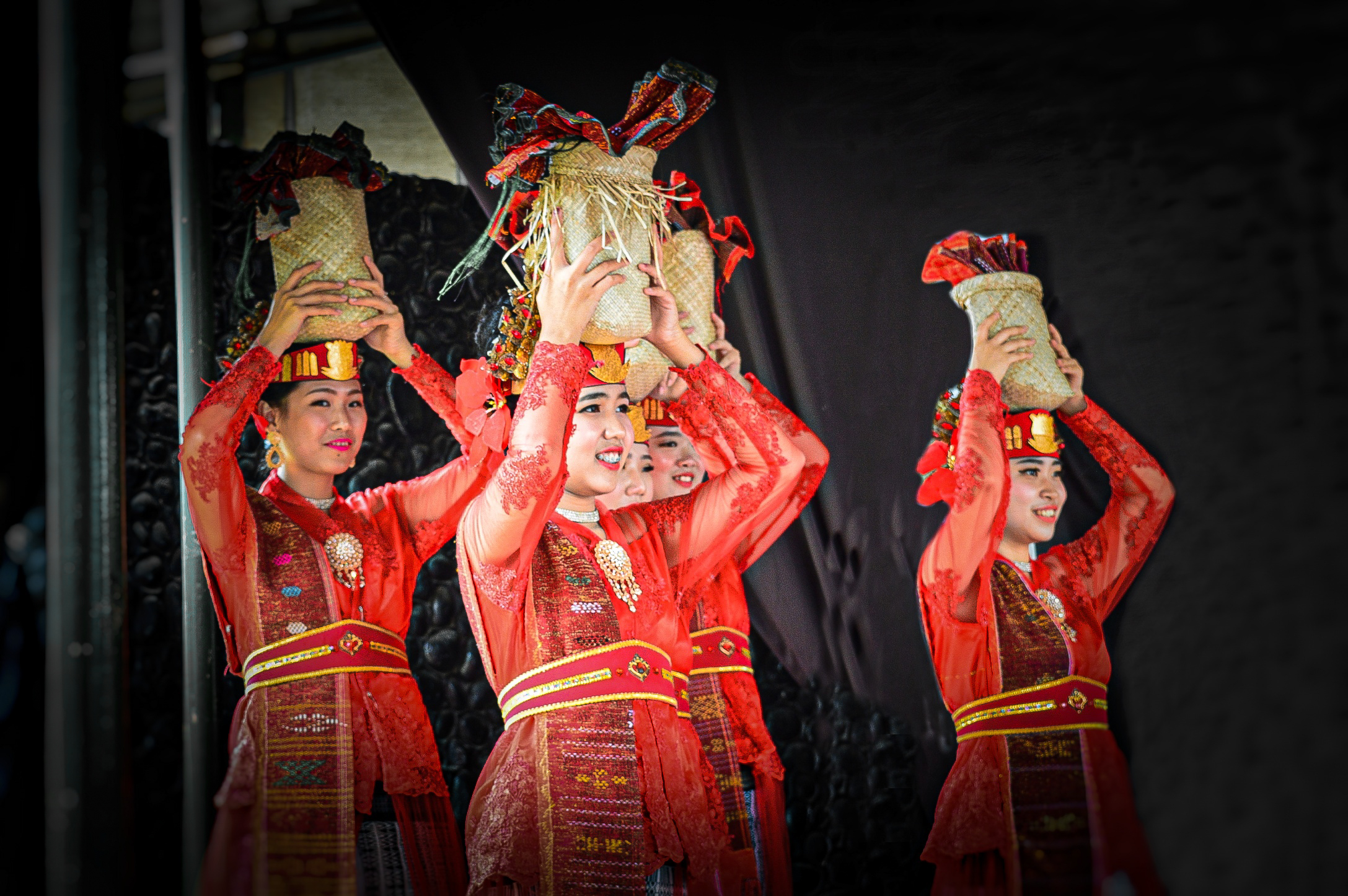
- Tandok dance performance
- Native name: ᯖᯢ᯲oᯃ᯲ (Batak); Tari Tandok (Indonesian)
- Genre: Traditional dance
- Inventor: Batak
- Origin: Indonesia

Tandok dance (Batak: ᯖᯢ᯲oᯃ᯲) is a traditional Batak dance originating from the North Sumatra, Indonesia. This dance tells about the activities of harvesting rice using tandok carried out by mothers in the fields. In addition, this dance also contains the importance of family values between each other.

== Form and movement ==
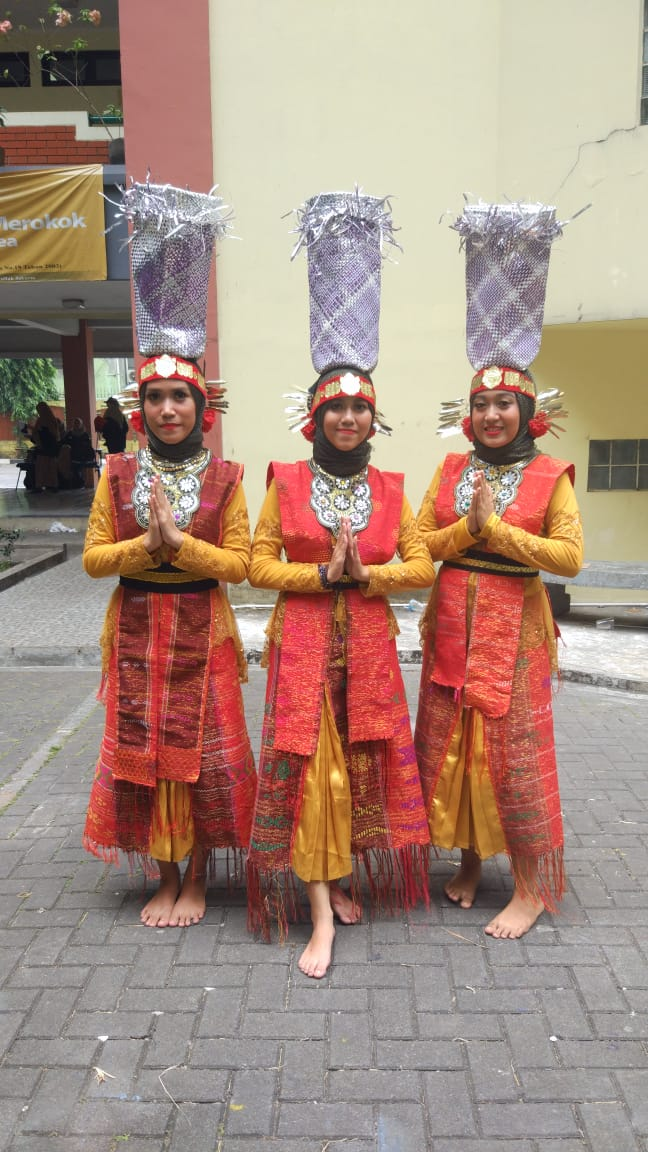
Tandok dancers in traditional batak clothes with the dominance of red and black cloth

Tandok dancers are generally women who wear traditional Batak clothes, which are dominated by black and red. The dance properties used include tandok, ulos, and sarong. The Tandok dance is usually danced by four dancers, but this does not become a standard. It can also be performed by an even number of dancers more than four.

This traditional dance is accompanied by Gondang music. Similar to gamelan in Java and Bali, Gondang is also an ensemble musical instrument that has variations. If the Javanese gamelan and the variations in the music produced are based on the skill of the salendro players, the variations on the Gondang are on the Sarune and Taganing players.

The Tandok dance movement is dominated by hand movements. In certain parts the dancers then form a new formation with the Tandok in the middle. The movement illustrates the atmosphere of gathering in a container that is usually done by mothers in the fields. The Tandok dance movement in general also describes the Tor Tor movement that mothers do every time there is a party and celebration, while using the tandok as a head covering.

== Meaning ==
Tandok dance has a deep message about the close family ties in the Batak land. In addition, the Tandok dance also depicts the Batak people who have always lived as an agrarian nation, a nation that is closely related to planting culture and respecting nature such as respecting their ancestors.

== See also ==
- Si gale gale
- Tor-tor dance
- Dance in Indonesia
