= Sigalegalephrynus =

Scientific classification
- Kingdom: Animalia
- Phylum: Chordata
- Class: Amphibia
- Order: Anura
- Family: Bufonidae
- Genus: Sigalegalephrynus; Smart, Sarker, Arifin, Harvey, Sidik, Hamidy, Kurniawan & Smith, 2017

Species
- See text

Genus of amphibians

Sigalegalephrynus is a genus of toads in the family Bufonidae. Species are commonly known as puppet toads.

They are endemic to the mountains of Sumatra in Indonesia. They have both arboreal and troglodytic habits, being known from trees and rock hollows in montane habitats, including stratovolcanoes such as Sorikmarapi and Mount Kunyit. The genus is named after the si gale-gale, life-sized wooden puppets created by the indigenous Toba Batak people, referencing their relatively large size, lanky build, long arms, and wood-brown coloration.

The genus and its first two species were only described in 2017 (with the first individuals only discovered in 2014), with three more described in 2019. All species are microendemic to their localities and are threatened by habitat loss, and it has thus been recommended that all be classified as Endangered on the IUCN Red List.

The following species are known:

Binomial name and author	Common name
Sigalegalephrynus burnitelongensis Sarker, Wostl, Thammachoti, Sidik, Hamidy, Kurniawan, and Smith, 2019	Burning Mountain puppet toad
Sigalegalephrynus gayoluesensis Sarker, Wostl, Thammachoti, Sidik, Hamidy, Kurniawan, and Smith, 2019	Gayo Lues Highland's puppet toad
Sigalegalephrynus harveyi Sarker, Wostl, Thammachoti, Sidik, Hamidy, Kurniawan, and Smith, 2019	Harvey's puppet toad
Sigalegalephrynus mandailinguensis Smart, Sarker, Arifin, Harvey, Sidik, Hamidy, Kurniawan, and Smith, 2017	Mandailing puppet toad
Sigalegalephrynus minangkabauensis Smart, Sarker, Arifin, Harvey, Sidik, Hamidy, Kurniawan, and Smith, 2017	Minangkabau puppet toad
