= Toba Batak people =

Group of the Batak people in Indonesia

ᯅᯖᯂ᯲ ᯖᯬᯅ (Batak Toba)
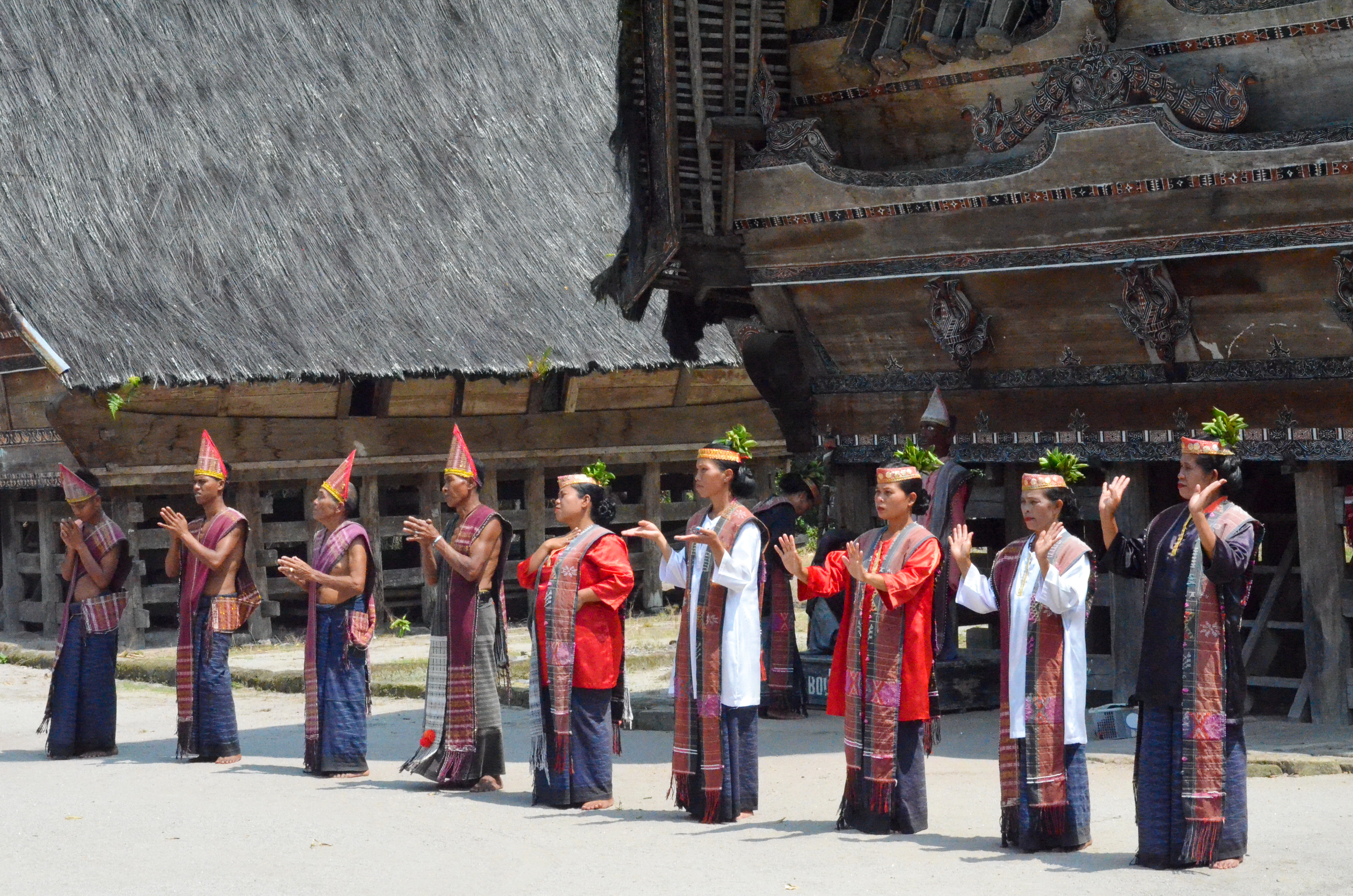
- Toba Batak men and women performing the Tortor dance

Total population
- c. 4,000,000 (2026)

Regions with significant populations
- Indonesia: North Sumatra: Toba Samosir Regency, Samosir Regency, Humbang Hasundutan Regency, Sidikalang, Sibolga, Pematang Siantar, Medan, Dairi, Deli Serdang, and the surrounding areas – 3,000,000 Outside North Sumatra: Riau, Batam, Jakarta, Java, Kalimantan, Sulawesi, Papua, Bali, and around Indonesia – 1,100,000 Outside Indonesia: Singapore Malaysia United States European Union Australia Canada United Kingdom New Zealand – 1,100+

Languages
- Toba Batak (incl. Pardembanan), Indonesian

Religion
- Predominantly; Christianity 98% Minority: Islam 1.7%, Parmalim and other traditional religions 0.3%

Related ethnic groups
- Angkola people, Karo people, Mandailing people, Pakpak people, Simalungun people

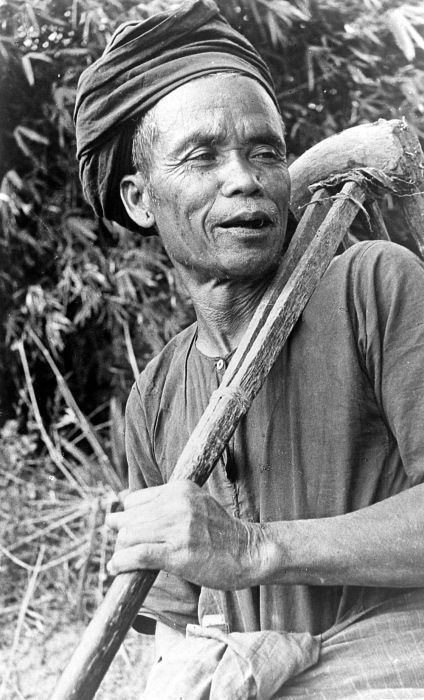
A Batak Toba man from Samosir with a hoe over his shoulders, pre-1939.

The Toba (also known as Toba Batak) people (Batak Toba: ᯅᯖᯂ᯲ ᯖᯬᯅ) are one of the sub-ethnic groups of the Batak people, found mainly in North Sumatra, Indonesia. The general term "Batak" is sometimes used to refer to the Batak Toba people, for one thing because the Toba people are the largest sub-group of the Batak ethnicity, for another because they tend to self-identify as merely Batak instead of "Toba" or "Toba Batak", contrary to the habit of the Mandailing, Angkola, Karo, Simalungun and Pakpak communities who commonly self-identify with their respective sub-groups. Religiously, they predominantly adhere to Protestant Christianity.

The Toba people are found in Toba Regency, Humbang Hasundutan Regency, Samosir Regency, North Tapanuli Regency, Central Tapanuli Regency (with Sibolga and its surrounding regions), and part of Dairi Regency. The Batak Toba people speak the Toba Batak language and are centered on Lake Toba and Samosir Island within the lake. Batak Toba people frequently build in traditional Batak architecture styles which are common in Samosir. Cultural demonstrations, performances, and festivities such as Sigale Gale are often held for tourists.

Paleontological research done in the Humbang region of the west side of Toba Lake suggests that human activity existed 6,500 years ago. The genetic test of the Toba Batak people shows that the Toba Batak are the descendants of different people with distinct genetic components. As Austronesians, the Toba Batak's ancestors had migrated from Taiwan to Sumatra thousands of years ago.

== History ==
=== Batak kingdoms ===
The seal of the Sisingamangaraja dynasty.

There were numerous kingdoms and dynasties in the history of the Batak and Toba Batak people. The last dynasty in the Toba Batak people is the Sisingamangaraja dynasty with twelve successive priest kings called ‘Sisingamangaraja’ from the Sinambela clan. During the time when the Batak kingdom was based in Bakara, the Sisingamangaraja dynasty of the Batak kingdom divided their kingdom into four regions by the name of Raja Maropat, which are:

- Raja Maropat Silindung
- Raja Maropat Samosir
- Raja Maropat Humbang
- Raja Maropat Toba

=== Dutch colonization ===
The Dutch colonization started with the defeat of King Sisingamangaraja XII, ending the Thirty years Batak War. The Dutch colonization formally began with the annexation of the Onafhankelijke Batak-Landen or ‘The Free Batak-Country’ into The Dutch East Indies and the formation of the Tapanuli Residency in 1910. The Tapanuli Residency is divided into four regions that are called afdeling (Dutch for "section"); today it is known as a regency or city, namely:

- Afdeling Padang Sidempuan, which later became South Tapanuli Regency, Mandailing Natal Regency, Padang Lawas Regency, North Padang Lawas Regency and Padang Sidempuan.
- Afdeling Nias, which later became Nias Regency and South Nias Regency.
- Afdeling Sibolga en Ommelanden, today it is Central Tapanuli Regency and Sibolga.
- Afdeling Bataklanden, which later became North Tapanuli Regency, Humbang Hasundutan Regency, Toba Samosir Regency, Samosir Regency, Dairi Regency and Pakpak Bharat Regency.

=== Japanese occupation ===
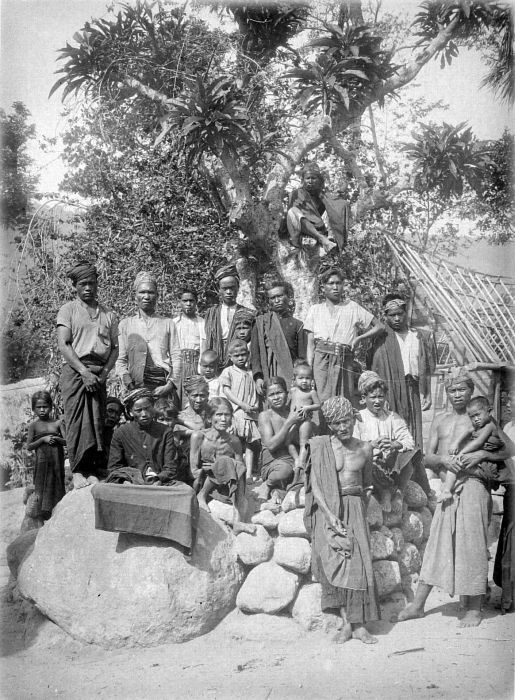
A group of Toba people, circa 1914–1919.

During the Japanese occupation of the Dutch East Indies, the administration of the Tapanuli Residency had little changes.

=== Post-independence of Indonesia ===
After the independence, the government of Indonesia retained Tapanuli as Residency. Dr. Ferdinand Lumban Tobing became the first Tapanuli Resident.

Although there were changes made to the name, the division of the region was still the same. For example, the name of Afdeling Bataklanden was changed to Luhak Tanah Batak, and the first luhak (federated region) appointed was Cornelius Sihombing; who was once also a demang (chief) silindung. The title Onderafdeling (Dutch for "subdivision") was changed to urung, and demangs that supervised an onderafdeling were promoted as kepala (head) urung. Onderdistrik (subdistrict) then became urung kecil, and was supervised by kepala urung kecil; which was previously known as assistant demang.

Just as it was in the past, the government of the Tapanuli Residency was divided into four districts, namely:

- Silindung Regency
- Samosir Regency
- Humbang Regency
- Toba Regency

=== Transfer of sovereignty in early 1950 ===
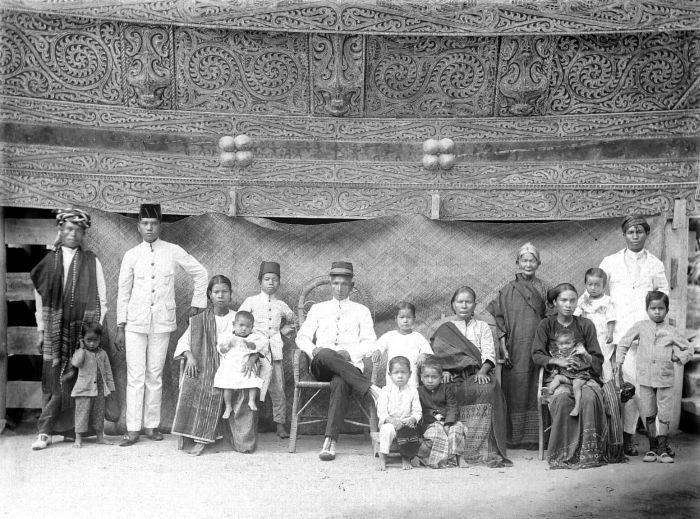
Toba heads with his family in their home with beautifully carved head of Toba family (adathuis) Tapanoeli, North Sumatra, circa 1900.

During the transfer of sovereignty in the early 1950s, the Tapanuli Residency that was unified into North Sumatra province and was divided into four new regencies, namely:

- North Tapanuli Regency (previously known as Tanah Batak Regency)
- Central Tapanuli Regency (previously known as Sibolga Regency)
- South Tapanuli Regency (previously known as Padang Sidempuan Regency)
- Nias Regency

=== Present ===
In December 2008, the Tapanuli Residency was unified under North Sumatra province. Since then, Toba is under the Toba Samosir Regency's region with Balige as its capital.

== Culture ==
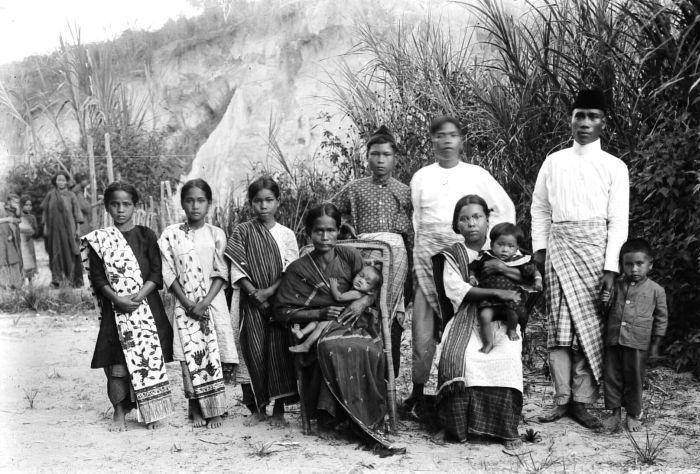
A newly converted Christian Toba family in Tapanoeli.

The Toba Batak people practice a distinct culture. The central foundation of their culture is the customs or adat called ‘Dalihan Na Tolu’ (‘The Three Legged Stove’). The Toba Batak generally are regarded as a patriarchal society. While the role of men is central in the Toba Batak society, the role of women is very crucial with the existence of the Toba Batak concept of ‘Hula hula‘ where women and their families hold a higher ground in familial relations. Since the conversion to Christianity of the Toba Batak people in the 19th century, Christianity has played a vital part in the life of Toba people with church influencing the customs and regulations of the Toba Batak life. Toba Batak's adat traditions are often present in Christian ceremonies such as baptism, confirmation, marriage, and burial, while church hymns, psalms, and prayers are often involved and invoked in traditional ethnic Toba Batak ceremonies.

The Toba Batak people are known to possess a robust tradition of Mangaranto or becoming migrants to look for better education, and social and economic opportunities. There is no obligation for Toba people to live in the Toba region, although they are obliged to be attached to their original village in Toba. The original village or Bius of a Toba Batak person is called Bona Pasogit. It is common for a Toba Batak person to identify his/her origin not by their birthplaces, but by their Bona Pasogit in Tano Batak or ‘The Batak Land’.

Just as it is with other ethnicities, the Toba people have also migrated to other places to look for a better life. For example, the majority of the Silindung natives are the Hutabarat, Panggabean, Simorangkir, Hutagalung, Hutapea and Lumbantobing clans. Instead all those six clans are actually descendants of Guru Mangaloksa, one of Raja Hasibuan's sons from Toba region. So it is with the Nasution clan where most of them live in Padangsidimpuan, surely share a common ancestor with their relative, the Siahaan clan in Balige. It is certain that the Toba people as a distinct culture can be found beyond the boundaries of their geographical origins. According to the folklore of the Batak people, the first ancestor of the Batak people is Si Raja Batak, literally means ‘King Batak’ or ‘the King of Batak’. His origin is believed to be from a Toba village known as Sianjur Mula village, situated on the slopes of Mount Pusuk Buhit, about 45 minutes drive from Pangururan, the capital of Samosir Regency today.

=== Toba clans and families ===
A surname or family name (marga) is part of a Toba person's name, which identifies the clan or family they belonged to. The Batak Toba people always have a surname or family name. The surname or family name is obtained from the father's lineage (paternal) which would then be passed on to the offspring continuously. Nainggolan, Napitupulu, Pardede, Gultom, Panggabean, Silalahi, Siahaan, Simanjuntak, Sihombing, Sitorus, Panjaitan, Sitompul, Marbun, Lumban Tobing, Aritonang, Pangaribuan, Situmorang, Kartodimedjo, Manurung, Marpaung, Hutapea, Tambunan, Silitonga, Tampubolon, Sinaga, Siregar, Pakpahan, Sidabutar, Aruan, Ambarita, and Simatupang are among the common surnames. However, the number of all Toba Batak clans are in hundreds.

=== Traditional house ===
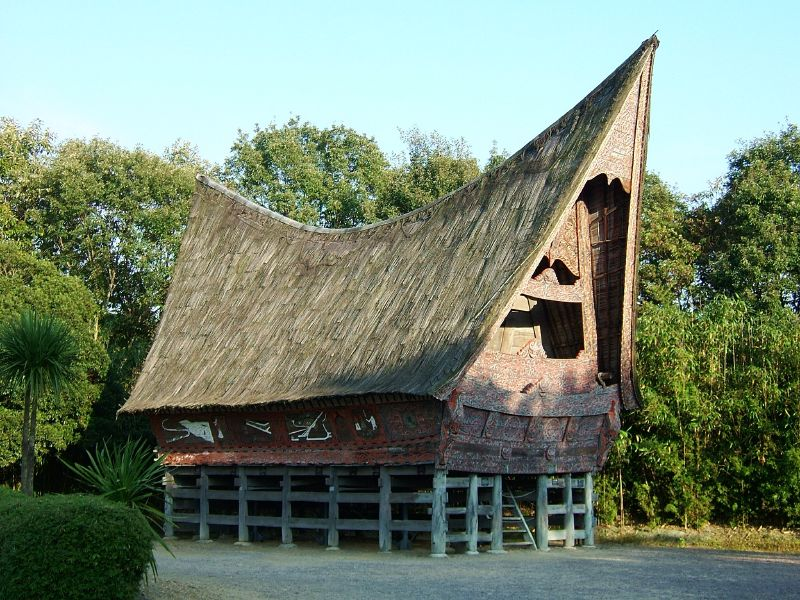
A traditional Toba house.

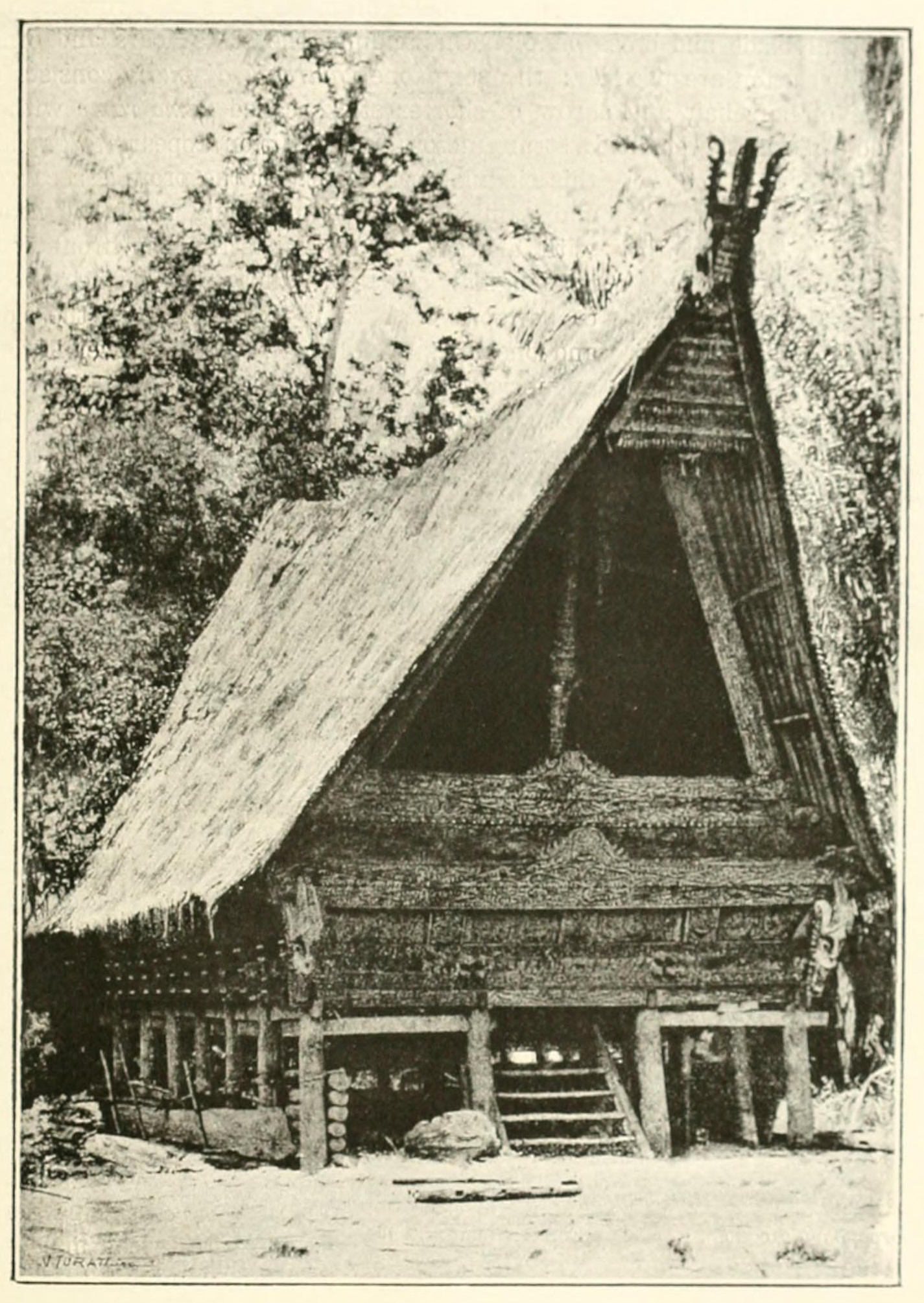
House of a Toba Batak chief.

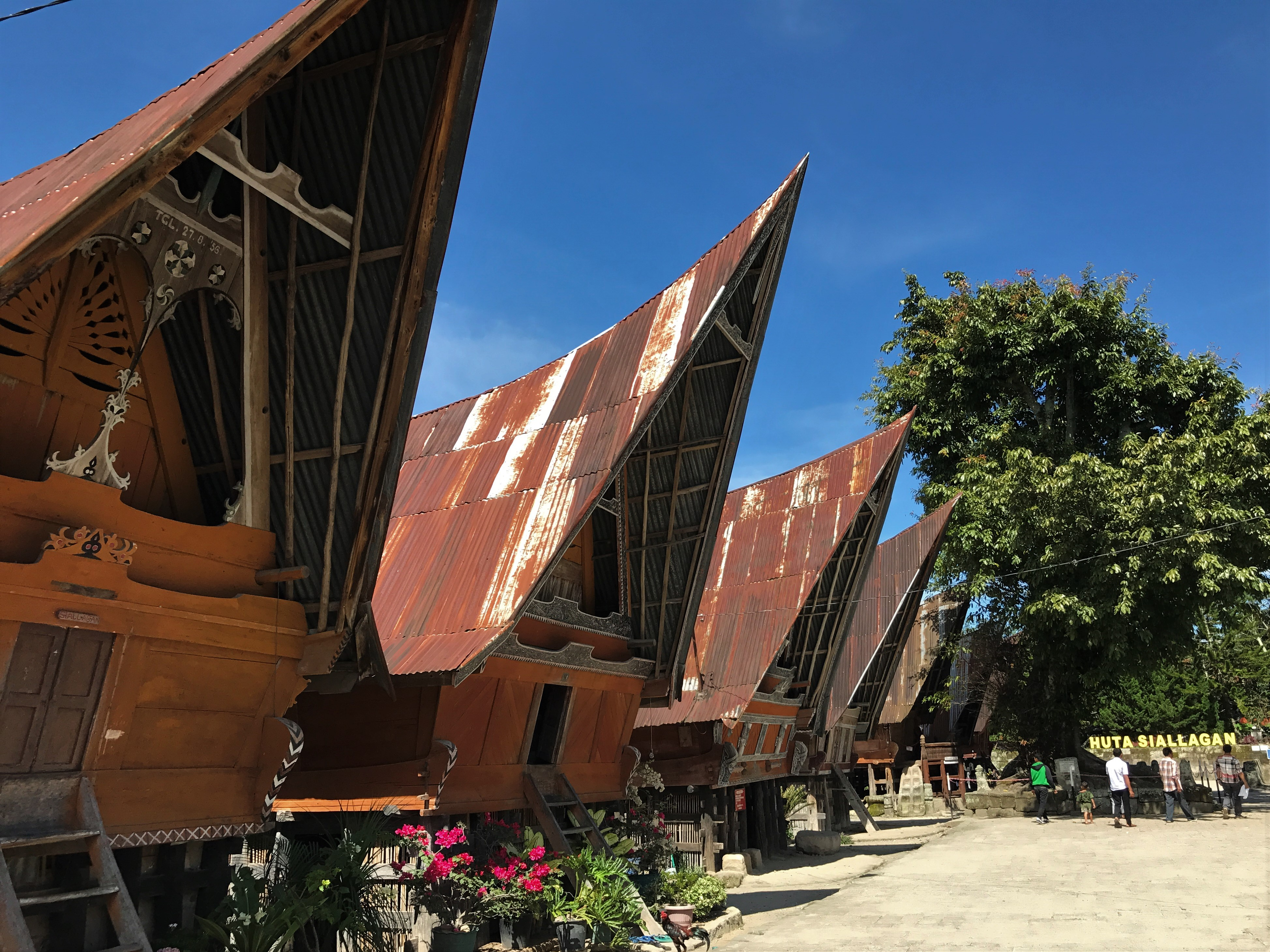
Rumah Bolon (Big house), Toba Batak house

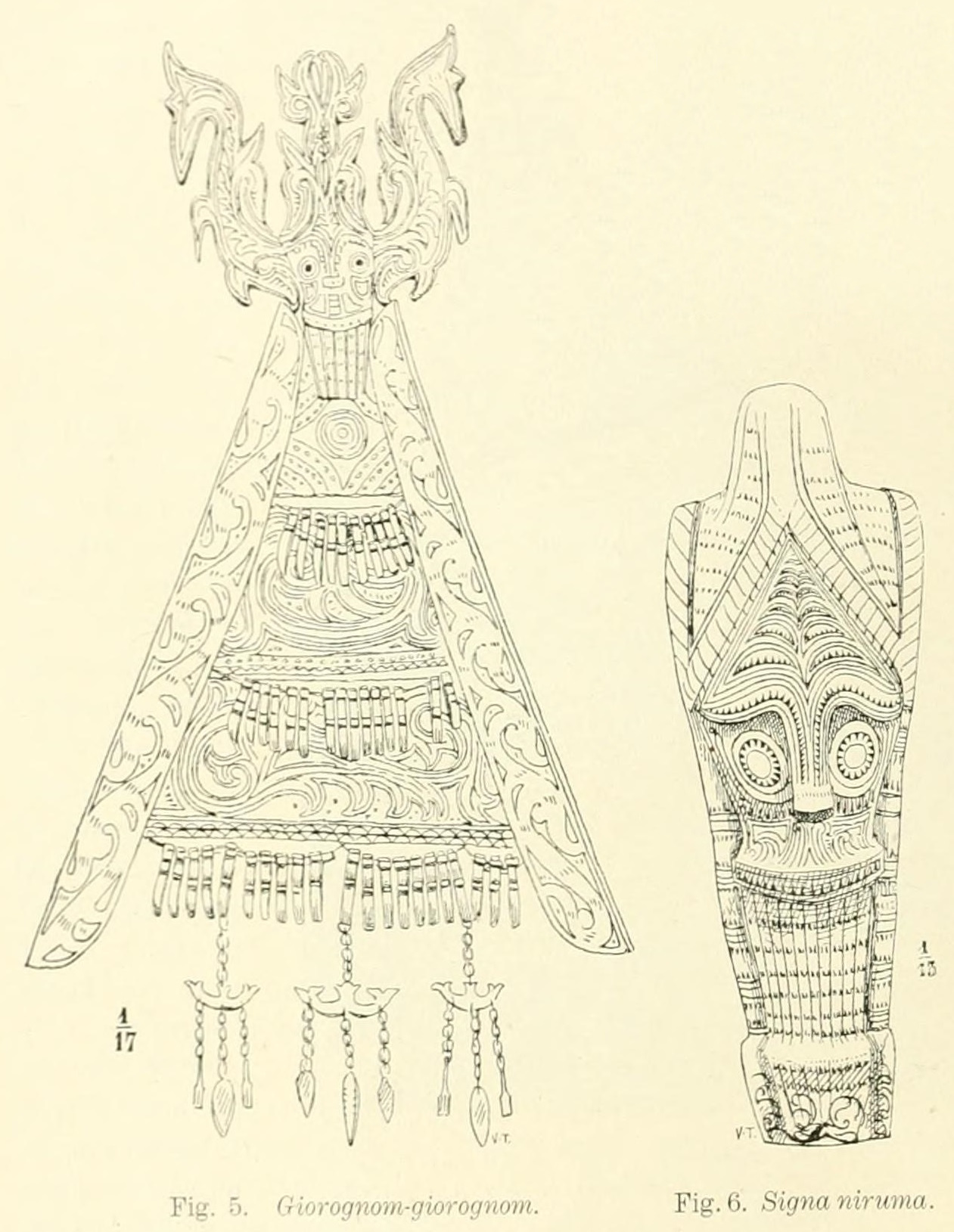
Giorognom-giorognom (carving at the top of a Toba house) and signa (figurehead on either side of a Toba house)

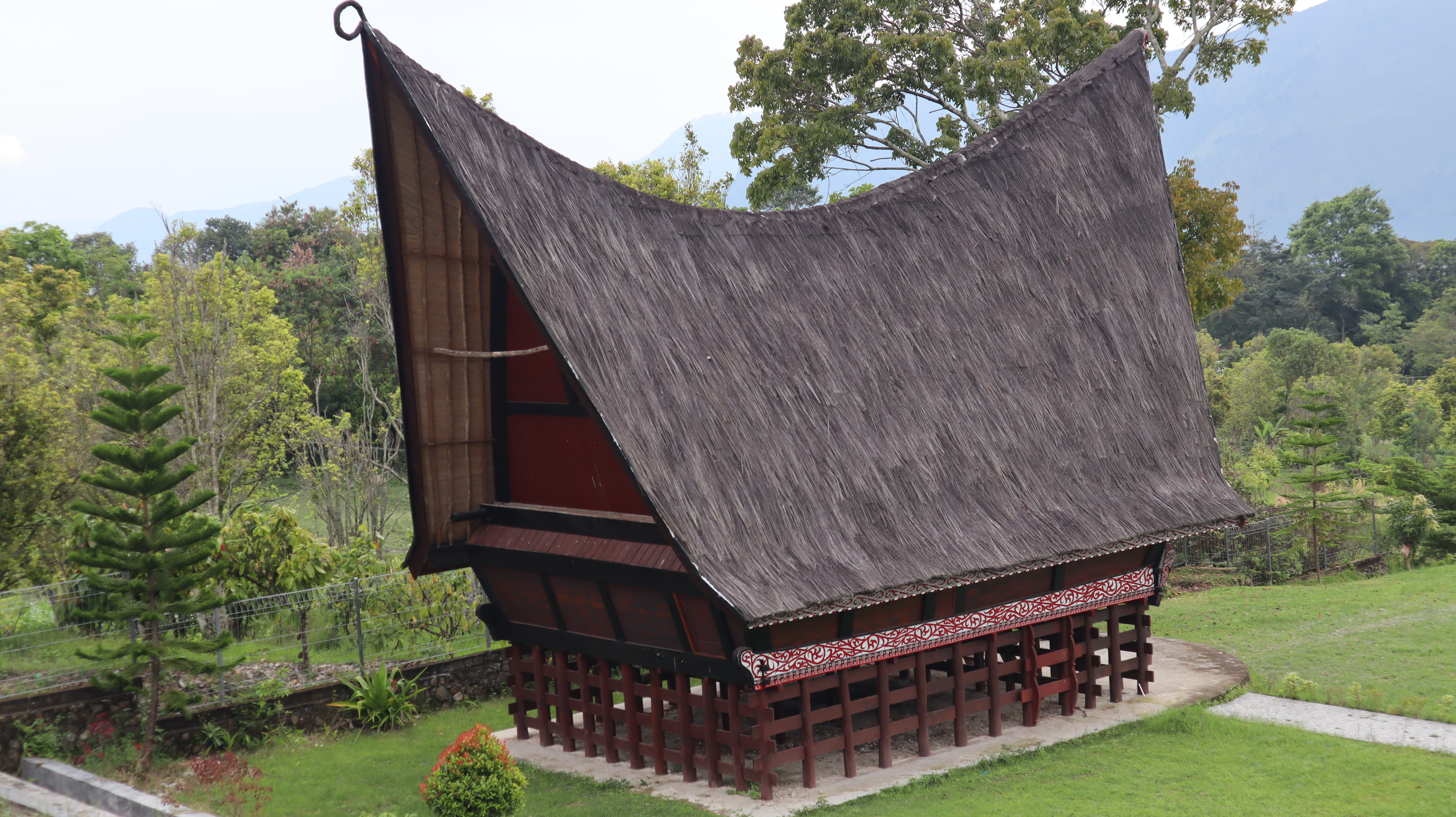
Rumah Bolon (Jabu bolon)

The traditional house of the Toba people is called rumah bolon. It is a rectangular building that can house up to five or six families. One can enter a rumah bolon through a staircase in the middle of the house with an odd numbers of steps (odd number of staircase means offspring of slave, even number of staircase means offspring of king). When a person enters the house, one must bow in order to avoid one's head from knocking the transverse beam at the entrance of the traditional house. The interpretation of this is that the guests must respect the owner of the house.

=== Boat ===
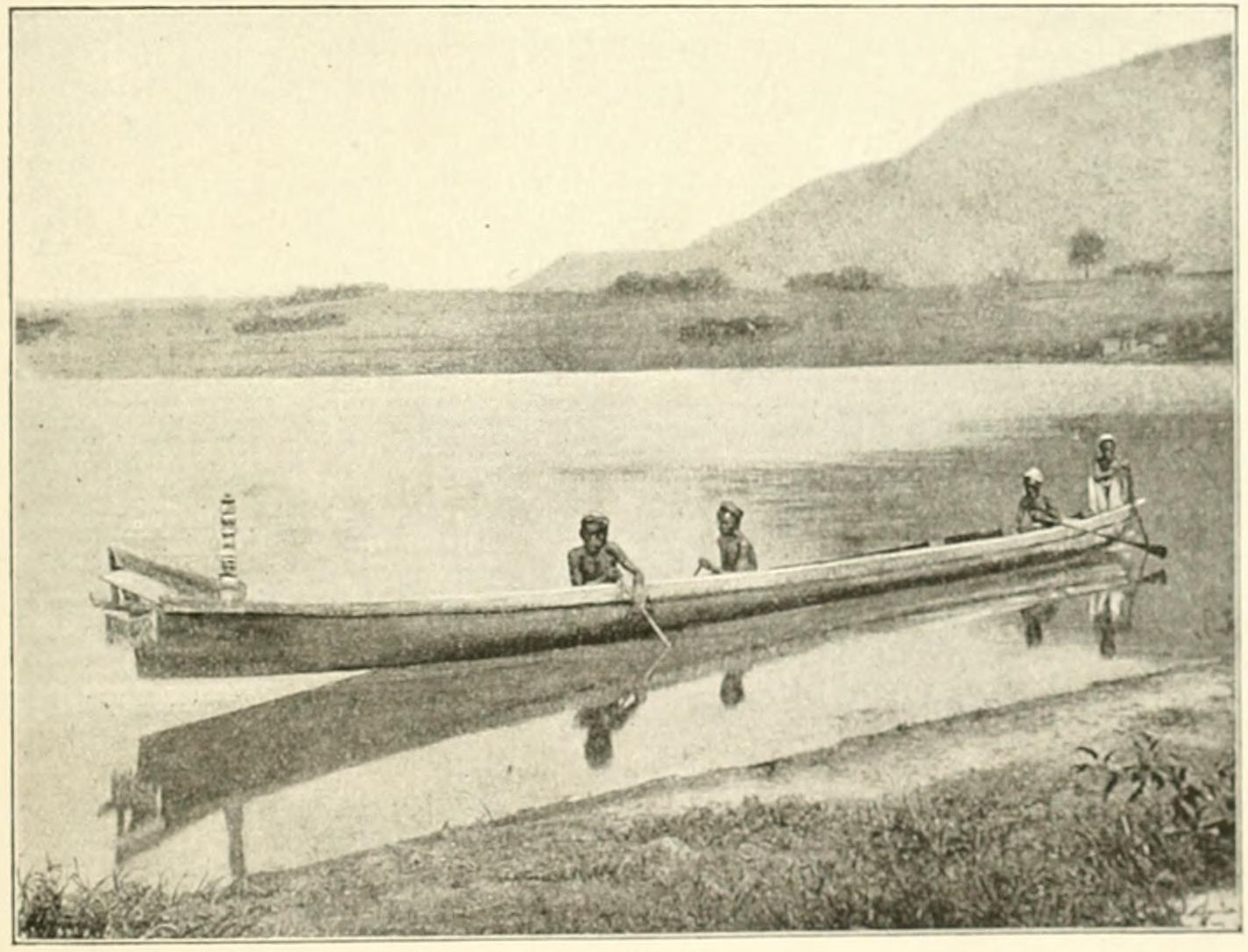
A Solu on lake Toba.

The traditional boat of the Toba Batak people is the solu. It is a dugout canoe, with boards added on the side bound with iron tacks. The boat is propelled by sitting rowers, who sit in pairs on cross seats.

=== Views of Toba people in Indonesian culture ===
The Toba Batak are known throughout Indonesia as capable musicians, and are perceived as confident, outspoken and willing to question authority, expressing differences in order to resolve them through discussion. This outlook on life is contrasted to Javanese people, Indonesia's largest ethnic group, who are more culturally conciliatory and less willing to air differences publicly. Batak Toba people are also known as professing Christians in contrast with the largely Muslim population in Indonesia. In terms of occupational sector, Batak Toba is also known to be well represented in some sectors particularly law, education, military, economy, and politics.

== Religion ==
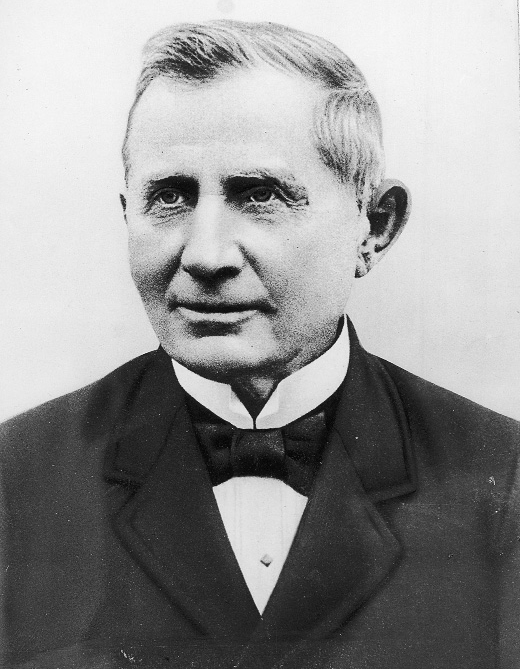
Ludwig Ingwer Nommensen, the German Lutheran missionary travelling of Batak lands, especially Toba Batak people

An overwhelming majority of the Toba Batak people are adherents of Christianity. The value and practice of Christianity are absorbed deeply into the daily life of the Toba people in combination with the practice of Toba traditional customs known as Adat. The currently pertaining traditional law, customs, and regulations used by most Batak Toba people to regulate their social relations nowadays were products of discussions between the Christian Toba Batak Rajas with the German Missionaries during the 1886 to evaluate the pre-Christian customs of the Toba Batak society to be inline with Christian values and Church Ordinance. The result of this discussion is the codification of Batak Toba customs by the Christian Rajahs and the Missionaries into two treaties: Ruhut Parsaoron di Habatahon 1898 or The Customs regulating the social life of the Batak (referred to as Ruhut), and Patik dohot Uhum ni Halak Batak 1899 or Laws and Regulations of the Batak people (referred to as Patik).

Most of the Toba people are adherents of Protestantism with Lutheranism as the biggest denomination. After Protestantism, Catholicism is the second largest religious belief among the Toba people. Being the largest ethnic group in the Indonesian Protestant community, it is common for Protestant churches in Indonesia to provide service in Toba Batak language.

The first Protestant missionaries who tried to reach the Batak highlands of inner Northern Sumatra were English and American Baptist preachers in the 1820s and 1830s but without any success. After Franz Wilhelm Junghuhn and Herman Neubronner van der Tuuk did intensive research on Batak language and culture in the 1840s, a new attempt was done in 1861 by several missionaries sent out by the German Rhenish Missionary Society (RMG). The first Bataks were baptized during this year. In 1864, Ludwig Ingwer Nommensen from the German Rhenish Missionary Society reached the Batak region and founded a village called "Huta Dame" (village of peace) in the district of Tapanuli in Tarutung, North Sumatra.

The Batak Christian Protestant Church (Indonesian: Huria Kristen Batak Protestan) is the largest Protestant church with Lutheranism in Indonesia. It was founded by the German missionaries and still regarded as the traditional church of the Toba Batak people. In the early 20th century, HKBP disported into several independent Protestant churches such as GKPS (Simalungun) and GKPA (Angkola) to accommodate church services for the Batak people outside of the Toba community.

Before the conversion to Christianity, the old belief of the Toba Batak tribe was a mixture of Animism and Hinduism with significant influence of Islam. In the beginning of the 20th century, some Toba Batak Rajahs who refused to embrace Christianity instituted a religion inspired by the pre-Christian Toba Batak beliefs, customs and practices. This religion is called Ugamo Malim with its adherents called Parmalim. The Parmalims worship Debata Mula Jadi Nabolon, which means The Great Almighty God.

A minority of Toba Batak are adherents of Sunni Islam. Many of the Muslim Toba Batak are originated from Barus, Sorkam, Sibolga, Balige, and Asahan areas. They are generally regarded as the original Toba Batak Muslims, although, sometimes the Batak Muslims from these regions are identified and self-identified as distinct sub-group known as Coastal Bataks (Pesisir people) in the west coast of North Sumatra and Batak Pardembanan in Asahan Regency. In some cases of conversion to Islam, there are occurrences of Toba Batak Muslims disassociating themselves with Toba Batak customs and identity and prefer association with other ethnic identities (e.g. of their spouses) or to disassociate ethnic identity at all. This would cause the departure from the traditional Toba Batak customs and adoption of the more conventional Islamic customs in instances such as wedding or burial, as many aspects of the former are now seen as no longer compatible with Islamic standard.

== See also ==
- Batak Toba language
- Simalungun people
- Karo people (Indonesia)
