= Simangunsong =

Batak surname originating in Indonesia

Simangunsong is one of Toba Batak clans originating in North Sumatra, Indonesia. People of this clan bear the clan's name as their surname. Notable people of this clan include:

- Dewi Lestari Simangunsong (born 1976), Indonesian writer, singer, and songwriter
- Hendrik Simangunsong (born 1969), Indonesian boxer
- Noha Simangunsong (born 2010), Indonesian-Finnish footballer
