= Ulos =

Traditional Batak draped cloth garment of North Sumatra, Indonesia

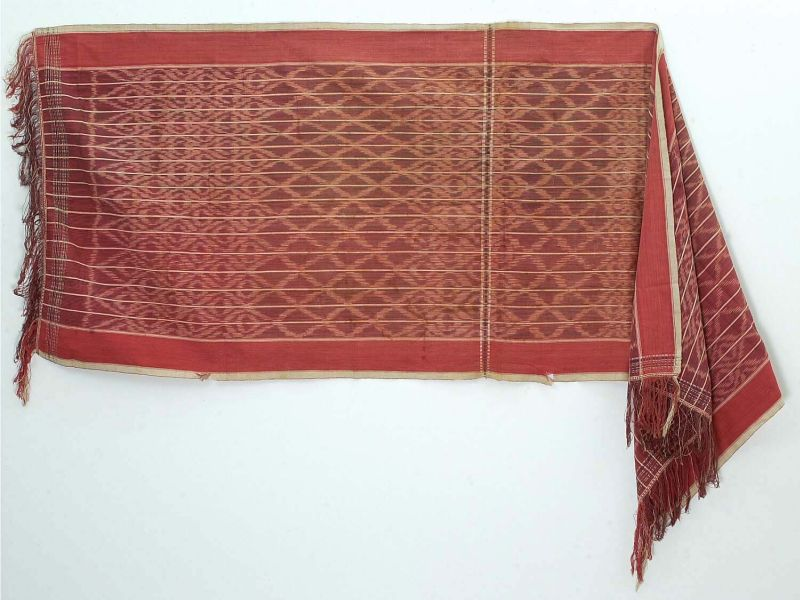
- Type: Art fabric
- Material: Silk and cotton
- Place of origin: Indonesia (North Sumatra)

Ulos is the traditional tenun fabric of the Batak people of North Sumatra in Indonesia. The ulos is normally worn draped over the shoulder or shoulders, or in weddings to ceremonially bind the bride and groom together. Ulos are traditionally hand-woven. With increasing modernization, ulos lost its significance.

In traditional marriage ceremony, the ulos is given by the bride's parents to the groom's mother as ulos pargomgom.

== History ==
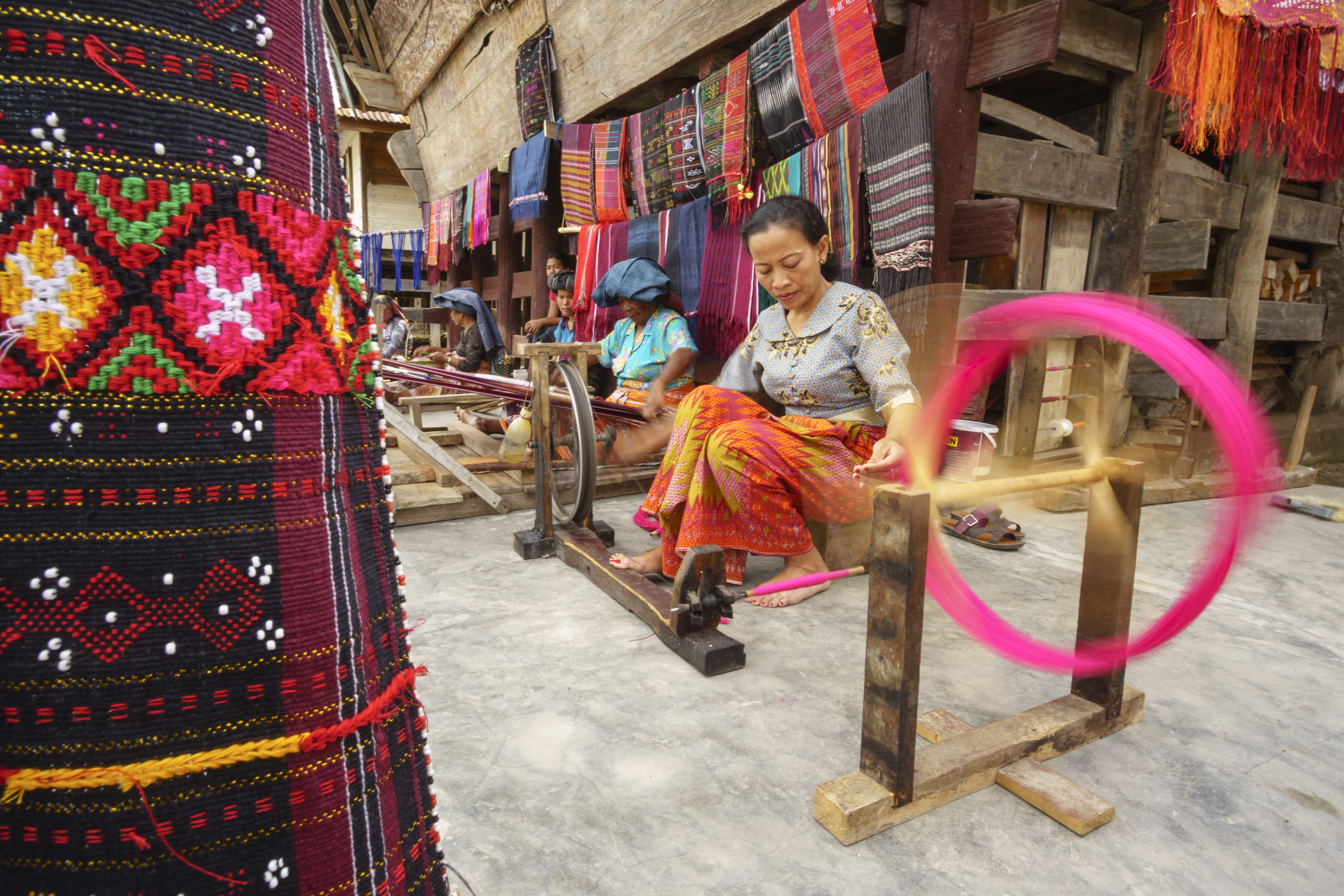
Traditional Batak tailors making tenun ulos in Huta Raja village, North Sumatra, Indonesia

According to the Batak people, there are three sources of warmth for humans: Sun, Fire, and Ulos. They created something that could give them warmth, also believed to be able to give the men bravery and the women strength against infertility. At first, Ulos was only used as an ordinary cloth, but it later developed into a symbol of love and traditional ceremony requirements.

There are many kinds and motifs of ulos. If ulos is used by a man, the upper part of it is called ande-ande, the lower called singkot, and the one used on the head is called tali-tali, or bulang-bulang. Ulos Jugja, Sadum, Ragidup, and Runjat are only used on some occasions.

== Usage ==
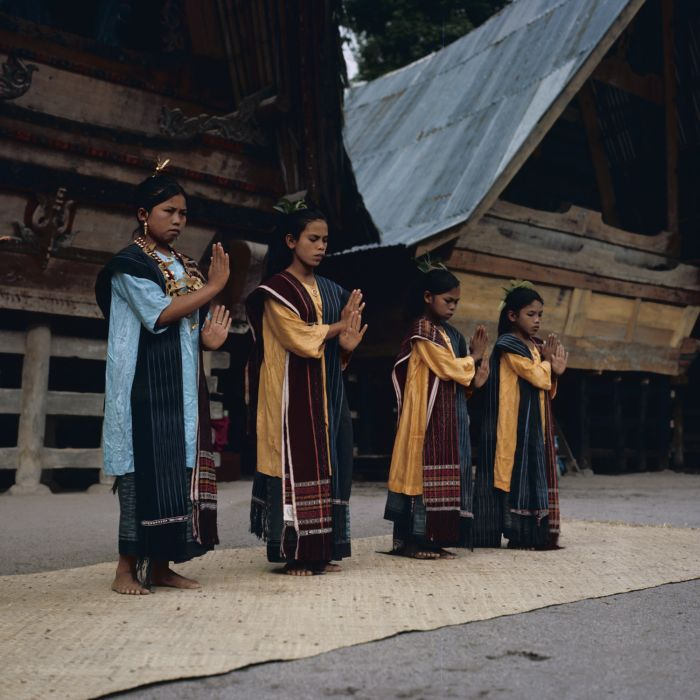
Toba Batak people performing a traditional dance wearing ulos

When Ulos is used by a female, the bottom is called haen, the back is called hoba-hoba, and if it is used as a scarf, it is called ampe-ampe; if used as a head cover, it is called saong; and if used to carry a baby, it is called parompa. The females usually wear a black long dress and head cover. Siabithonon (worn on the body as a shirt or sarong) ulos are ragidup, sibolang, runjat, and jobit. Sihadanghononton (used as head cover) ulos are sirara, sumbat, bolean, mangiring, surisuri, and sadum. Sitalitalihononton (to be tied at the hip) ulos are tumtuman, mangiring, and padangrusa.

Ulos as a love symbol is called mangulosi. In Batak culture, mangulosi (giving ulos) is a symbol of love to the receiver. There are common rules: mangulosi can only be done by people who have a family relationship or to give it to lower social status people. For example, parents can mangulosi their children, but not the opposite. To mangulosi a child who gives birth to their first child, the ulos given is ragidup sinagok. Ulos given to a special guest is ulos ragidup silingo.

== Production ==
Ulos is made with a manual loom machine. A spinner (Sorha) is used to make cotton into yards. Palabuan (periuk tanah, an earthenware pot) is used to save coloring water. Ulos are made of cotton.

== See also ==
- Ikat
- Balinese textiles
- Kebaya
- Batik
