= Vandiko Gultom =

Indonesia politician

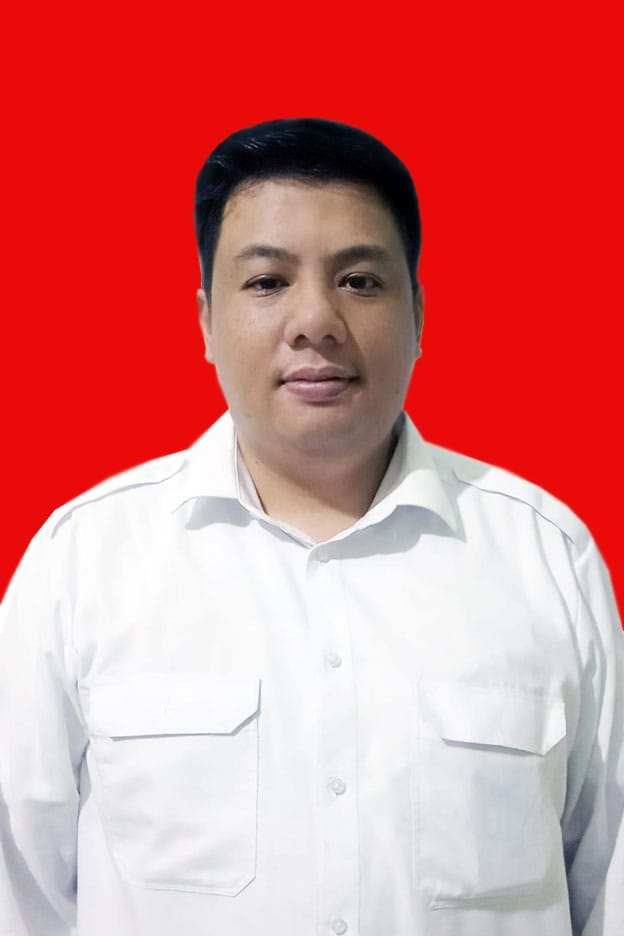

Regent of Samosir
- Assuming office 17 February 2021
- Governor: Edy Rahmayadi
- Deputy: Martua Sitanggang
- Succeeding: Rapidin Simbolon

Personal details
- Born: February 16, 1992 (age 34) Banjarmasin, South Kalimantan

Vandiko Gultom (born 16 February 1992) is an Indonesian Bataknese politician who was elected as the Regent of Samosir in the 2020 Samosir regental election.

== Early life and education ==
Vandiko was born on in Banjarmasin, South Kalimantan to Ober Gultom and Junita Panjaitan. His father, Ober Gultom, was a high-ranking public servant in the Ministry of Public Works and Housing. The oldest child in a Protestant family, he has a sister named Ersya.

Gultom studied in three different islands during his formative years, which gave a strong impact on how he views the correlation between the improvement of regional infrastructure and the importance of human development. He began his primary education at the Santa Maria Elementary School in West Kotawaringin, in the island of Kalimantan, 1998. He finished his elementary education six years later, and continued to the Santo Paulus Catholic Junior High School in Palangkaraya in 2004 and to the Santo Thomas High School in Medan, in the island of Sumatra, in 2007. After he graduated from high school, Vandiko moved to another island, Java, and enrolled at the Sepuluh Nopember Institute of Technology, Surabaya, in 2010. He graduated from the institute in 2016 with a thesis titled Feasibility Study on Changing the Status of Provincial Road to National Road with a Hierarchy of Primary Arteries from an Economic Point of View on the Tele - Pangururan Road Segment in the Samosir Regency.

Gultom wrote his undergraduate thesis under the supervision of the legendary Wahju Herijanto, once well-known as the oldest doctoral-degree graduate in the history of institute with perfect cumulative GPA (4.00).

== Regent of Samosir ==
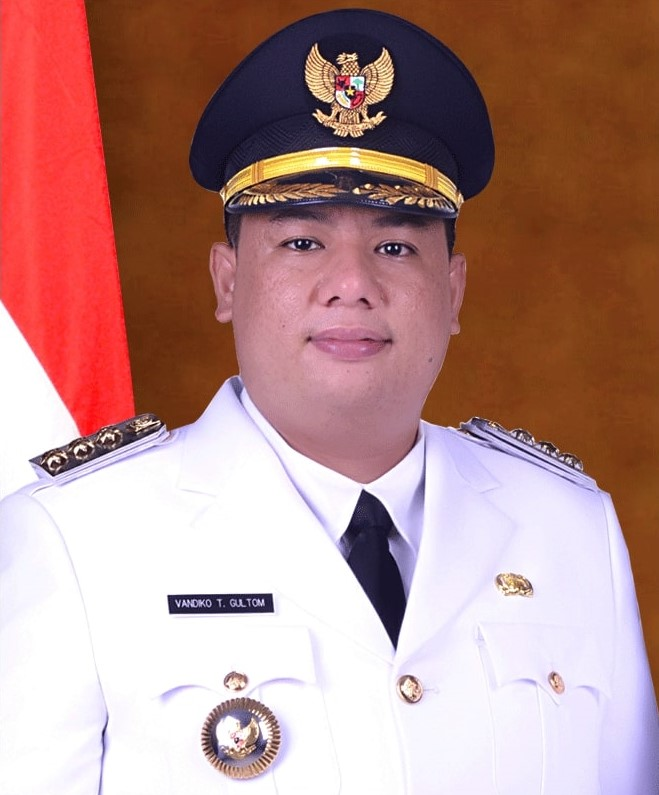
Vandiko Gultom as the Regent of Samosir.

=== Election ===
Vandiko announced his plan to run as a candidate for the Regent of Samosir in September 2019. Nasdem, PKB, Golkar, Democratic, Gerindra, dan Hanura announced their support for Vandiko.

Vandiko initially chose Raun Sitanggang, a former bureaucrat who served in Basuki Tjahaja Purnama's administration, as his running mate. Raun was supported by Golkar and PKB. Vandiko stated that he chose Raun Sitanggang as a representative of the "old generation" in Samosir, as he himself was a millennial and was considered a representative of the "young generation". However, on 12 July 2020, Vandiko shifted his choice to Martua Sitanggang, who formerly planned to run as a candidate for regent. As a result, Raun's supporters shifted their support to Rapidin Simbolon, the incumbent regent who also planned to run in the elections.

Vandiko and Martua officially registered themselves as a candidate to Samosir's General Elections Commission on 5 September 2020. On 23 September 2020, the commission announced three eligible candidates for the election, including Vandiko. Vandiko faced Rapidin Simbolon, who was supported by the Indonesian Democratic Party of Struggle (PDIP) and Commodore (Ret.) Marhuale Simbolon, who ran as an independent candidate. Ballot number was assigned the next day with Vandiko as candidate number 2. Vandiko adopted the jargon Vantas (Vandiko Gultom-Martua Sitanggang), a play on the word pantas (decent) and the tagline "Pro Development".

Campaigns officially began on 26 September 2020. Vandiko's campaign team included names such as Benny Pasaribu, Jhoni Allen Marbun, Lamhot Sinaga (member of the People's Representative Council) and Mangindar Simbolon (former Regent of Samosir). Debates were held on 16 and 30 November in Medan. During the debate, Vandiko admitted his nescience on the togu togu ro (money politics) phenomenon in Samosir. He stated that after his opponent Rapidin Simbolon accused him of paying 40 trillion rupiahs to become the candidate for regent.

Elections were held on 9 December 2020 on the same day as other elections during the 2020 Indonesian local elections. Vandiko campaign team deployed witnesses to the individual polling stations across the regency. Vandiko himself voted in the Sitamiang village, his ancestral village, along with his mother, father, and sister. Following the voting, immediate quick count results favored Vandiko's victory. Official results were announced by the General Elections Commission on 16 December 2020, with Vandiko obtaining 41,806 votes or 53,16 percent of the total votes. Vandiko was declared as the winner of the election.

Following the announcement, the PDIp requested the disqualification of Vandiko. Djarot Saiful Hidayat, the chairman of the North Sumatra branch of the party, stated that Vandiko's team used around 100 trillion rupiahs to buy votes. Arteria Dahlan, a politician from the PDIP, announced that the party had found evidence of Vandiko's campaign team providing one million rupiahs to families in Samosir in order to get Vandiko elected. The party then brought the allegations to Samosir's General Election Supervisory Agency. However, the agency refused to investigate the allegations, citing lack of evidence as their reason.
