= Sigalegale =

Indonesian traditional wooden puppet figure

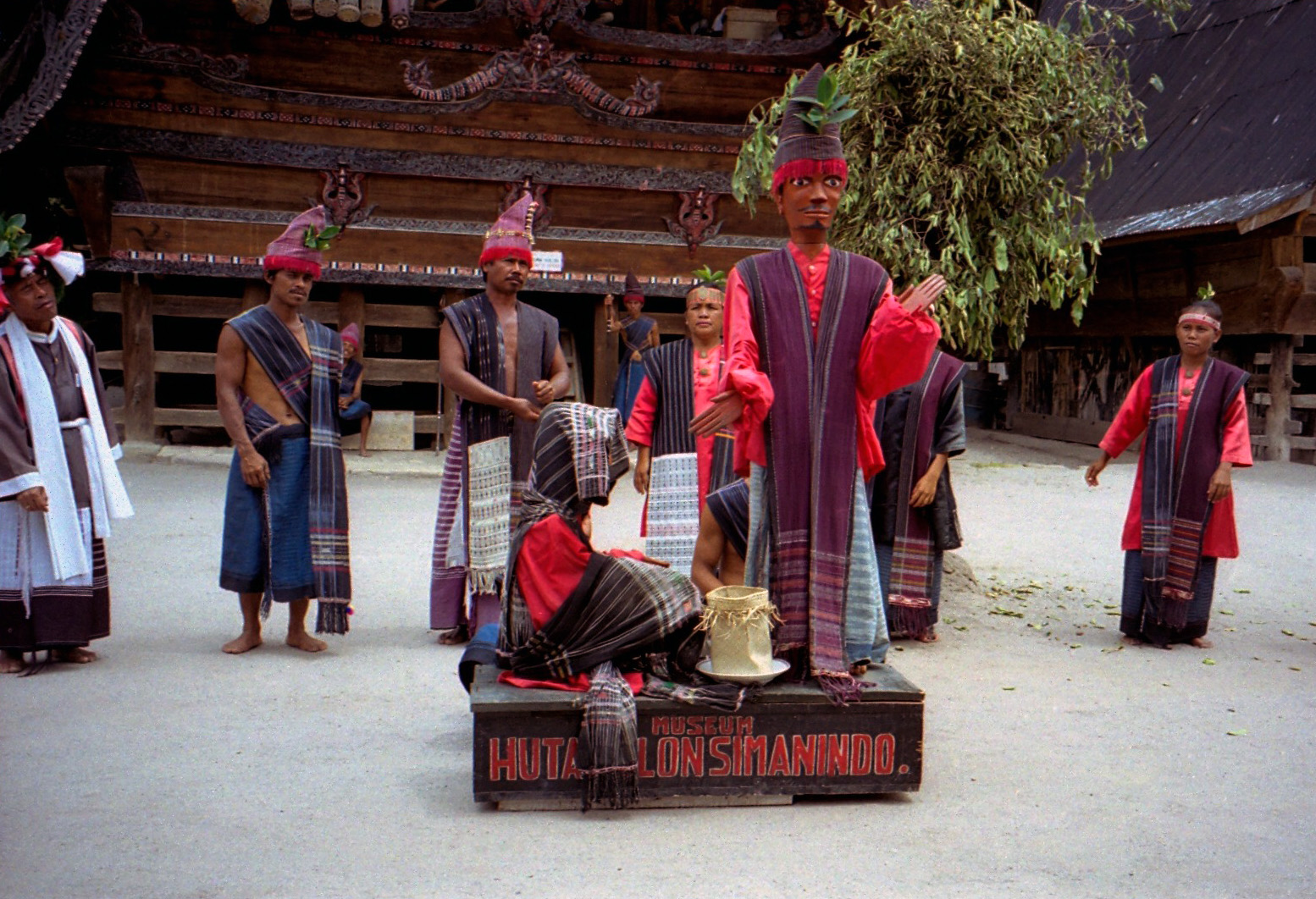
- Sigalegale dance puppets of Huta Bolon Simanindo Museum in Simanindo, Samosir Island, North Sumatra, Indonesia.
- Native name: ᯘᯪᯎᯞᯩᯎᯞᯩ (Batak); Sigalegale (Batak Toba)
- Instrument(s): Gondang, Sarune, Ogung, Garantung, Sulim
- Inventor: Batak
- Origin: Indonesia

Sigalegale (Batak: ᯘᯪᯎᯞᯩᯎᯞᯩ ) is a wooden puppet used in a funeral dance performance of the Batak people in Samosir Island, Northern Sumatra. Sigale Gale is a well-known feature for visiting tourists. During the dance, the puppet is operated from behind, like a marionette, using strings that run through the ornate wooden platform on which it stands. The setup enables its arms and body to be moved and its head to turn.

Traditionally the performance was carried out of childless person. Batak Toba believe souls become an ancestral spirit and the children of the deceased perform funerary rites. If a person died childless a si gale-gale is created as a substitute. Complicated sigale gale could be life sized and featured actuation using wet moss or sponges that could be squeezed to make the dolls appear to cry.

The wooden figure has jointed limbs were mounted on large, wheeled platforms on which, weeping, they danced during funerary ceremonies called papurpur sapata, held for persons of high rank who had died without offspring. The ritual dispelled the curse of dying childless, and placated the spirit of the deceased so that he would do no harm to the community.

== Legend ==
The use of the si gale-gale figure is said to have originated from the legend of a childless woman named Nai Manggale, who on her deathbed instructed her husband to have a lifesize image made of herself to be called si gale-gale and to have a dirge played before it. Unless this was done, her spirit would not be admitted to the abode of the dead, which would in turn force her to put a curse on her surviving spouse. To avert this misfortune, the si gale-gale was created. Si gale-gale figures are either male or female, depending on the gender of the deceased.

== Early reference ==
Among the earliest references to the si gale-gale is the German missionary Johannes Warneck's description of the sculpture's use in the early twentieth century. When a rich man died without a surviving son, his relatives held a special feast both to mourn his death and to demonstrate his wealth. For this festival a wooden figure in the likeness of the deceased was commissioned and clothed in traditional costume, with shawl, headdress, and gold jewelry. Mounted on a wheeled platform and manipulated by an elaborate system of strings, the figure danced while the deceased's wife, parents, and brothers danced alongside, weeping. The image was led ceremoniously to the market, where pork, beef, or buffalo meat was distributed·among those gathered. After the prescribed period of dancing, the si gale-gale was shot and thrown over the village walls. The Batak saying "Wealthy for a moment like a si gale-gale figure" thus refers to a rich man with no heirs to care for his spirit in the afterlife.

== Gallery ==
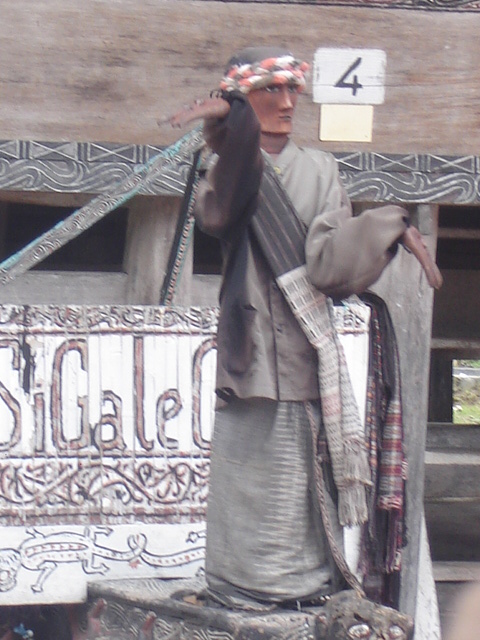
Sigale Gale puppet from Samosir

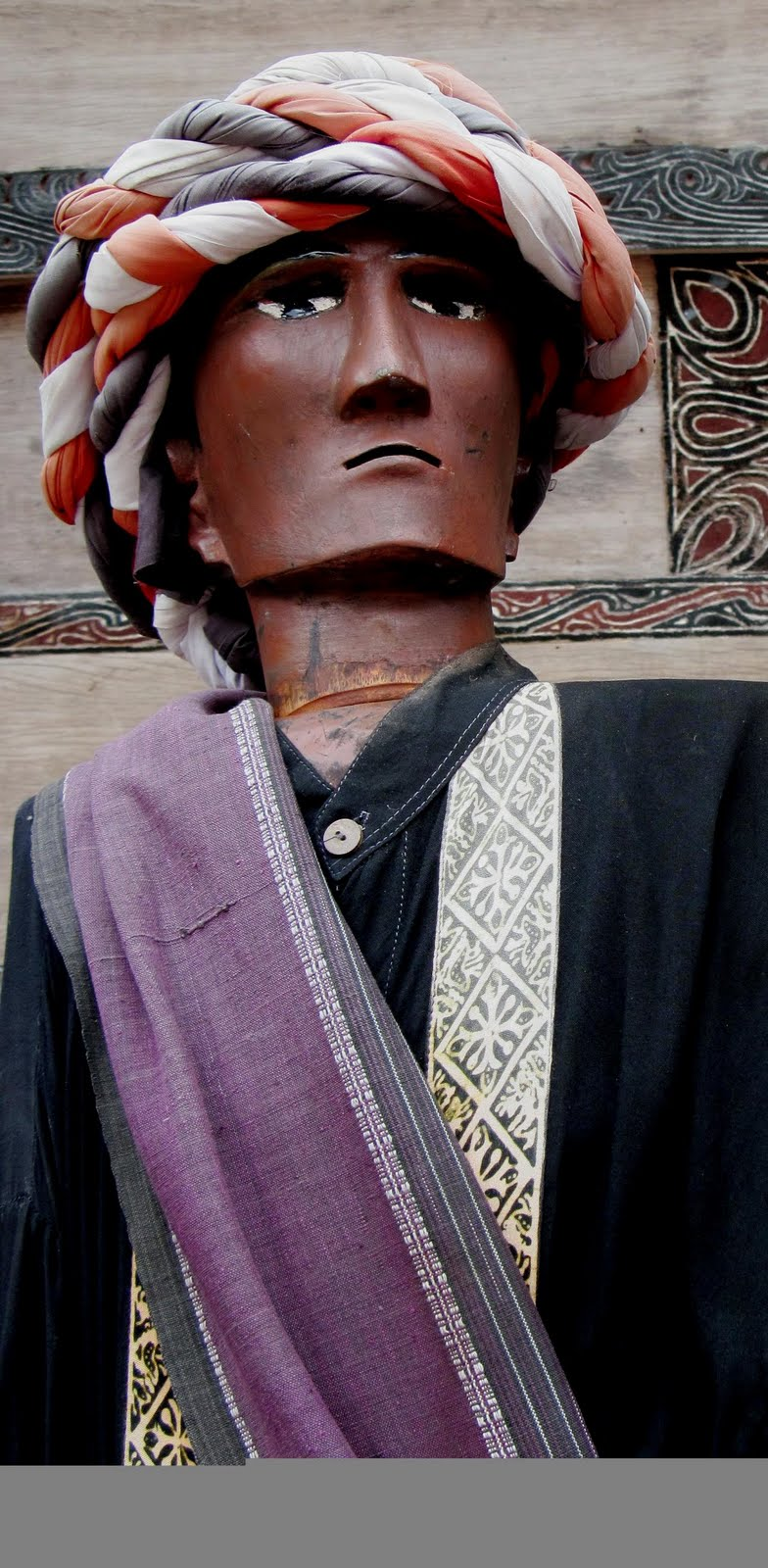
Sigale gale face

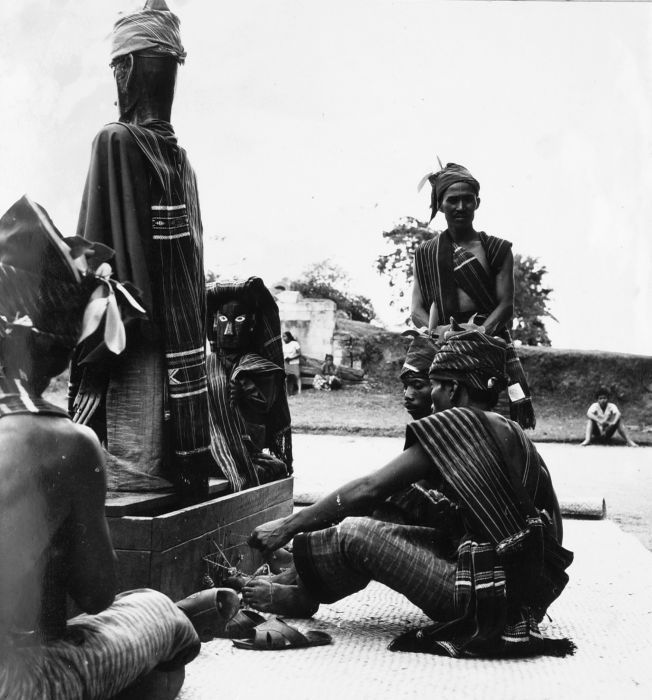
Puppeteer operating from behind the figure (1970)

== See also ==
- Tor-tor dance
- Tandok dance
- Dance in Indonesia
- Sigalegalephrynus, a toad genus named after the puppets
