= Tortor =

Indonesian traditional dance

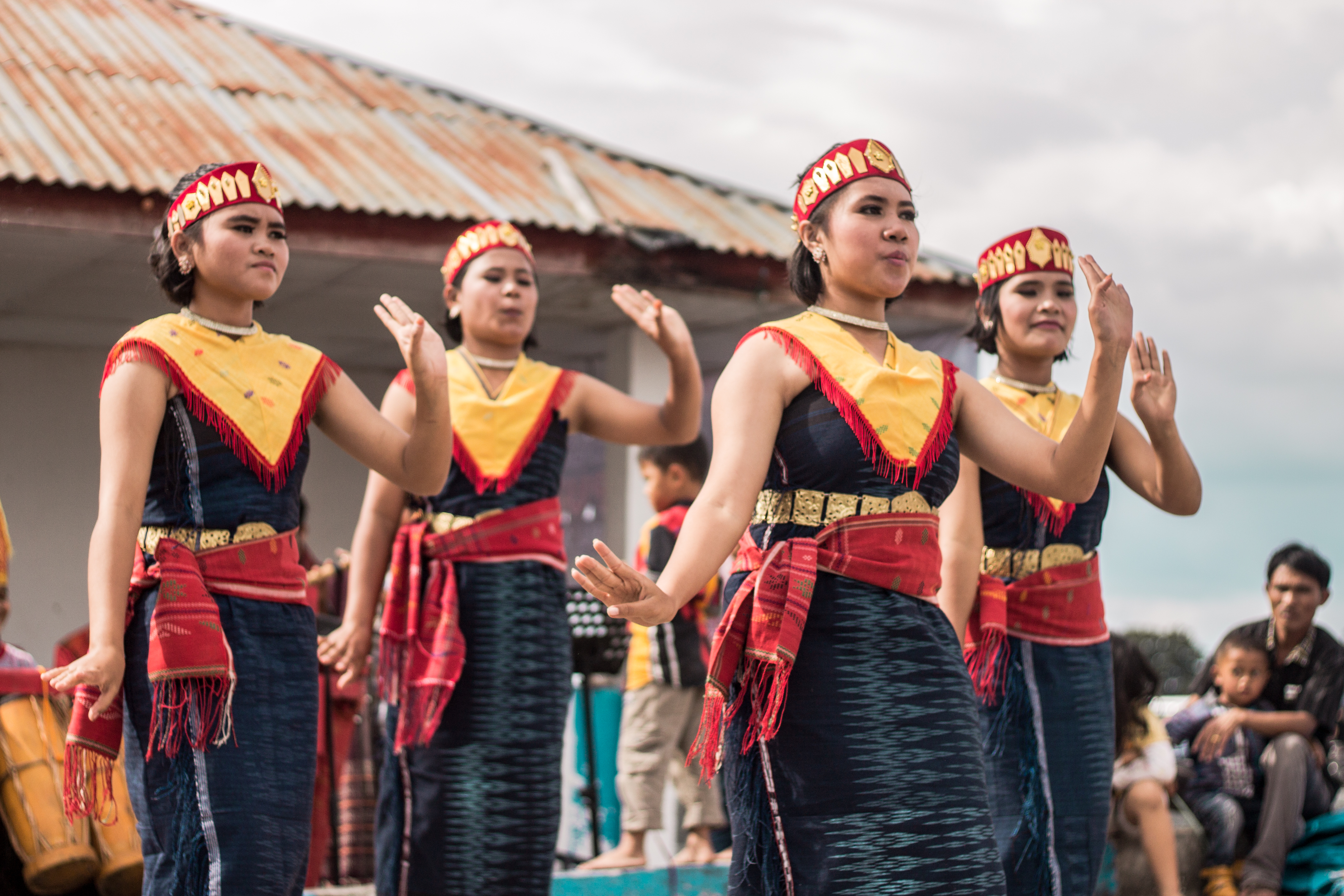
- Tortor performance
- Native name: ᯖᯬᯒ᯲ᯖᯬᯒ᯲ (Batak)
- Instrument: Gondang style of gendang
- Inventor: Batak
- Origin: Indonesia

Tortor (Batak: ᯖᯬᯒ᯲ᯖᯬᯒ᯲) is a traditional Batak dance originating from North Sumatra, Indonesia. This dance was originally a ritual and sacred dance performed at funerals, healing ceremonies, and other traditional Batak ceremonies. For the Batak people, tortor dance has both cultural and spiritual values. Through this dance, people express their hopes and prayers. Demonstrations of attitudes and feelings through this dance describe the situation and conditions that are being experienced.

Tortor performances always have a situational nature which is reflected in the type of tor-tor displayed, such as Tortor Sombasomba (worship), Tortor Simonangmonang (victory), or Tortor Habonaran (truth). The tortor dance is played to the accompaniment of gondang musical instruments. The word "tortor" comes from the sound of the dancers stomping their feet while performing on the board of a Batak traditional house.

== History ==
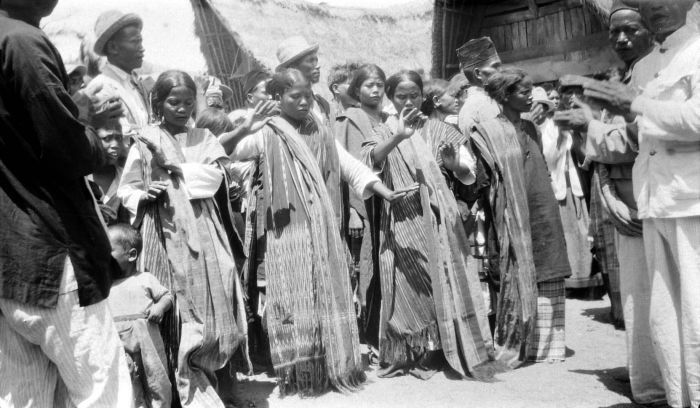
Tor-tor dance in Batak village, circa 1900

Tortor dance is one of the oldest dances in Indonesia. That said, this dance has existed since prehistoric times. However, the opinion that says tor-tor dance has existed since prehistoric times is still doubted by a number of experts considering there is not much evidence to support it. Until now there has been no scientific literature that explains the history of the tor tor dance and the gondang that accompanies it. However, there are records from the colonial era that describe the journey of the tortor dance. Although it comes from the Batak, it turns out that if we traced this dance, it was influenced by Indian and Middle Eastern cultures. Even further, this dance also has links with Babylonian culture. There is another opinion that estimates that the tor-tor dance has existed since the 13th century AD and has become part of the Batak culture.

The early development of this dance was only in the life of the Batak people in the Samosir, Toba and parts of the Humbang area. In practice, the tor-tor dance also involves several stone statues that have been entered by spirits and the statues will "dance". Then the tor tor dance underwent a transformation along with the entry of Christianity in the Silindung area. At that time, the tor-tor culture was better known as the art of modern singing and dance. The tor-tor dance in Pahae is known for its joyful dance and rhyming song called tumba or pahae do mula ni tumba. From here, the tor tor dance is no longer related to spirits and other supernatural elements, but becomes a cultural device that is inherent in the life of the Batak people.

== Form and movement ==
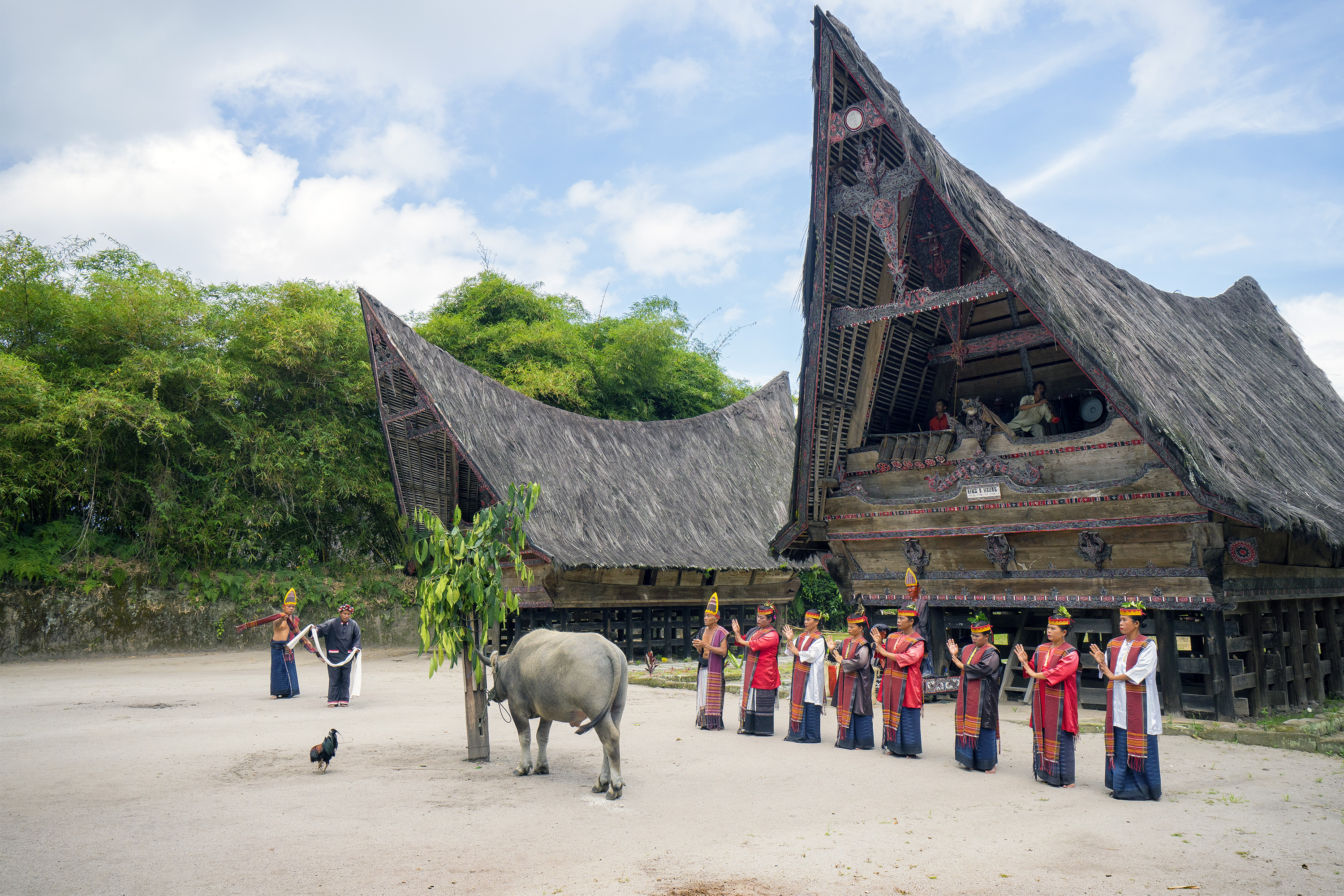
Tor tor dance performance around the traditional Batak house during the celebration of the buffalo sacrifice to Mula Jadi Na Bolon (the creator of all things)

Tor-tor is not only a dance, but also a medium of communication. This can be seen through the movements that are staged involving interactions between ceremony participants.

The costumes worn by tor tor dancers are ulos cloth. Ulos is a traditional Batak cloth which colors are generally red, black, and white, added with some decorations made out of gold or silver threads. In the past, the use of ulos was only limited as a scarf, that was only worn in traditional ceremonies. However, as tourist arrivals increase, this cloth is also used as a souvenir.

The tor-tor dance has very simple movements, making it easy to learn. Even those who try it for the first time will immediately be able to play it. This dance movement is limited to the movement of the hands waving up and down simultaneously. Then there is also the stamping of the feet in accordance with the strains of mangondangi or gondang music.

Before the gondang music is played, the hasuhutan or the host will ask the gondang musicians for something. The request was made with courtesy at every opportunity. If one request has been completed and fulfilled, it will be interspersed with gondang beats with a certain rhythm. This is done as a form of blessing from gondang music to all members of the tor tor ceremony.

The song played in the tor-tor dance is a song with the theme of asking God and ancestral spirits so that all family members are given safety, prosperity, happiness, abundance of sustenance, and hope that traditional ceremonies can be a source of sustenance, blessings for family and society.

== See also ==
- Sigale gale
- Tandok dance
- Dance in Indonesia
