= Sinambela =

Batak surname originating in Indonesia

Sinambela is one of Toba Batak clans originating in North Sumatra, Indonesia. People of this clan bear the clan's name as their surname. Notable people of this clan include:

- Si Singamangaraja XII (1845–1907), priest-king of the Batak peoples of north Sumatra
- Mahadi Sinambela (1947–2019), Indonesian politician
