= Huta Raja, Mandailing Natal =

Huta Raja
- Location in North Sumatra and Indonesia Huta Raja (Indonesia)
- Coordinates: 0°36′8.19″N 99°23′27.22″E
- Country: Indonesia
- Province: North Sumatra
- Regency: Mandailing Natal Regency
- District: Ranto Baek District
- Elevation: 1,519 ft (463 m)

Population (2010)
  - Total: 619
- Time zone: UTC+7 (Indonesia Western Standard Time)

Huta Raja is a village in Ranto Baek district, Mandailing Natal Regency in North Sumatra province, Indonesia. Its population is 619.

== Climate ==
Huta Raja has a tropical rainforest climate (Af) with heavy to very heavy rainfall year-round.

Climate data for Huta Raja
Month	Jan	Feb	Mar	Apr	May	Jun	Jul	Aug	Sep	Oct	Nov	Dec	Year
Mean daily maximum °C (°F)	29.8 (85.6)	30.1 (86.2)	30.1 (86.2)	30.0 (86.0)	30.1 (86.2)	29.9 (85.8)	29.6 (85.3)	29.5 (85.1)	29.2 (84.6)	28.9 (84.0)	29.0 (84.2)	29.1 (84.4)	29.6 (85.3)
Daily mean °C (°F)	24.3 (75.7)	24.4 (75.9)	24.6 (76.3)	24.7 (76.5)	24.7 (76.5)	24.3 (75.7)	24.0 (75.2)	24.0 (75.2)	24.0 (75.2)	24.0 (75.2)	24.2 (75.6)	24.0 (75.2)	24.3 (75.7)
Mean daily minimum °C (°F)	18.8 (65.8)	18.7 (65.7)	19.2 (66.6)	19.5 (67.1)	19.4 (66.9)	18.7 (65.7)	18.4 (65.1)	18.5 (65.3)	18.8 (65.8)	19.2 (66.6)	19.4 (66.9)	19.0 (66.2)	19.0 (66.1)
Average precipitation mm (inches)	299 (11.8)	268 (10.6)	398 (15.7)	483 (19.0)	314 (12.4)	263 (10.4)	342 (13.5)	265 (10.4)	430 (16.9)	502 (19.8)	432 (17.0)	430 (16.9)	4,426 (174.4)
Source: Climate-Data.org
