= Pangururan =

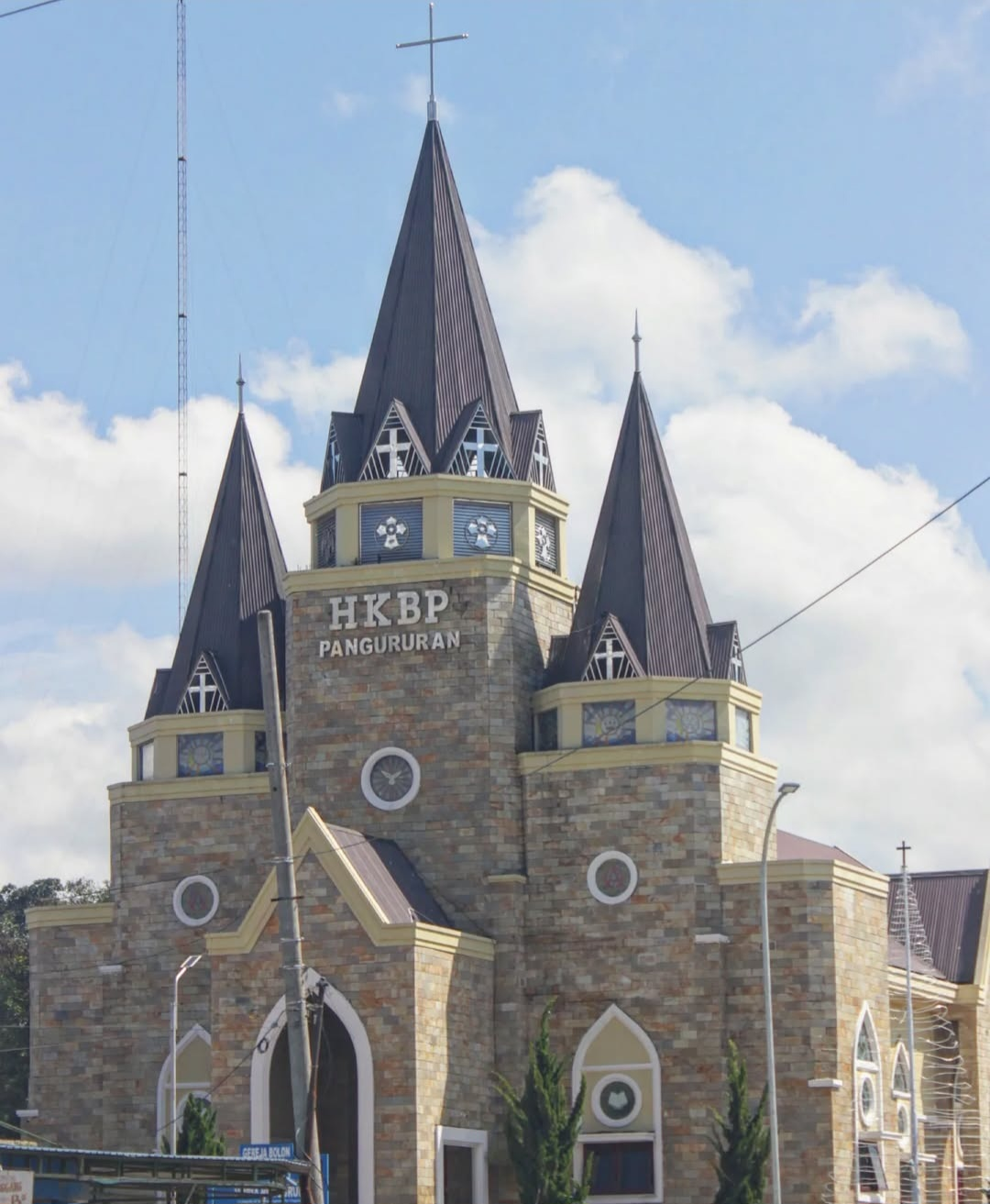
- HKBP Pangururan church in Pangururan town

- Location in North Sumatra and Indonesia Pangururan (Indonesia)
- Coordinates: 2°36′26.8416″N 98°41′45.3588″E
- Country: Indonesia
- Province: North Sumatra
- Regency: Samosir Regency
- District: Pangururan District
- Elevation: 4,062 ft (1,238 m)

Population (mid 2024 estimate)
  - Total: 36,218
- Time zone: UTC+7 (Indonesia Western Standard Time)

Pangururan is a town and a district of the same name in North Sumatra province of Indonesia and it is the seat (capital) of Samosir Regency, and the largest town on Samosir Island. The area of the district is 121.45 km^{2}, and its population at the 2020 Census was 34,209; the official estimate as at mid 2024 was 36,218. The district lies mainly on Samosir Island, but two villages (desa Tanjung Bunga and kelurahan Siogung Ogung) lie on the 'mainland' of Sumatra.

== Climate ==
Pangururan has a cool tropical rainforest climate (Af) due to altitude, with moderate rainfall from June to August and heavy rainfall in the remaining months.

Climate data for Pangururan
Month	Jan	Feb	Mar	Apr	May	Jun	Jul	Aug	Sep	Oct	Nov	Dec	Year
Mean daily maximum °C (°F)	25.2 (77.4)	25.6 (78.1)	25.6 (78.1)	25.5 (77.9)	25.5 (77.9)	25.2 (77.4)	25.0 (77.0)	24.7 (76.5)	24.5 (76.1)	24.2 (75.6)	24.3 (75.7)	24.7 (76.5)	25.0 (77.0)
Daily mean °C (°F)	19.9 (67.8)	20.1 (68.2)	20.2 (68.4)	20.4 (68.7)	20.3 (68.5)	19.9 (67.8)	19.7 (67.5)	19.5 (67.1)	19.6 (67.3)	19.6 (67.3)	19.7 (67.5)	19.8 (67.6)	19.9 (67.8)
Mean daily minimum °C (°F)	14.7 (58.5)	14.6 (58.3)	14.9 (58.8)	15.3 (59.5)	15.2 (59.4)	14.7 (58.5)	14.4 (57.9)	14.4 (57.9)	14.8 (58.6)	15.1 (59.2)	15.2 (59.4)	15.0 (59.0)	14.9 (58.8)
Average precipitation mm (inches)	194 (7.6)	159 (6.3)	209 (8.2)	211 (8.3)	152 (6.0)	95 (3.7)	81 (3.2)	113 (4.4)	180 (7.1)	231 (9.1)	233 (9.2)	223 (8.8)	2,081 (81.9)
Source: Climate-Data.org
