= Samosir Regency =

Regency in North Sumatra, Indonesia

Samosir Regency Kabupaten Samosir
- Regency
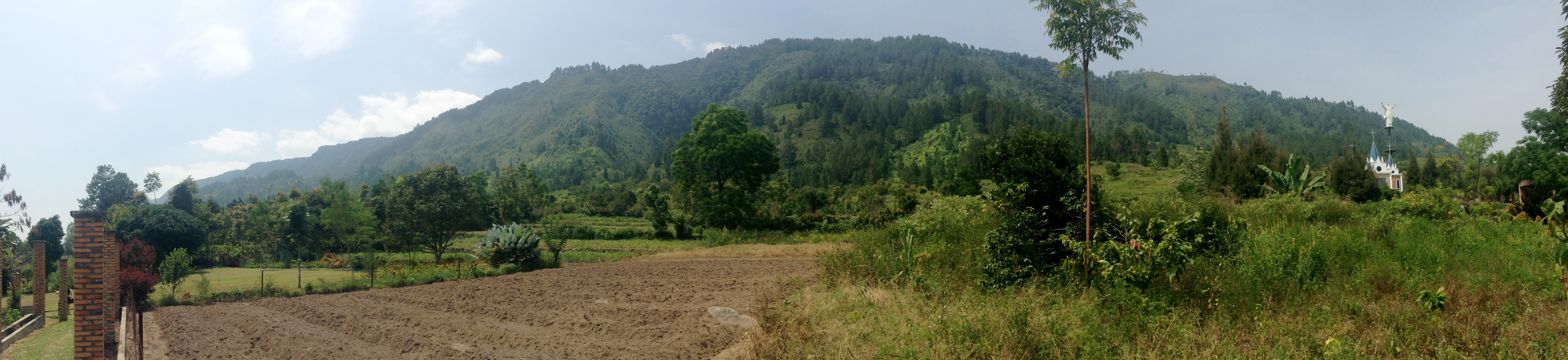
- Panorama of Hills of Samosir Island seen from Bukit Doa Getsemane Sanggam, Ambarita, Simanindo, Samosir Regency

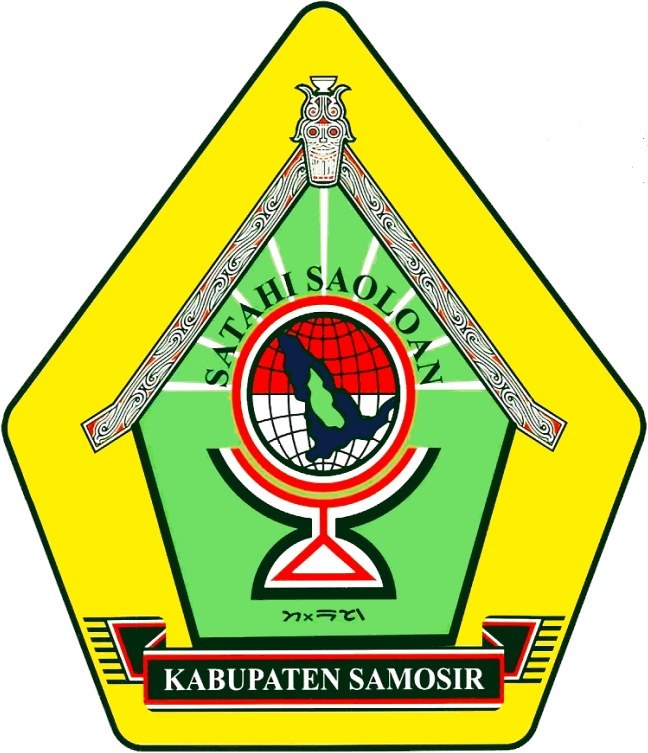
- Seal
- Motto: Satahi Saoloan (Agreed Agreed)
- Country: Indonesia
- Province: North Sumatra
- Regency seat: Pangururan

Government
  - Regent: Vandiko Gultom
  - Vice Regent: Ariston Tua Sidauruk
  - Chairman of Council of Representatives: Saut Martua Tamba (PDI-P)
  - Vice Chairmen of Council of Representatives: Nasib Simbolon (National Awakening Party) and Basrun Sihombing (Nasdem)

Area
  - Total: 1,444.25 km^{2} (557.63 sq mi)

Population (mid 2025 estimate)
  - Total: 144,813
  - Density: 100.269/km^{2} (259.695/sq mi)
- Time zone: UTC+7 (WIB)
- Website: samosirkab.go.id

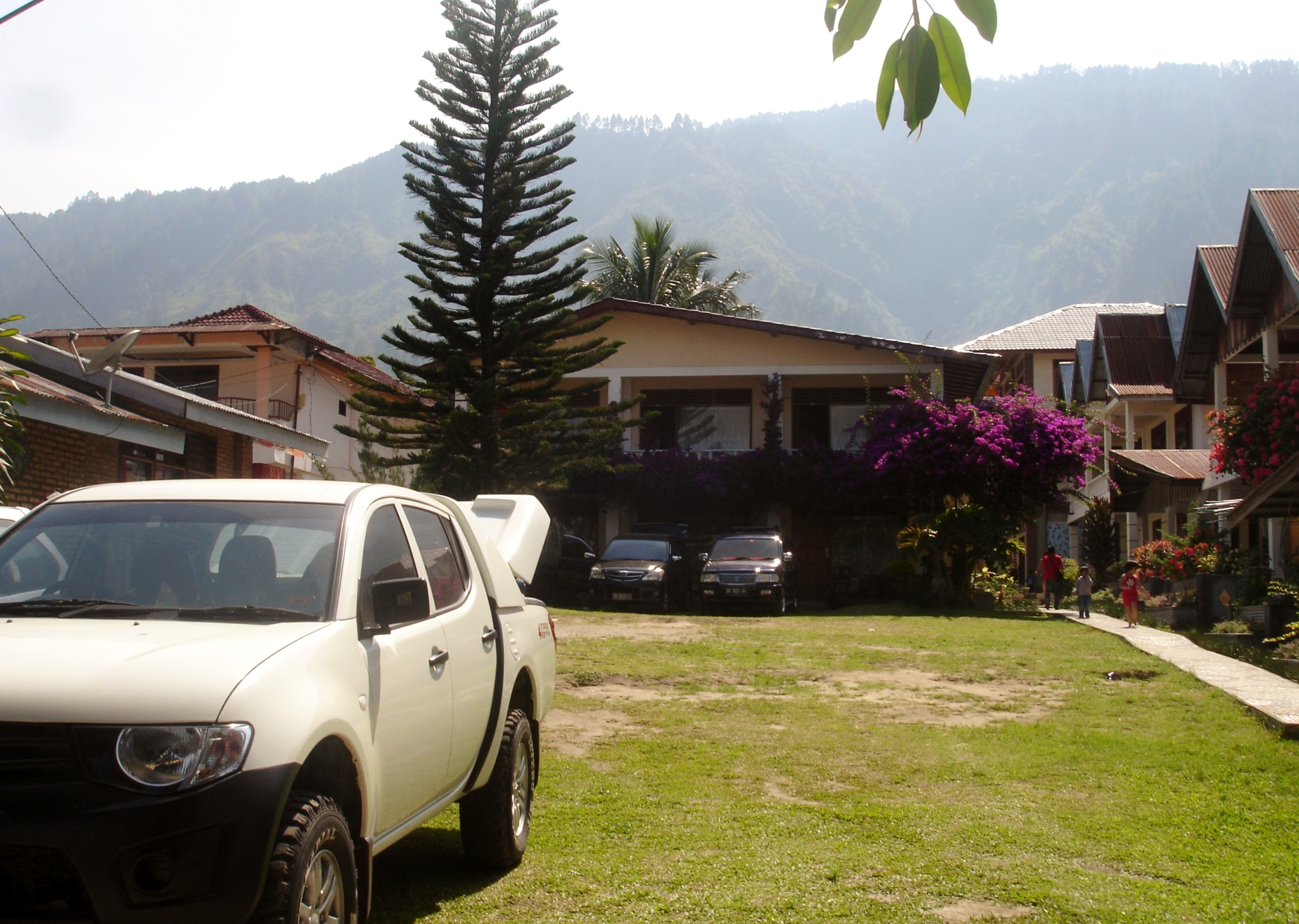
Resort in Ambarita, Samosir Regency

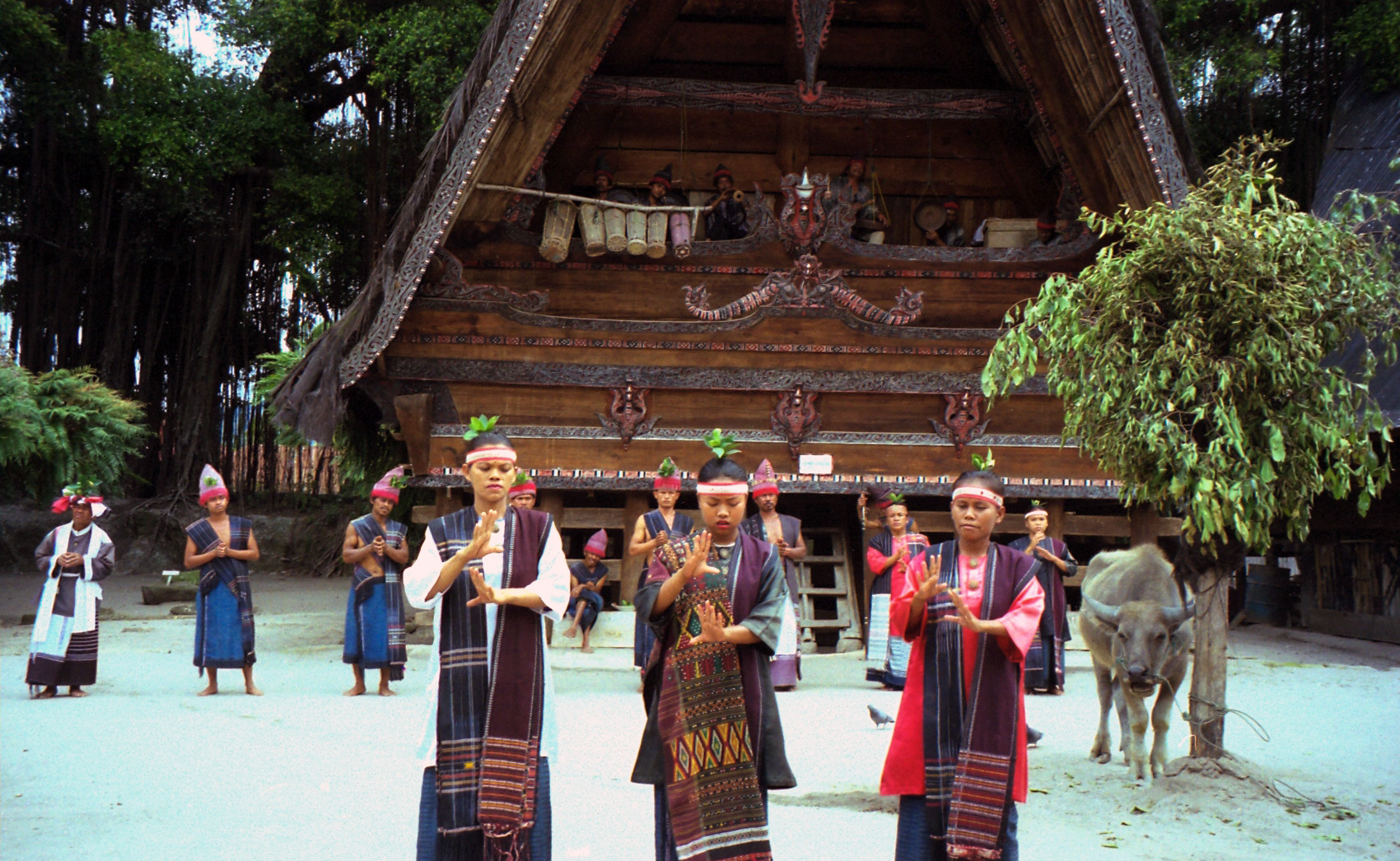
Batak Toba House in Simanindo, Samosir Regency

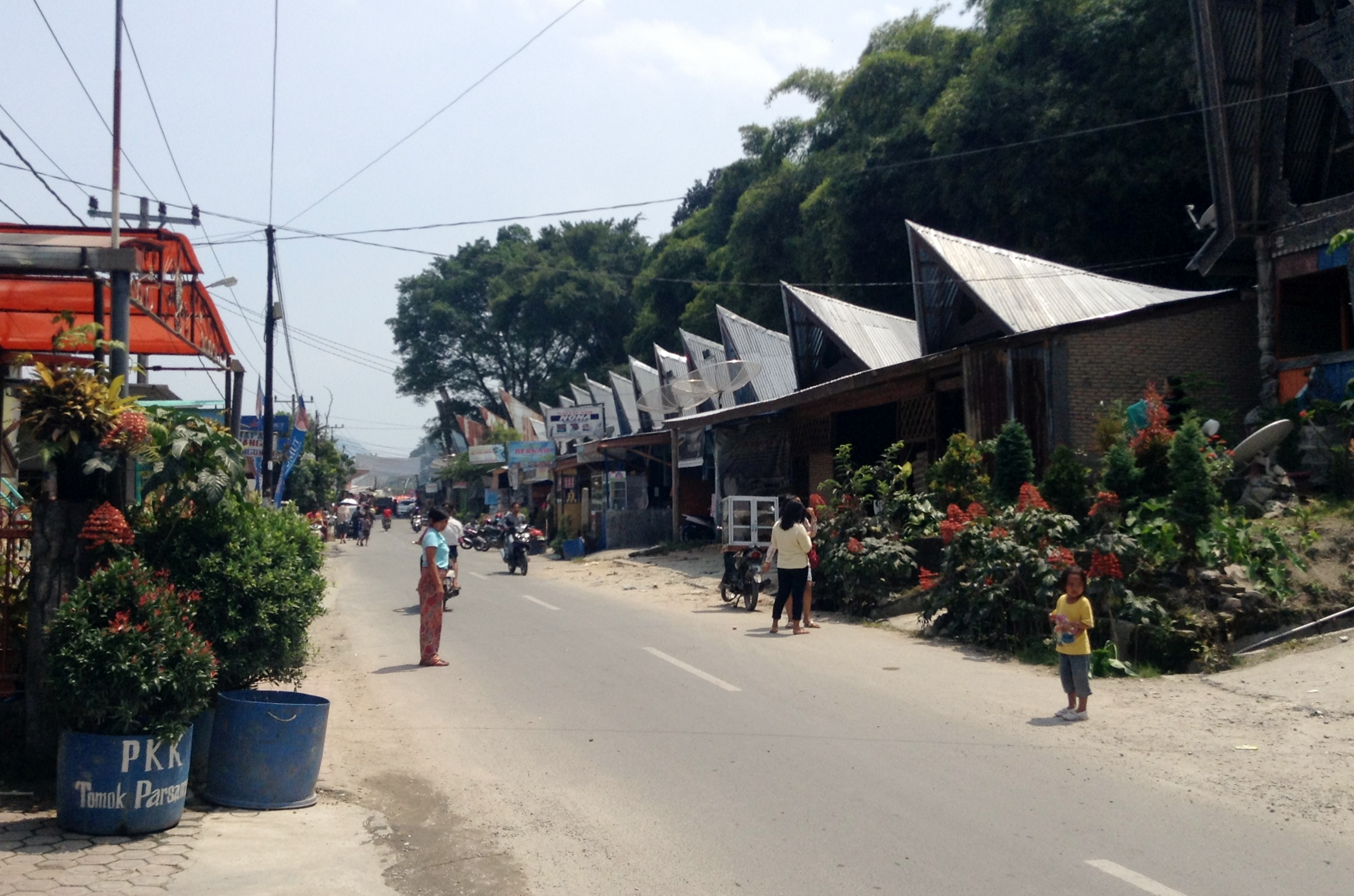
Tomok Market, Samosir Regency

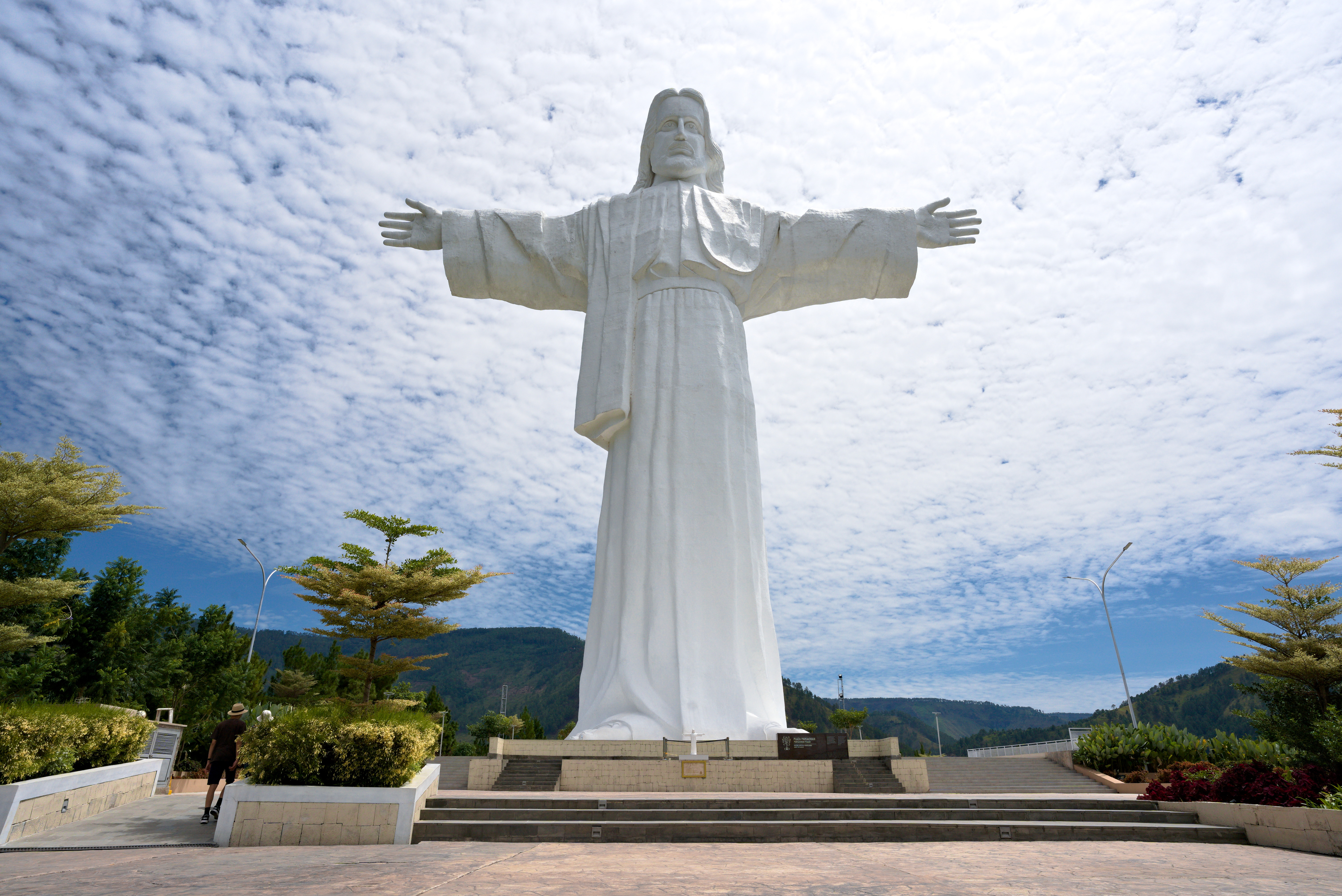
61-meter tall statue of Jesus Christ in Sibeabea, Samosir Regency

Samosir Regency is an inland regency in North Sumatra. It was created on 18 December 2003 by splitting away the western districts of the former Toba Samosir Regency. The regency covers a land area of 1,444.25 square kilometres, including the whole of Samosir Island in the inland sea of Lake Toba. It had a population of 119,653 at the 2010 census and 136,441 at the 2020 Census; the official estimate for mid 2025 was 144,813 (comprising 72,510 males and 72,303 females). Its administrative seat is the town of Pangururan on the west coast of Samosir Island.

== Administrative districts ==
The regency is divided administratively into nine districts (kecamatan), tabulated below with their areas and their populations at the 2010 Census and the 2020 Census, together with the official estimates as of mid 2025. The table also includes the locations of the district administrative centers, the number of administrative villages in each district (128 rural desa and 6 urban kelurahan), and its postcode.

Kode Wilayah	Name of District (kecamatan)	Area in km^{2}	Pop'n Census 2010	Pop'n Census 2020	Pop'n Estimate mid 2025	Admin centre	No. of villages	Post code
12.17.06	Sianjur Mula Mula ^{(a)}	140.24	9,138	10,003	10,486	Ginolat	12	22396
12.17.05	Harian	560.45	7,860	9,397	9,885	Harian Boho	13	22391
12.17.09	Sitiotio	50.76	7,124	8,172	8,524	Sabulan	8	22397
12.17.02	Onan Runggu	60.89	10,329	11,122	11,625	Onan Runggu	12	22398
12.17.03	Nainggolan	87.86	11,849	12,871	13,593	Nainggolan	15 ^{(b)}	22394
12.17.04	Palipi	129.55	16,087	18,209	19,304	Mogang	17	22393
12.17.07	Ronggur Nihuta	94.87	8,356	9,692	10,150	Ronggur Nihuta	8	22392
12.17.08	Pangururan	121.45	29,412	34,209	36,746	Pasar Pangururan	28 ^{(c)}	22390
12.17.01	Simanindo ^{(d)}	198.20	19,498	22,766	24,500	Ambarita	21 ^{(e)}	22395
	Totals	1,444.25	119,653	136,441	144,813	Pangururan	134	

Notes: (a) includes the small island of Tulas (Pulau Tulas) in Lake Toba. (b) including the 2 kelurahan of Parhusip III and Siruma Hombar. (c) including the 3 kelurahan of Pasar Pangururan, Pintu Sona and Siogung Ogung. (d) includes the small islands of Pulau Tolping, Pulau Malau Satu, and Pulau Malau Dua in Lake Toba. (e) including the kelurahan of Tuktuk Siadong.

Six of the nine districts (kecamatan) within the regency are on the island of Samosir (which lies within Lake Toba), while the others lie on the 'mainland' of Sumatra.

- Samosir Island districts
  - Onan Runggu
  - Palipi
  - Pangururan
  - Ronggur Nihuta
  - Simanindo
  - Nainggolan
- Mainland districts
  - Sitiotio
  - Harian
  - Sianjur Mula Mula

However, a small part of Pangururan District (the two villages of Desa Tanjung Bunga and kelurahan Siogung Ogung, with a combined area of 10.50 km^{2} and a population of 3,222 at the 2020 Census) lies on the 'mainland', cut off from the rest of the district by the canal.

== Botanical Garden ==
2011: Samosir Regency with supervision from LIPI will build a 100-hectare Botanical Garden. It will finish 10 years later with a cost predicted about Rp.73 billion ($8.6 million).

== Geo park ==
A geopark worth Rp20 billion ($2.2 million) is expected to be created - beginning in mid-2012 - in cooperation with the Agency for the Assessment and Application of Technology (BPPT). It has been proposed for incorporation into the world geopark network.

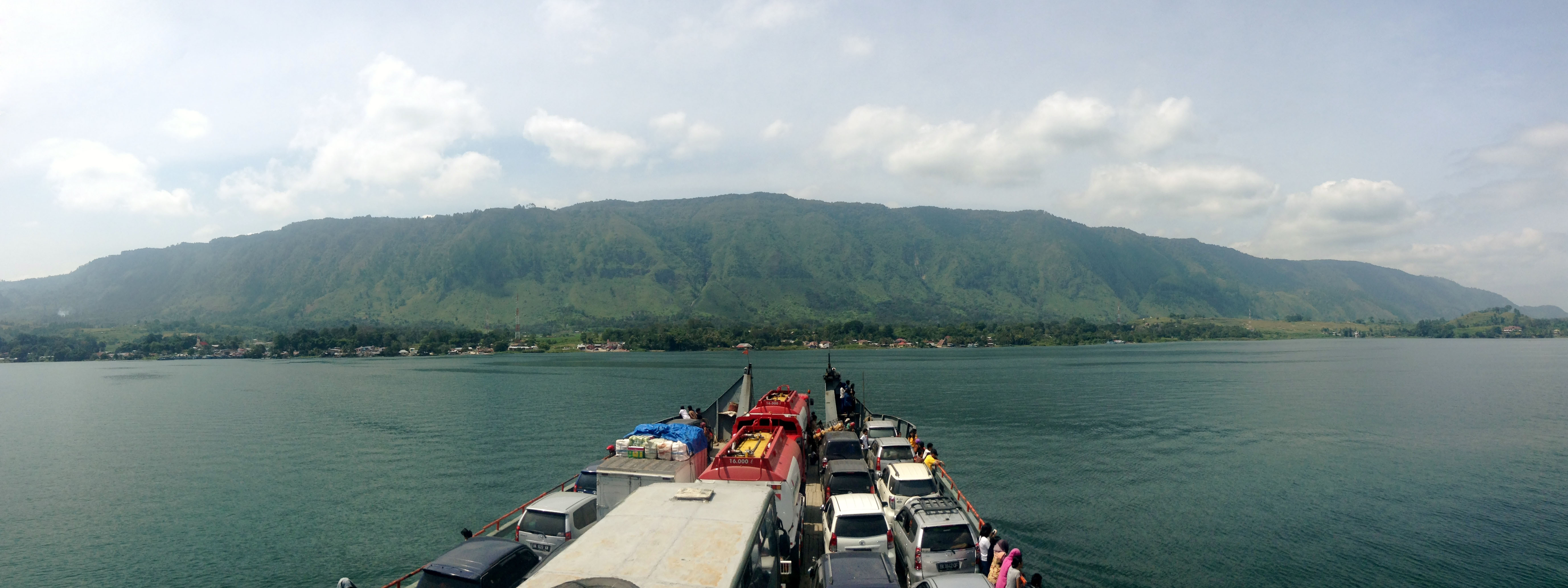
Panoramic view of Samosir Island from Lake Toba
