= Toba Regency =

Regency in North Sumatra, Indonesia

Coordinates: 2.3979°N 99.2168°E

Toba Regency Kabupaten Toba
- Regency
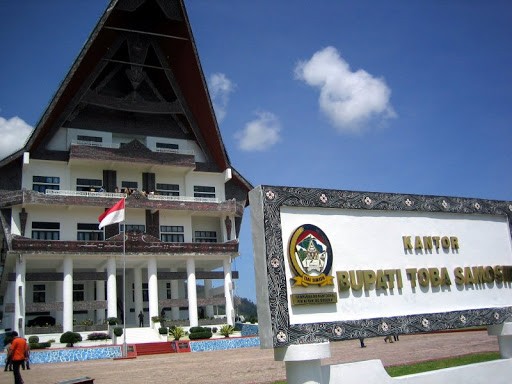
- Office building of Toba Regency

- Seal
- Motto: "Tampakna do Rantosna, Rim ni Tahi do Gogona" ("If together in one spirit and purpose, then everything could be achieved.")
- Country: Indonesia
- Province: North Sumatra
- Regency seat: Balige

Government
  - Regent: Effendi Sintong Panangian Napitupulu
  - Vice Regent: Audi Murphy Sitorus
  - Chairman of Council of Representatives: Effendi S. Panangian Napitupulu (Golkar)
  - Vice Chairmen of Council of Representatives: Candrow Manurung (Nasdem) and Mangatas Silaen (PDI-P)

Area
  - Total: 2,021.8 km^{2} (780.6 sq mi)

Population (mid 2025 estimate)
  - Total: 219,580
  - Density: 108.61/km^{2} (281.29/sq mi)
- Time zone: UTC+7 (WIB)
- Website: tobasamosirkab.go.id

Toba Regency is a landlocked regency in North Sumatra. Its seat is Balige. The regency covers an area of 2,021.8 square kilometres; it had a population of 173,129 at the 2010 census and 206,199 at the 2020 Census; the official estimate as of mid 2025 was 219,580 (comprising 109,884 males and 109,696 females). Although landlocked, the regency includes the eastern shore of the vast inland Lake Toba.

The regency was originally created on 23 November 1998 from the northern districts of North Tapanuli Regency, and was formerly known as Toba Samosir Regency, even after its western part was split off as Samosir Regency on 18 December 2003 (apart from Muara District, which remained part of North Tapanuli), until the residual regency's name was officially shortened in 2020.

== Administrative districts ==
The regency is divided administratively into sixteen districts (kecamatan), tabulated below with their areas and their populations at the 2010 Census and the 2020 Census, together with the official estimates as of mid 2025. The table also includes the locations of the district administrative centres, the number of administrative villages in each district (231 rural desa and 13 urban kelurahan), and its post code:

Kode Wilayah	Name of District (kecamatan)	Area in km^{2}	Pop'n Census 2010	Pop'n Census 2020	Pop'n Estimate mid 2025	Admin centre	No. of Villages	Post code
12.12.01	Balige	91.05	36,653	44,635	47,999	Balige	35 ^{(a)}	22311 -22316
12.12.22	Tampahan	24.45	4,290	5,141	5,486	Gurgur	6	22312
12.12.02	Laguboti	73.90	18,359	22,397	24,107	Laguboti	23 ^{(b)}	22381
12.12.04	Habinsaran	408.70	15,453	17,869	18,741	Parsoburan	22 ^{(c)}	22383
12.12.06	Borbor	176.65	6,790	8,299	8,941	Borbor	15	22383
12.12.21	Nassau	335.50	7,219	9,173	10,070	Lumban Rau; Tengah	10	22383
12.12.03	Silaen	172.58	12,105	14,143	14,908	Silaen	23	22382
12.12.19	Sigumpar	25.20	7,404	8,599	9,038	Sigumpar	10 ^{(d)}	22380
12.12.07	Porsea	37.88	12,810	14,669	15,045	Porsea	17 ^{(e)}	22384
12.12.05	Pintu Pohan; Meranti	277.27	7,070	7,346	7,522	Pintu Pohan	7	22384
12.12.20	Siantar; Narumonda	22.20	5,714	7,435	8,153	Narumonda I	14	22384
12.12.24	Parmaksian	45.98	10,275	11,556	11,823	Pangombusan	11	22384
12.12.09	Lumban Julu	90.90	8,150	9,953	10,718	Lumban Julu	12	22388
12.12.10	Uluan	109.00	6,983	9,680	9,968	Lumban; Binanga	17	22385
12.12.08	Ajibata	52.80	7,221	9,420	10,473	Pardamean; Ajibata	10 ^{(f)}	22386
12.12.23	Bonatua; Lunasi	57.74	6,632	5,884	6,588	Lumban Lubu	12	22387
	Totals	2,021.80	173,129	206,199	219,580	Balige	244	

Notes: (a) comprising 6 kelurahan (Balige I, Balige III, Lumban Dolok Haumabange, Napitupulu Bagasan, Pardede Onan and Sangkar Nihuta) and 29 desa. (b) including the kelurahan of Pasar Laguboti.
(c) including the kelurahan of Parsoburan Tengah. (d) including the kelurahan of Sigumpar Dangsina.
(e) comprising 3 kelurahan (Parparean III, Pasar Porsea and Patane III) and 14 desa. (f) including the kelurahan of Parsaoran Ajibata.

== Orchid Paradise ==
Two scientists explored the Eden Park tourist forest in Sionggang village in Toba Regency for four years and have successfully identified almost 200 new species of forest orchids. The area is an orchid paradise, in which thousands of other orchid species can be found.

== Sigura-Gura waterfall ==
Sigura-gura waterfall, which is the highest waterfall in Indonesia at 250 metres (820 ft) tall, is located 250 kilometres (160 mi) from Medan or a 2 to 3 hour long drive. Below the waterfall, one can do White water rafting.
