= Balige =

Town in North Sumatra, Indonesia

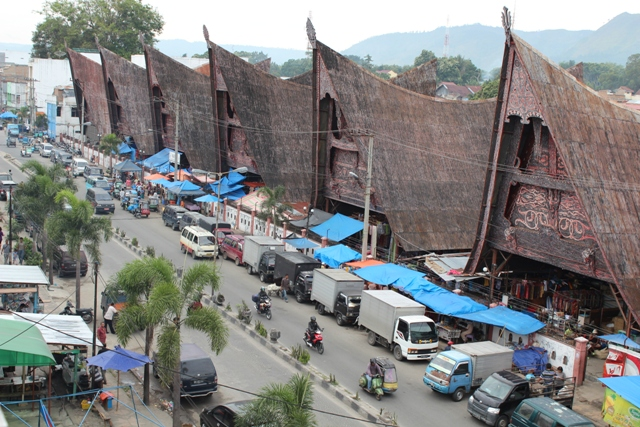
A main road in Balige

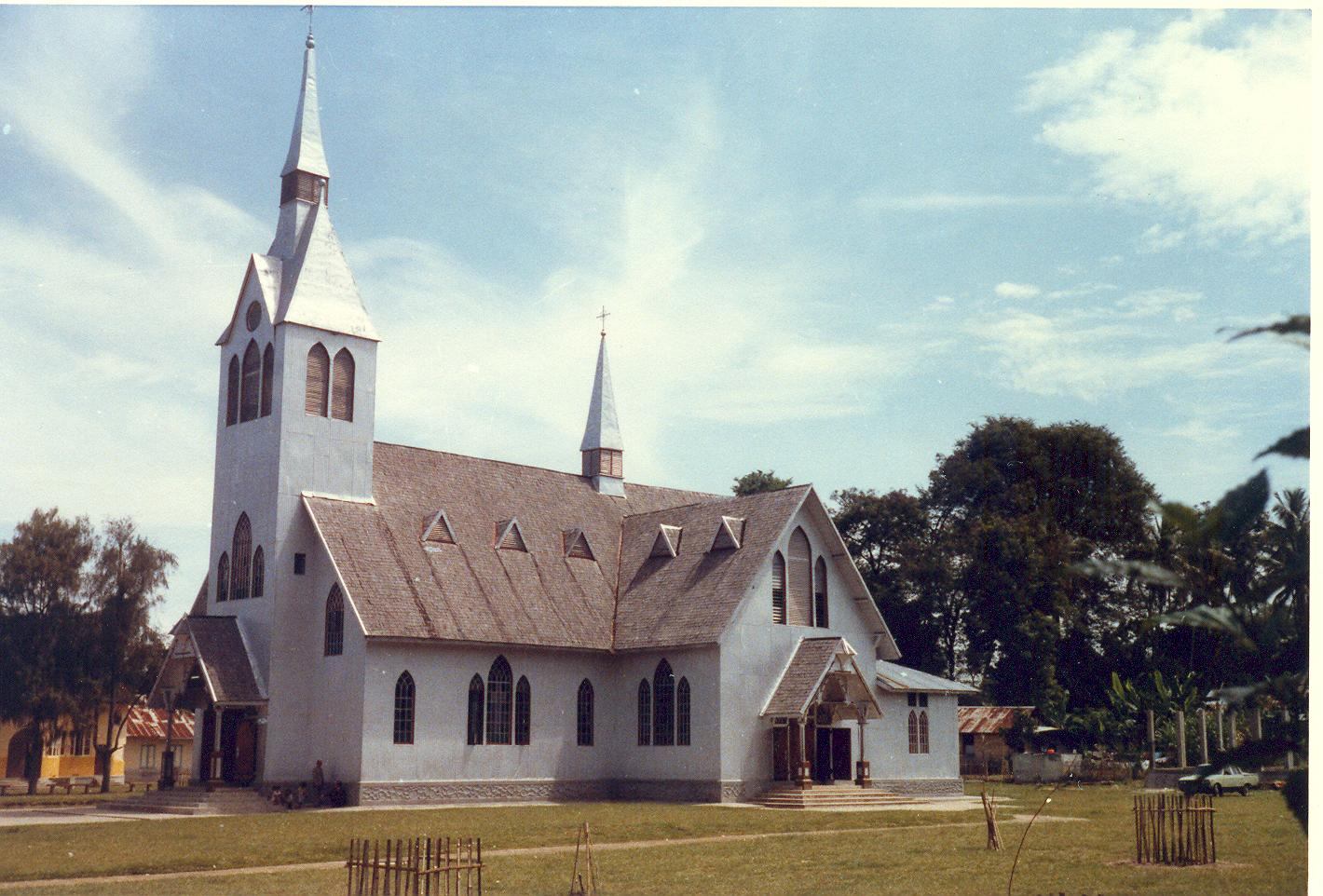
Protestant Christian Batak Church, Balige Parish (ressort)

Balige is a town in North Sumatra province of Indonesia and it is the seat (capital) of Toba Regency. It is 240 kilometers away from Medan. It had 47,284 inhabitants as at mid 2024. Balige is also a tourist spot to see Lake Toba, the largest crater lake in the world. Balige is 60 kilometers away from Parapat, another important town on Lake Toba.

== Climate ==
Balige has an elevation moderated tropical rainforest climate (Af) with moderate rainfall from June to August and heavy rainfall in the remaining months.

Climate data for Balige
Month	Jan	Feb	Mar	Apr	May	Jun	Jul	Aug	Sep	Oct	Nov	Dec	Year
Mean daily maximum °C (°F)	26.6 (79.9)	26.9 (80.4)	27.0 (80.6)	26.9 (80.4)	27.0 (80.6)	26.8 (80.2)	26.5 (79.7)	26.3 (79.3)	26.0 (78.8)	25.7 (78.3)	25.7 (78.3)	26.1 (79.0)	26.5 (79.6)
Daily mean °C (°F)	21.3 (70.3)	21.5 (70.7)	21.7 (71.1)	21.8 (71.2)	21.9 (71.4)	21.6 (70.9)	21.2 (70.2)	21.2 (70.2)	21.2 (70.2)	21.2 (70.2)	21.2 (70.2)	21.3 (70.3)	21.4 (70.6)
Mean daily minimum °C (°F)	16.1 (61.0)	16.1 (61.0)	16.4 (61.5)	16.8 (62.2)	16.8 (62.2)	16.4 (61.5)	16.0 (60.8)	16.1 (61.0)	16.4 (61.5)	16.7 (62.1)	16.7 (62.1)	16.5 (61.7)	16.4 (61.6)
Average rainfall mm (inches)	186 (7.3)	153 (6.0)	200 (7.9)	217 (8.5)	163 (6.4)	121 (4.8)	107 (4.2)	114 (4.5)	193 (7.6)	252 (9.9)	247 (9.7)	243 (9.6)	2,196 (86.4)
Source: Climate-Data.org
