= Merdeka, Karo Regency =

Coordinates: 3°58′57″N 98°59′59″E

Merdeka is a district of Karo Regency in North Sumatra.

There are nine desa within Merdeka District. Population listed as of 2007:

- Merdeka (capital), 1,820
- Gongsol, 1,715
- Cinta Rayat, 2,592
- Sada Perarih, 1,217
- Jaranguda, 2,230
- Semangat, 935
- Semangat Gunung, 588
- Ujung Teran, 812
- Deram, 488

Total population (2009) is 13,218. 100% of the population are Indonesian citizens. 94% of primary-aged children were in school. There are 5 government primary schools and 1 private primary school. There are no middle schools or high schools within the subdistrict. There are 11 mosques and 16 churches in Merdeka district.

80% of households are 'agricultural'. See Simpang Empat, Karo Regency for details on agricultural production. Industrial production in Merdeka is through cottage industry.

It borders Naman Teran to the west, Simpang Empat to the south, Berastagi to the east, and Deli Serdang to the north. It was split from Simpang Empat, Karo Regency on 29 December 2006, along with Naman Teran.

The government office in Merdeka is 20km from the local government in Kabanjahe, and 97km from Medan, the regional government. Nearly all the roads in Merdeka are paved.

Its elevation is 700–1420 metres, and the area is 44.17 square kilometres.
