= Mardingding subdistrict =

Coordinates: 2°5′N 97°55′E

Mardingding is an isolated district of Karo Regency in North Sumatra. It lies 95 kilometres by broken road from Kabanjahe, the administrative centre of the Regency. The condition of the roads are so poor that some residents have planted bananas and cassava in the roads.

It is not to be confused with Lake Mardingding, or Mardinding village, in Tiganderket District.

Mardinding district borders Babul Makmur, Southeast Aceh Regency to the west, Langkat Regency to the north, and Tigabinanga District to the east.

There are twelve desa within Mardingding District:

- Lau Solu, pop. 1,739 (2020 Census)
- Kuta Pengkih, pop. 2,103
- Rimo Bunga, pop. 328
- Lau Mulgap, pop. 1,300
- Tanjung Pamah, pop. 907
- Mardingding (capital), pop. 3,941 (6,208 inclusive of Lau Gurut and Bukit Makmur)
- Lau Kusumpat, pop. 1,348
- Bandar Purba, pop. 1,098
- Lau Pengulu, pop. 1,071
- Lau Pakam, pop. 3,852
- Lau Garut, pop. 1,424
- Bukit Makmur, pop. 843

Lau Pakam is on the border with Aceh, and lies 40 km from Kutacane.

The total population at the 2020 Census was 19,954, with a population density of 74.7 people/square kilometre. In 2007 there were 4,583 homes. 100% of the population were Indonesian citizens. Religious affiliations in 2007: 3,849 Muslims, 3,729 Catholics, 7,873 Protestants, 137 Hindus or Buddhists, 305 others. There are 8 mosques, 3 mushollas, 69 churches and 1 temple.

In 2007, 94% of primary school age children were attending school, and 89% of high school age children. 73% of the population work in agriculture. The major crop was maize, with 14,671 hectares cultivated, and also rice, with 3,097 hectares wet rice and 585 hectares dry rice cultivated. In addition, 2,354 hectares of candlenut, and 635 hectares of cocoa were cultivated. Only a few, cottage, industries operate in Mardingding.

There are 19 junior schools, 3 middle schools, and 0 high schools in Mardingding District.

The district is situated 280 metres above sea level and has an area of 267.11 square kilometres. The population by mid 2023 had grown to 20,812.
