= Simpang Empat, Karo Regency =

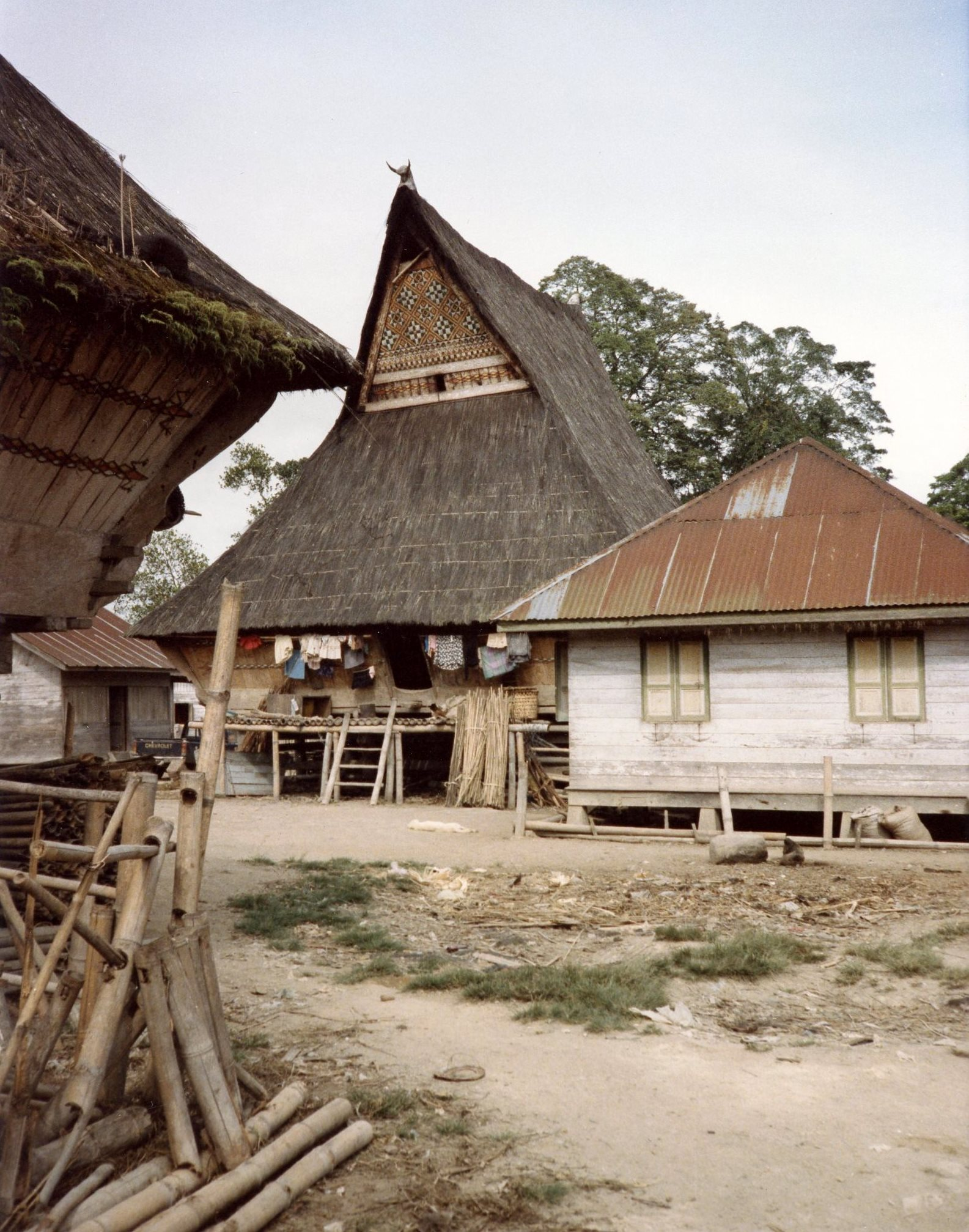
Traditional houses in Lingga village, Simpang Empat, 1985

Simpang Empat is a district of Karo Regency in North Sumatra.

It borders Kabanjahe and Berastagi districts to the east, Payung to the west, Naman Teran and Merdeka to the north and Kabanjahe district to the south.

Prior to independence, Simpang Empat was ruled by the Karo king Sibayak of Lingga, whose domain consisted of the subkingdoms of Sitelu (ruled by a king of marga Karo-Karo), Tigapancur (ruled by a king of marga Sembiring Gurukinayan), and Siempat Teran (ruled by the king of marga Karo-Karo Sitepu). The district is called Simpang Empat because the government building was constructed at the intersection (Simpang) where the three kings once met.

In 2006, Simpang Empat was split into Simpang Empat, Merdeka, and Naman Teran districts. The leader of the government since 2005 has been Dr. Lesta Karo-Karo.

Elevation is 700–1420 metres, and the area of the district is 93.48 square kilometres. The district government office is 7.5 km from the Regency government office in Kabanjahe.

List of desa with population (2007):

- Beganding, 1,540
- Serumbia, 583
- Nang Belawan, 956
- Lingga, 3,262
- Lingga Julu, 1,642
- Ndokum Siroga (capital), 1,667
- Surbakti, 2,393
- Tiga Pancur, 954
- Berastepu, 2,247
- Pintu Besi, 253
- Jeraya, 563
- Perteguhen, 853
- Kuta Tengah, 558
- Torong, 110
- Gajah, 1,541
- Bulan Baru, 516
- Gamber, 510

100% of the population of Simpang Empat are of Indonesian citizenship.

There are 14 junior schools, 2 middle schools, and 1 high school (SMA Negeri Simpang Empat, in Berastepu) in Simpang Empat. 93% of primary-aged children were in primary school.

There are 13 mosques, 1 musholla, and 32 churches in Simpang Empat.

Being in the drier highlands, only ladang (dry rice) production is used, and 1,700 hectares were so-cultivated, along with 2,485 hectares of maize. Other agricultural products include coffee beans, chili, potatoes, cabbage, chinese cabbage, tomatoes and carrots. There are 3 light industries in Simpang Empat, as well as numerous cottage industry. Most of the district's roads are tarmac or hard roads, but there are also some unpaved roads in a few areas.
