= Sipisopiso =

Sipiso-piso Waterfall
- Sipiso-piso
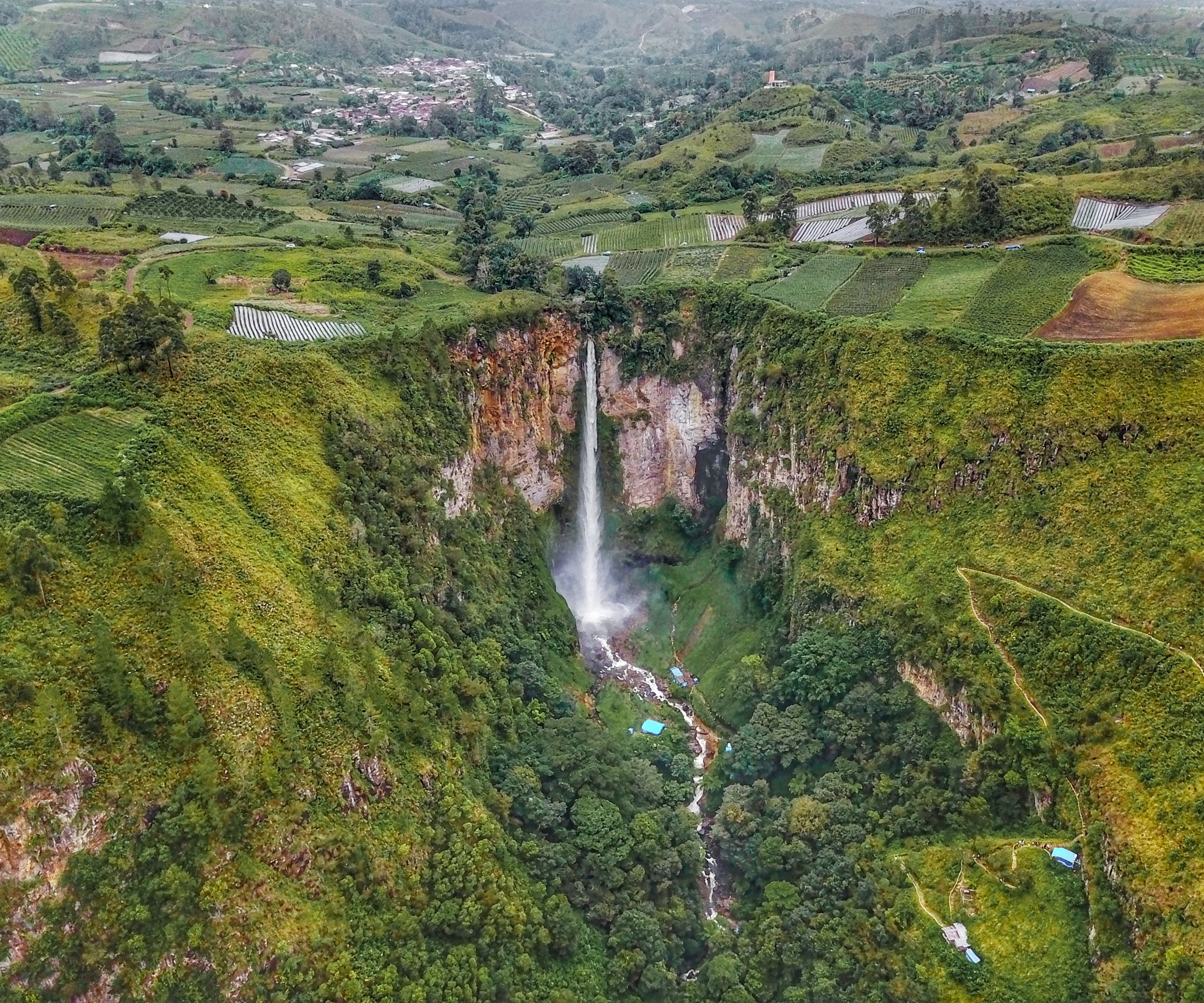
- Sipiso-piso waterfall drops from an opening on the rock face to the bottom
- Interactive map of Sipiso-piso Waterfall
- Location: Tanah Karo Regency, North Sumatra, Indonesia
- Coordinates: 2°54′59″N 98°31′11″E
- Type: Plunge
- Total height: 120 metres (390 ft)
- Watercourse: Pajanabolon River

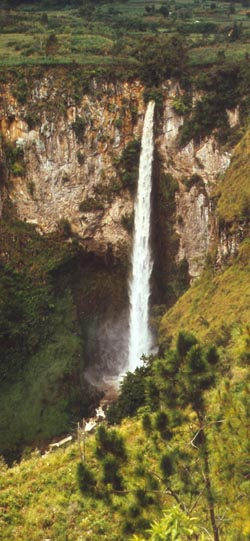
The Sipiso-piso waterfall seen from the eastern rim of the Lake Toba crater, Sumatra

The Sipiso-piso is a plunge waterfall in the Batak highlands of Sumatra, Indonesia. It is formed by a small underground river of the Karo plateau that falls from a cave in the side of caldera of Lake Toba, some 120 metres (390 ft) down to lake level. Sipiso-piso is a well-known tourist attraction and a nearby vantage point offers views of the falls and lake. There are 651 steps between the bottom of the waterfall and the main entrance.

Sipiso-piso waterfall is located in the Tanah Karo regency in North Sumatra, at the northernmost tip of the Lake Toba caldera, near the fishing village of Tongging. The closest municipality is the town of Kabanjahe, about 25 km (16 mi) away.

== See also ==
- List of waterfalls
