= Barusjahe =

District in Indonesia

Coordinates: 3°10′N 98°53′E

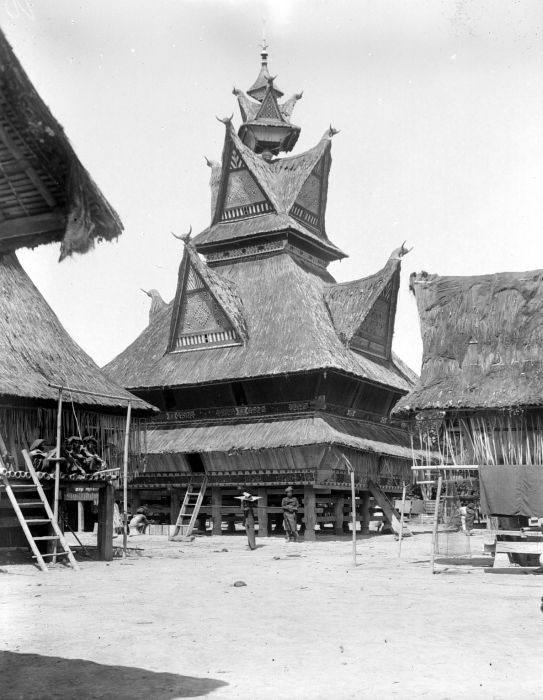
Old Karo traditional house in Barusjahe

Barusjahe is a district and village of Karo Regency.

It is a major production centre for growing oranges, and for cut flowers.

It is located in the east of Karo regency, bordering Merek District to the south, Simalungun Regency to the southeast, and Deli Serdang Regency to the north east. To the west is Tigapanah District. It is 16km from Kabanjahe, and 101 km from Medan.

It is located 1200 metres above sea level, and it has an area of 128.04 square kilometres.

There are 19 desa within Barusjahe District. The capital of the District is Barusjahe town, which had a population of 1,669 as of 2020. The total population of the district at the 2020 Census was 24,656.

99% of primary-aged children attended school, and 94% of high-school-aged children did.

The district is mostly Christian, being 2,274 Muslims, 7,621 Catholics, and 15,103 Protestants, as of the 2020 Census.

Besides oranges, by far the most important crop, there is dry(ladang) and wet (sawah) rice production. There is also coffee, cloves, chili, cabbage, pineapples, and green beans production. There is no major industry in Barusjahe. The roads vary between paved and dirt roads.
