= Naman Teran =

Naman Teran is a district of Karo Regency in North Sumatra, Indonesia.

It borders Deli Serdang Regency to the north, Langkat Regency to the northwest, Tiganderket district to the west and southwest, Payung to the south, Simpang Empat to the southeast, and Merdeka to the east. It was split from Simpang Empat, Karo Regency on 29 December 2006, along with Merdeka.

The government office in Naman Teran is 20 km from the local government in Kabanjahe, and 97 km from Medan, the regional government. Nearly all the roads in Merdeka are paved.

Its elevation is 700–1420 metres, and the area is 87.82 square kilometres.

There are 14 desa within Naman Teran District:. Population listed as of 2007:

- Kuta Gugung, 974
- Sigarang-garang, 1,394
- Bekerah, 357
- Simacem, 452
- Sukanalu, 981
- Kuta Tonggal, 332
- Sukandebi, 947
- Naman (capital), 1,538
- Sukatepu, 483
- Ndeskati, 734
- Kuta Mbelin, 1,019
- Gung Pinto, 507
- Kebayaken, 425
- Kuta Rayat, 1,773

Total population (2009) is 12,652. 100% of the population are of Indonesian citizenship.

93% of primary-aged children are in school. There are 11 primary schools, 2 middle schools, and 0 high schools within the subdistrict.

There is limited sawah(wet rice) and more extensive ladang (dry rice) production. See also Simpang Empat for agricultural production details.
