= Mount Sinabung =

Active volcano in North Sumatra, Indonesia

- Gunung Sinabung (Indonesian) ᯑᯩᯞᯩᯰ ᯘᯫᯉᯆᯬᯰ, Deleng Sinabung (Batak Karo)
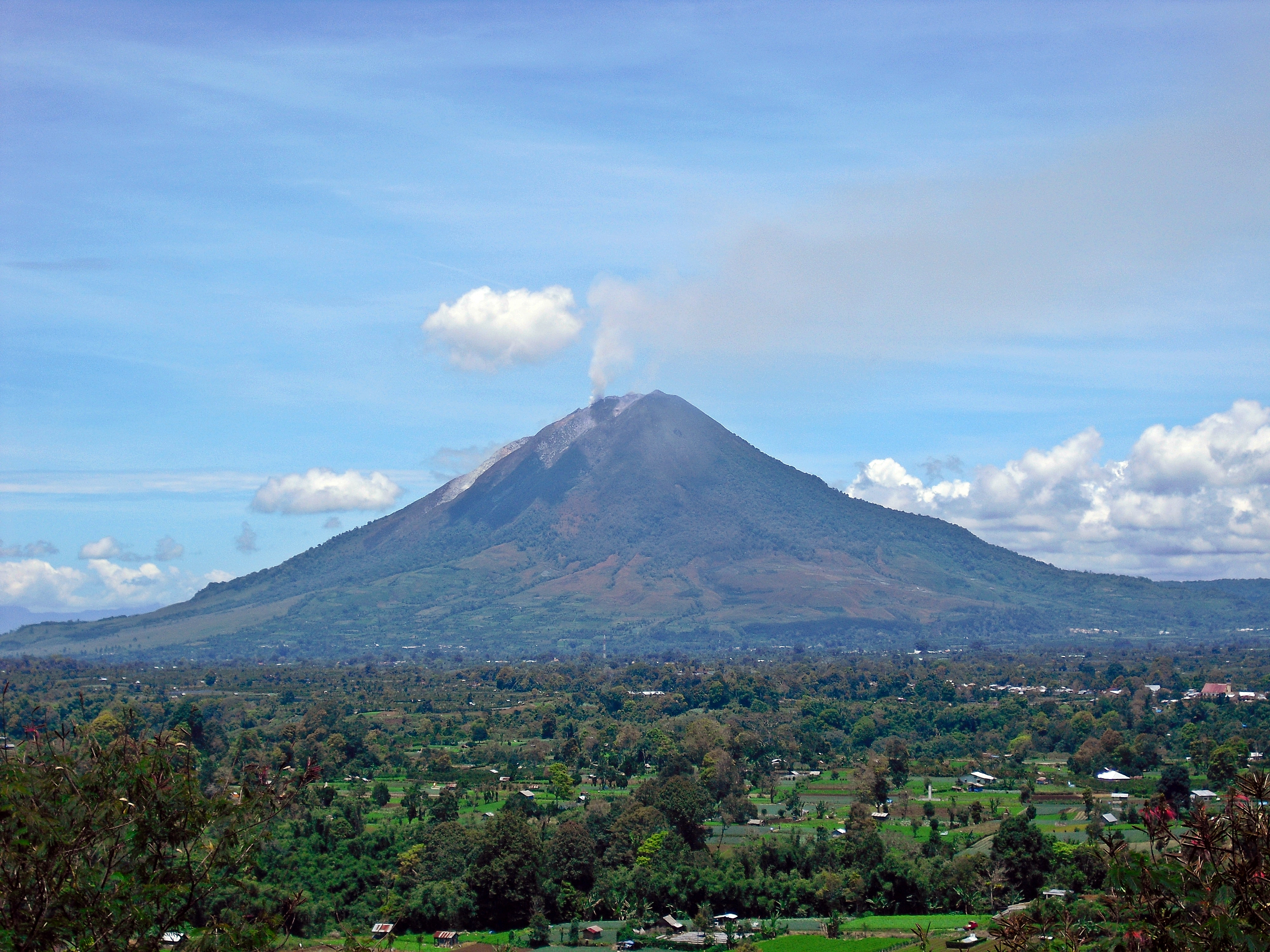
- Sinabung in 2010

Highest point
- Elevation: 2,460 m (8,070 ft)
- Listing: Ribu
- Coordinates: 3°10′12″N 98°23′31″E

Geography
- Location within Northern Sumatra
- Location: Sumatra, Indonesia

Geology
- Rock age: Pleistocene
- Mountain type: Stratovolcano
- Volcanic arc: Sunda Arc
- Last eruption: 2026

Mount Sinabung (Indonesian: Gunung Sinabung; Batak Karo: ᯑᯩᯞᯩᯰ ᯘᯫᯉᯆᯬᯰ, Deleng Sinabung) is an active stratovolcano consisting of andesite and dacite in the Karo plateau of Karo Regency, North Sumatra, Indonesia, 40 kilometres (25 mi) from Lake Toba. Many old lava flows are on its flanks and the last known eruption, before recent times, occurred 1200 years before present, between 740 - 880 CE. Solfataric activities (cracks where steam, gas, and lava are emitted) were last observed at the summit in 1912; recent documented events include an eruption in the early hours of 29 August 2010 and eruptions in September and November 2013, January, February and October 2014. The volcano has recently claimed the life of at least 23 people in a number of events since 2014. Between 2013 and 2014, the alert for a major event was increased with no significant activity. On 2 June 2015, the alert was again increased, and on 26 June 2015, at least 10,000 people were evacuated, fearing a major eruption. The long eruption of Mount Sinabung is similar to that of Mount Unzen in Japan, which erupted for five years after lying dormant for 400 years. A major eruption began on 10 August 2020.

== Geology ==
Mount Sinabung is a Pleistocene-to-Holocene stratovolcano. It is located in a relatively cool area on a fertile plateau with mountains bounding the north. The summit crater of the volcano has a complex, longer form due to vents migrating on the N-S line. The 2,460-meter-high (8,070 ft) andesitic-to-dacitic volcano comes from the Sunda Arc, which is created by the subduction of the Indo-Australian Plate under the Eurasian Plate. The Andaman Islands are on the North-Northwest bound of the arc while the Banda Arc is on the East. Sinabung has a total of four volcanic craters, one of them being active currently.

== Eruptions ==
Mount Sinabung erupted after a 400-year-long hiatus in August 2010, and has been continuously active since September 2013. Total erupted volume from 2010 to the end of 2015 was estimated at 0.16 km^{3} dense-rock equivalent.

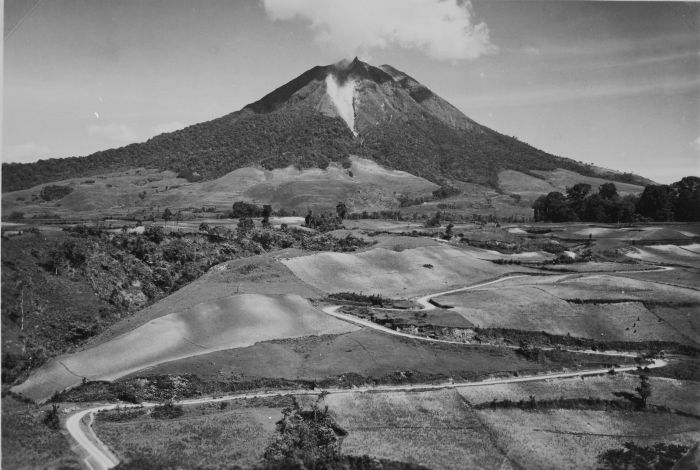
Mount Sinabung in 1940s

On Friday 3 September 2010, two more eruptions were noted. The first one happened at 4:45 a.m., local time, forcing more villagers to leave their houses – some of them had just returned the day before. This eruption was the most intense so far, with ash spewed up into the atmosphere about 3.0 kilometres (1.9 mi) high. The sound was heard from 8 kilometres away. Some hours before the eruption a warning had been issued through the volcanology agency, and most villagers were prepared to leave quickly. A second eruption occurred the same evening, around 6 p.m. The eruption came with earthquakes which could be noticed out to a 25.0 kilometres (15.5 mi) distance around the volcano.

On Tuesday 7 September, Mount Sinabung erupted yet again, its most powerful eruption since. The force of the explosion could be felt 8 km away.

=== Government response ===
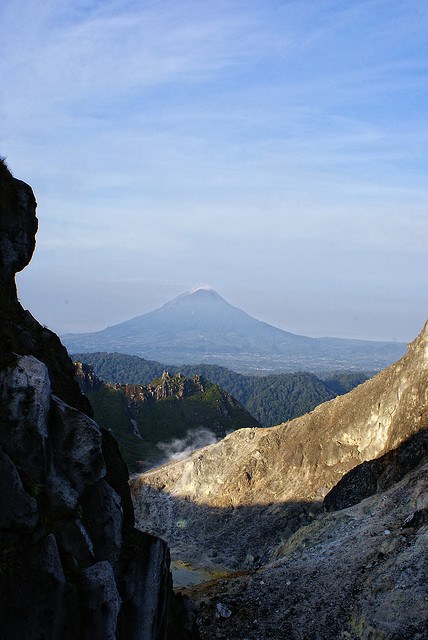
Mount Sinabung, March 20, 2010.

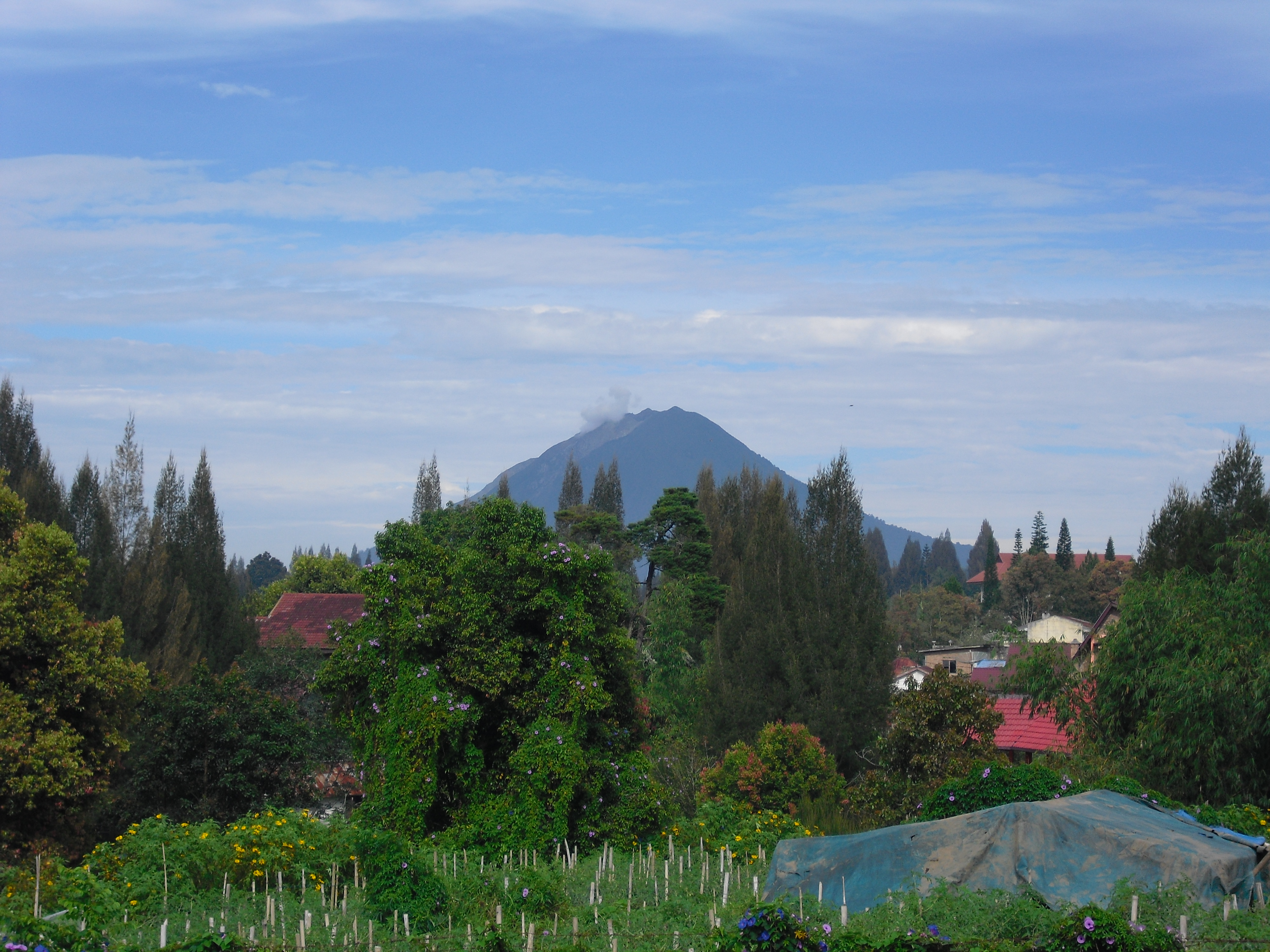
Mount Sinabung, April 23, 2013.

The Indonesian government was reported to have evacuated around 17,500 people from the region on and around the volcano. The government issued the highest-level warning for the area, which was expected to remain in force for around a week, since scientists were unfamiliar with the characteristics of the volcano, due to it having been dormant for so long. The government also set up kitchens for refugees to have access to food and handed out 7,000 masks. Over 10,000 people have been internally evacuated after the eruption, Secretary of the provincial administration, Edy Sofyan told Xinhua by phone. Spokesman of National Disaster Management Agency Priyadi Kardono said the eruption had not been predicted earlier like other volcanoes and that authorities must conduct a quick preparation for emergency work because Mount Sinabung's seismic activity has been monitored intensively only since Friday after it showed an increase in activity. In the wake of the eruption, the National Disaster Management Agency (Badan Nasional Penanggulangan Bencana/BNPB), supported the roughly 27,489 displaced people by providing shelters. In addition, "BNPB has distributed 1,000 blankets, 1,000 sleeping mats and 500 family tents. The local government has allocated 50 tonnes of rice, 14,000 tins of fish, 1 water truck, 1,000 bottles of ketchup, 240 kg of instant noodles, 500 blankets, 50 family tents, 200 sleeping mats, oxygen bottles/tubes for emergency, and 5,000 packs of vitamin C and B6."

=== Impacts ===
The towns nearest to the volcano are Kabanjahe and Berastagi. There were no disruptions reported to air services at the regional airport, Medan's Polonia. One person was reported dead due to the eruption; he had respiratory problems while fleeing his home. Animals were poisoned due to the pyroclastic flow.

=== 2013 ===
On Sunday 15 September 2013, the volcano erupted at around 3 a.m local time. More than 3,700 people were evacuated from areas within a 3 kilometre (2 mile) radius of the volcano, and five halls normally used for traditional cultural ceremonies were converted into shelters with at least 1,500 being temporarily housed.

The volcano erupted again on 5 November 2013, for the third time in as many months, forcing thousands of villagers to evacuate. The Indonesian Center for Volcanology and Geological Hazard Mitigation advised villagers to keep a distance of at least 2 miles from the volcano, while 5,000 people were evacuated from North Sumatra Karo Regency. The eruption has affected the people living around the volcano in more than one way; crops died due to the ash fall leading to an economic change in the area. Sinabung is one of 34 active volcanoes in Sumatra, which straddles the "Pacific Ring of Fire". On 11 November 2013, a pyroclastic flow, a fast-moving avalanche of ash, lava fragments and air, was seen racing down the peak. Since the eruption, Mount Sinabung has been very active in terms of having explosions of ash up to 2 times a day.

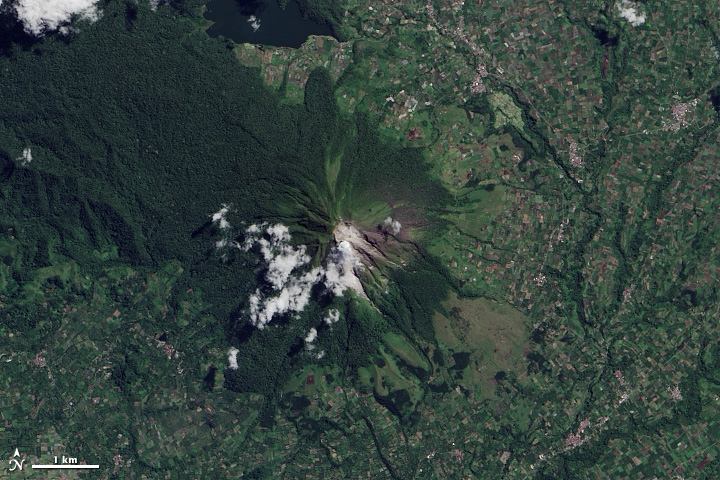
Sinabung on June 7, 2013

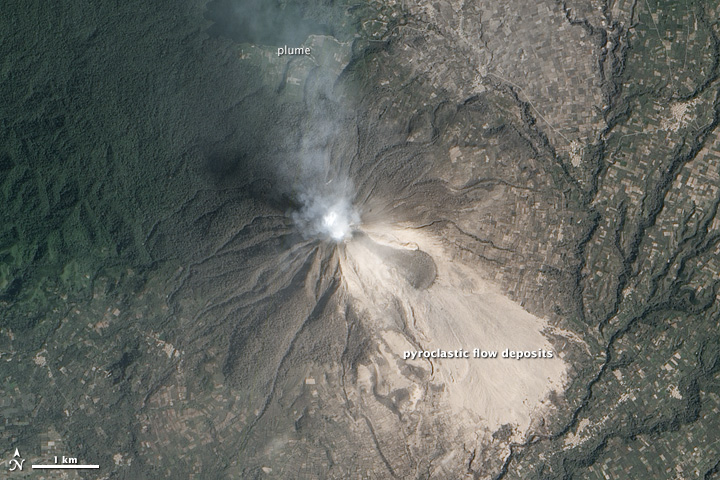
Sinabung on February 6, 2014

By 28 December 2013 a lava dome had formed on the summit.

=== 2014 ===
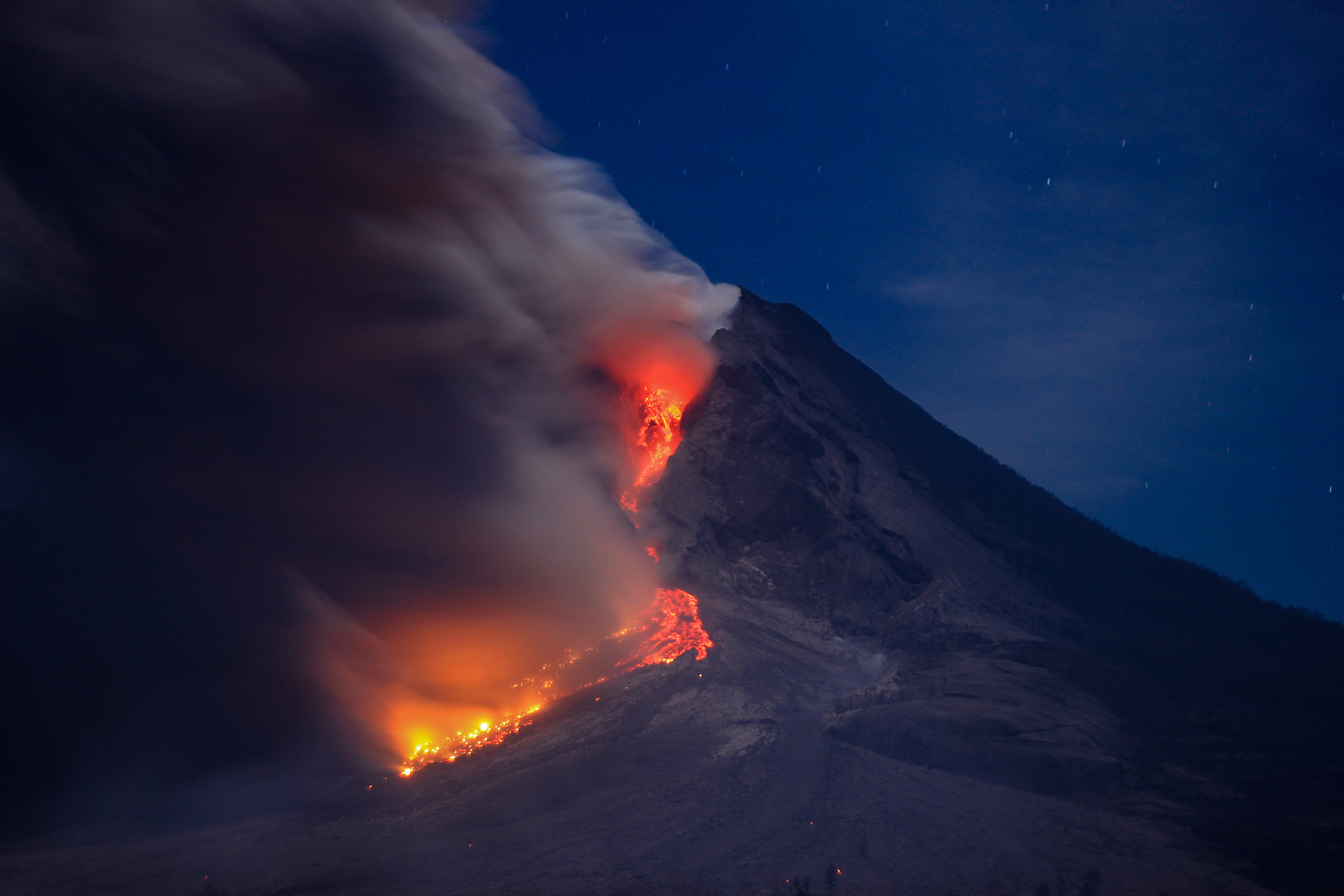
Sinabung 13 January 2014

On 4 January 2014, the volcano erupted again. "Mount Sinabung, which has erupted over a hundred times between Jan. 4 through the morning of January 5 is spewing out a 4,000 metre (13,000 ft) high column of ash damaging property and crops and poisoning animals over a wide radius."

On 1 February 2014 a further eruption occurred that sent clouds of hot ash 2 kilometres (1.2 mi) into the air and engulfed nearby villages. Reports claim that at least 16 people died as a result of the eruption, which occurred just after residents living more than five kilometers from the mountain had been allowed to return home following a lack of recent volcanic activity. Among the dead were a local television journalist and four high-school students along with their teacher, who were visiting the mountain to see the eruptions up close. Seven of the victims were members of the Indonesian Christian Student Movement (GMKI), who died while trying to save local residents as pyroclastic flows swept across Mount Sinabung.

Eruptions continued in October 2014. On 5 October, four eruptions in the early hours of the morning were reported by the Badan Nasional Penanggulangan Bencana (BNPB). The first one produced an ash plume of up to 2 km in height and a pyroclastic flow of 4.5 km in a southerly direction.

The Darwin Volcanic Ash Advisory Centre (VAAC) reported eruptions between 6 and 10 October, with some evacuations from surrounding villages. Further eruptions between 20 and 25 October have resulted in a meteorological cloud of ash obscuring some satellite observation. On 26 October the pyroclastic flow travelled 3.5 km and resulted in avalanches in the area.

Recent activity on Mount Sinabung has resulted in higher levels of tourism and sight-seeing in the area. The Tourism Agency of the Karo regency has officially proposed several locations to local government as potential tourist sites. Tours to different villages and viewing sites are already available in the area.

=== 2016 ===
An eruption on 22 May 2016 killed at least seven people and critically injured three more. Activity continued and ash plumes were observed throughout 2016.

=== 2017 ===
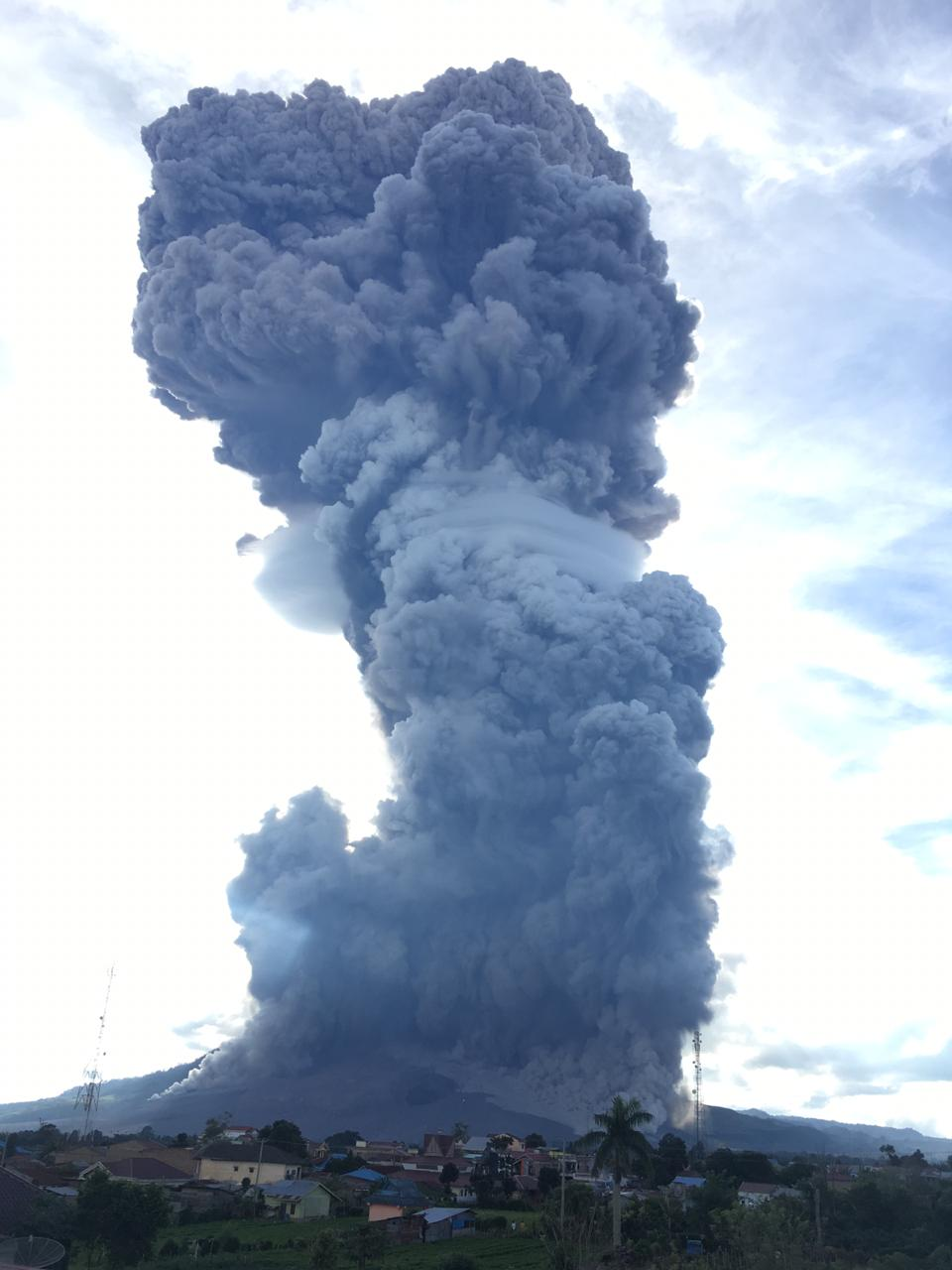
An explosive eruption sent a 7,000 meter tall column of ash into the air on 9 June 2019.

Activity increased starting around April 2017, with a large ash eruption on 2 August 2017. Additional activity, including ash plumes, were observed over the next several months. The largest eruption of the year occurred during the last week of December and continued into early 2018.

=== 2018 ===
A large eruption took place on 19 February 2018, producing a very tall eruption column. Indonesia's National Disaster Mitigation Agency said there were no fatalities or injuries. The eruption blew off at least 1.6 million cubic meters of material from the mountain's summit. Another eruption occurred less than two months later on 6 April 2018.

=== 2019 ===
An eruption took place on 7 May 2019, sending a massive column of ash and smoke 2,000 meters (6,500 feet) into the air, coating local villages in debris. Local residents living along rivers near the volcano were advised to be on alert for possible lava flows. Officials stated that the eruption had the potential to affect aerial flights, though they did not issue a formal advisory for planes to avoid the area at the time.

A large eruption occurred on 9 June, at 04.28 p.m., local time, sending a plume of ash 7,000 meters (22,966 feet) into the air, and generating a pyroclastic flow 3‒3,5 kilometers long towards the south and southeast.

=== 2020 ===
On 10 August 2020, Mount Sinabung erupted producing an eruption column of volcanic materials as high as 5,000 meters (16,400 feet) into the sky.

=== 2021 ===
On 3 January 2021 09:34, Sinabung erupted, a column of ash 1,000 metres (3,300 ft) into the sky. Data from the Volcanological Survey of Indonesia (PVMBG) indicated that the column was being blown by winds to the west coast. Immediately, the volcano's status was raised to Level III (Alarming). In response, those living within a 5-kilometer radius of the volcano were asked not to do any outdoor activities. The existence of lahar was said to be potential.

The next day, 4 January, at 11:50, it erupted again, sending another column of ash 1,000 metres (3,300 ft) into the sky.

On 2 March, Mount Sinabung erupted, spewing a column of ash 5,000 metres (16,000 ft) into the air. No casualties were reported, but people were advised to stay at least three kilometers from the crater by Indonesia's Volcanology and Geological Hazard Mitigation Center.

On 4 April 07:06, Mount Sinabung erupted, spewing a column of ash 3,500 metres (11,500 ft) into the sky.

On 28 July 13:20 local time, Mount Sinabung erupted, sending a massive column of smoke and ash 4,500 meters (14,760 ft) into the sky. It also generated pyroclastic flows that traveled down the eastern and southeastern flank for about 1000 m.

==== 2026 ====
On August 31st, 2026, Mount Sinabung erupted. It spewed smoke and ash 11,500 ft. into the atmosphere. There were initially no reports of casualties, evacuations, or flight disruptions. (AP)

== Ecology ==
An ecosystem responds to volcanism in many different ways depending on the frequency, scale, and severity of the eruptions. Furthermore, it can be assumed that the pyroclastic flow of the eruption, whose temperature was estimated at 700 °C (1,300 °F) by Indonesian officials, killed much of the organic matter including plants and animals. As seen in the Mount St. Helens eruption, many insects would likely die due to the ash fall. This abrasion due to the ash causes quick desiccation. Although many insects may have survived from being in trees that were not torn down or deep in the ground, these insects may not live long after the event due to lack of resources. Many larger animals may not have been able to escape the flow in time. However, like at Mt. St. Helens, many of these animals could recover from pools of survivors and from migrations of other species.

== In popular culture ==
Mount Sinabung is featured in the 2016 Werner Herzog documentary Into the Inferno.

== See also ==
- Mount Sibayak – an active volcano near Sinabung
