= Joop Vermeulen =

Dutch long-distance runner

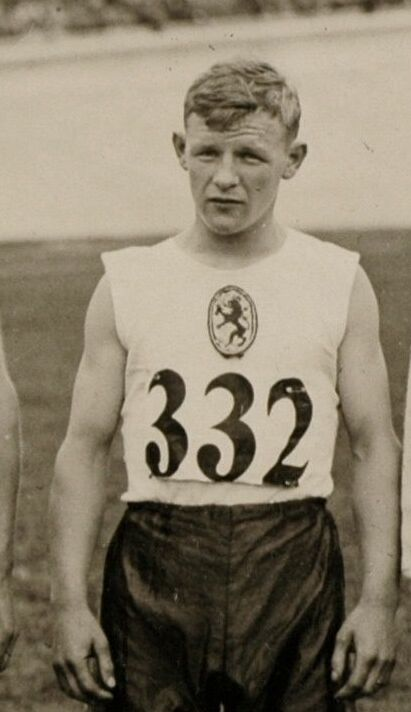
- Vermeulen (1928)

Personal information
- Nationality: Dutch
- Born: 21 October 1907 Zwammerdam, Netherlands
- Died: 10 November 1984 (aged 77) Rotterdam, Netherlands

Sport
- Sport: Long-distance running
- Event: Marathon

Joop Vermeulen (21 October 1907 – 10 November 1984) was a Dutch long-distance runner. He competed in the marathon at the 1928 Summer Olympics.
