= Lumbini Natural Park =

Buddhist temple in Indonesia

Lumbini Natural Park Taman Alam Lumbini လုမ္ဗီနီကသဘာဝပန်းခြံ
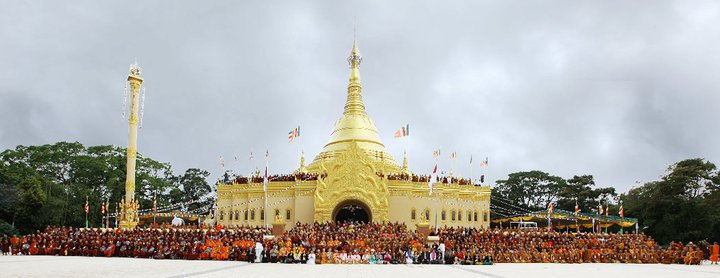
- Pagoda of Lumbini Natural Park, Berastagi

Monastery information
- Order: All Buddhist
- Established: October 2010

People
- Founder: Tongariodjo Angkasa Ginting

Site
- Location: Tongkoh Village, Dolat Rakyat, Berastagi
- Country: Indonesia
- Website: www.tamanalamlumbini.org

Lumbini Natural Park (Indonesian: Taman Alam Lumbini) is a Buddhist temple located at Desa Dolat Rayat, Berastagi in North Sumatra, Indonesia. It was inaugurated with a great ceremony in October 2010. The ceremony was attended by more than 1,300 monks and more than 200 lay people from around the world. Taman Alam Lumbini is a replica of Shwedagon Pagoda in Yangon, Myanmar. The architecture is similar to a Myanmar pagoda, covered in gold. It hosts an elephant statue and the door appears like a Burmese craft.

== History ==
The temple is based on the Shwedagon Pagoda in Myanmar. Construction began in 2007. The project was successfully completed in 2010. It is 46.8 metres (154 ft) in height, 68 metres (223 ft) in length and 68 metres (223 ft) in width. The replica is the second-highest among pagodas outside of Myanmar. This replica consists of:

- 1 unit large pagoda, with the scale of 42 metres (138 ft) in height, 25.8 metres (85 ft) in length, 25.8 metres (85 ft) in width.
- 8 units small pagoda with the scale of 7.18 metres (23.6 ft) in height, 5.38 metres (17.7 ft) in length, 5.38 metres (17.7 ft) in width.
- 1 unit Ashoka Pillar with the scale of 19.8 metres (65 ft) in height and 0.8 metres (2 ft 7 in) in diameter pole.
- 4 units Sakyamuni Buddha Statue made from Burmese green jade.
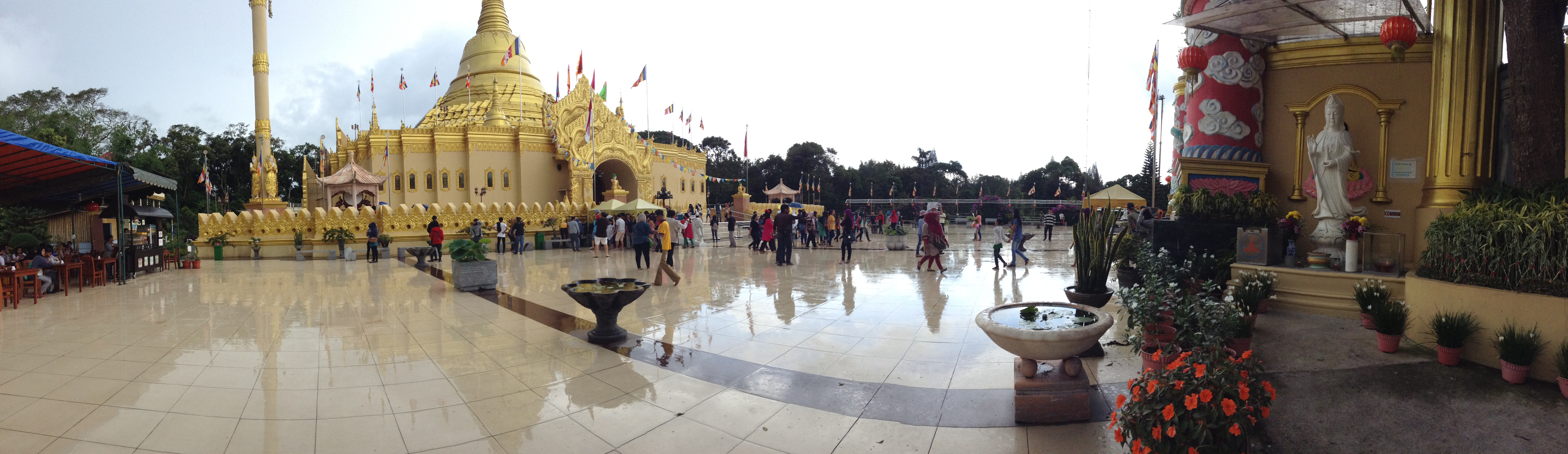
View of Lumbini's Pagoda
