= Antonius Ginting =

Indonesian politician

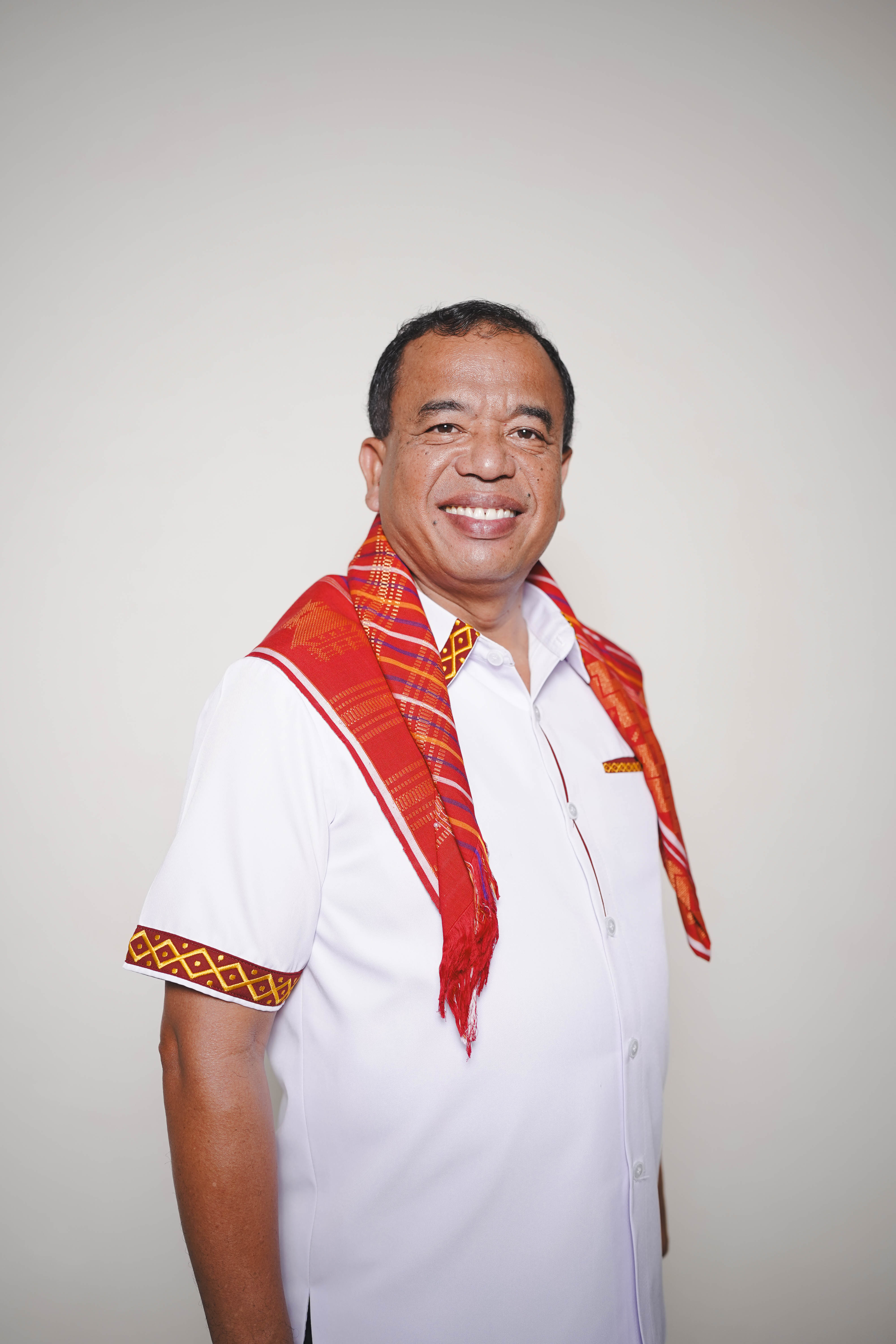

Regent of Karo
- Incumbent
- Assumed office 20 February 2025
- President: Prabowo Subianto
- Governor: Bobby Nasution
- Lieutenant: Komando Tarigan
- Preceded by: Cory Sriwaty Sebayang

Personal details
- Born: July 6, 1965 (age 61) Tigapanah, Karo, North Sumatra
- Party: Gerindra
- Spouse: Roswitha Bukit
- Children: 3

Military service
- Allegiance: Indonesia
- Branch/service: Police
- Years of service: 1994 – 2024
- Rank: Brigadier general
- Unit: Medicine

Antonius Ginting (born 6 July 1965) is an Indonesian politician and retired police physician with the rank of brigadier general. He served as the Regent of Karo since 2025. Prior to his election, he headed a number of police hospitals in Indonesia and served as the surgeon general of the Bengkulu Police from 2022 to 2023.

== Early life and education ==
Antonius Ginting was born in Tigapanah, Karo, North Sumatra, on 6 July 1965. He completed his high school education at the Pancurbatu State High School in 1985. He studied medicine at the University of North Sumatra (USU) and graduated as a physician in 1993. He joined the police in 1994 after undergoing a short term orientation course for university graduate officers. He specialized in obstetrics and gynecology at USU, completing the program in 2003. He received his master’s degree in health sciences in 2010 and doctorate in 2019 from USU. Outside his formal education, he attended a leadership course at the National Institute of Public Administration in 2010 and national leadership courses in 2018 and 2020.

== Career ==
After earning his medical degree, Ginting began working in the police health division. In 2003, he served as Head of Health Services at the Medical and Health Division of the Riau Regional Police. In 2009, he was appointed Head of Forensics at Bhayangkara Hospital in Medan. Two years later, he became the chairman of the medical committee of the hospital. From 5 June 2017 to 14 March 2019, Ginting led the Tebing Tinggi Police Hospital. He advanced to become the head of Medan Police Hospital in 2019, then moved to the same position in Semarang in 2021. On 12 January 2022, he became the surgeon general of the Bengkulu Police. He held this position until 14 July 2023 and became a senior instructor at the police health center. Shortly before his retirement, Ginting was promoted to the rank of brigadier general.

Alongside his public service, Ginting established and managed several private healthcare institutions. He owns Bina Kasih General Hospital in Medan and Kasih Insani General Hospital in Deli Serdang, as well as several pharmacies in Medan. Ginting also founded Bina Kasih Nusantara High School and Wira Husada University in Medan, institutions focusing on health and science education.

Ginting was a member of several medical and religious organization. He has long been a member of Ikatan Dokter Indonesia, the Indonesian professional medical association, as well as the Indonesian Association of Obstetrics and Gynecology. He has also participated in the Indonesian Hospital Association in North Sumatra and served as chair of the 36th Synod Assembly of the Batak Karo Protestant Church in 2020.

== Regent of Karo ==
In 2024, Ginting ran for Regent of Karo alongside Komando Tarigan as his deputy. Their ticket won the local election with 98,020 votes. On 20 February 2025, Ginting and Tarigan were officially inaugurated as regent and vice regent by President Prabowo Subianto.

== Personal life ==
Antonius Ginting is married to Roswitha Bukit and has three children.
