= Zwammerdam =

Village in South Holland, Netherlands

- Village
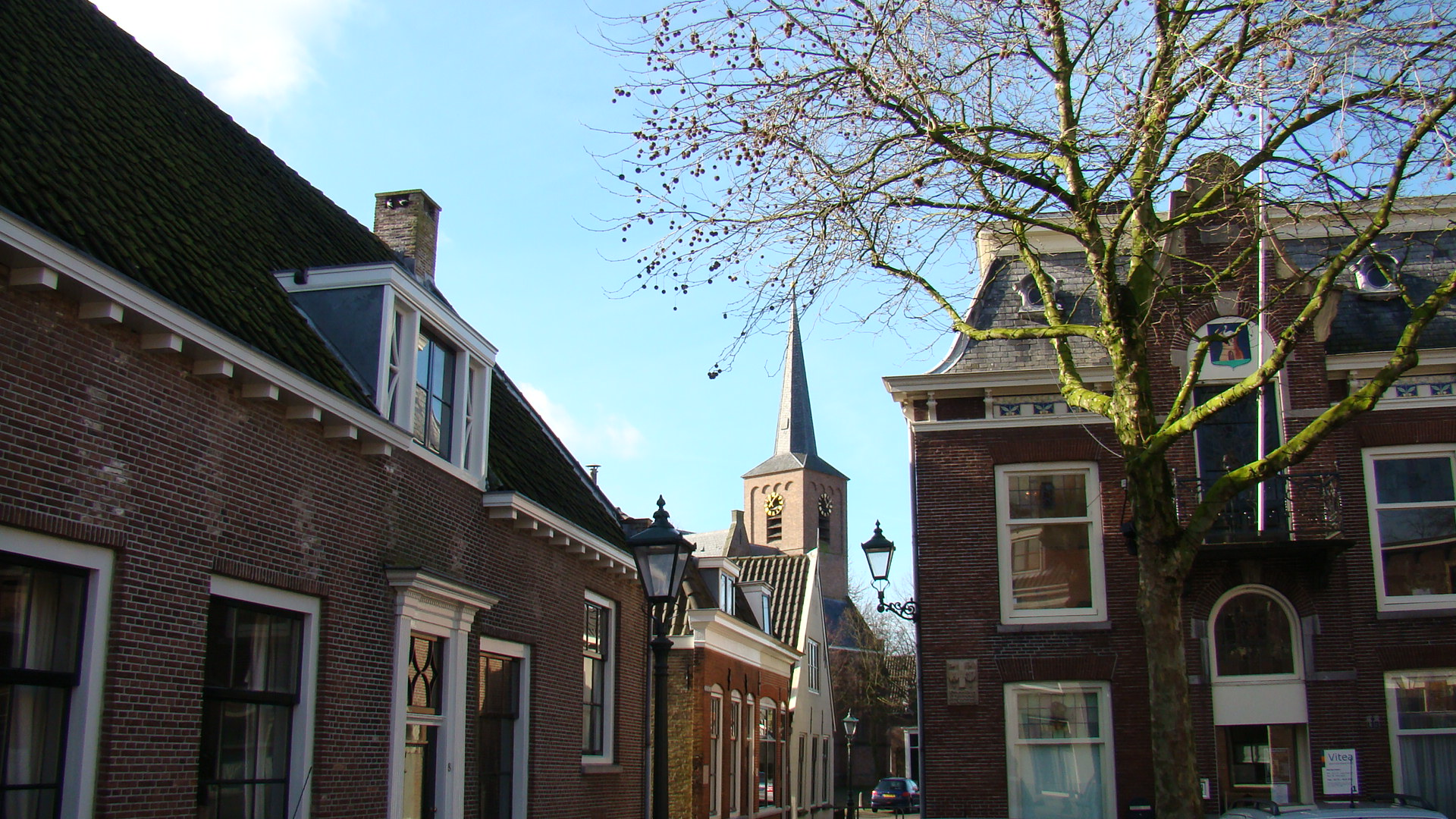
- Centre of Zwammerdam

- Flag Coat of arms

- Location in the province of South Holland in the Netherlands Location in the Netherlands
- Coordinates: 52°6′21″N 4°43′38″E
- Country: Netherlands
- Province: South Holland
- Municipality: Alphen aan den Rijn

Area
  - Total: 1.60 km^{2} (0.62 sq mi)
- Elevation: 0.2 m (0.66 ft)

Population (2021)
  - Total: 1,900
  - Density: 1,200/km^{2} (3,100/sq mi)
- Time zone: UTC+1 (CET)
  - Summer (DST): UTC+2 (CEST)
- Postal code: 2471
- Dialing code: 0172

Zwammerdam is a village in the Dutch province of South Holland along Oude Rijn river. It is a part of the municipality of Alphen aan den Rijn, and lies about 6 km southeast of Alphen aan de Rijn. The name derives from a dam built in the Rhine river in 1165 AD by Count Floris III of Holland, to protect the land stream downwards from floods.

In 2020, the village of Zwammerdam had 1850 inhabitants. The built-up area of the town was 62 km², and contained 484 residences. The statistical area "Zwammerdam", which also can include the surrounding countryside, has a population of around 1810.

Zwammerdam was a separate municipality until 1964, when it was divided between Alphen aan den Rijn and Bodegraven. The town is the current home of the Jostiband Orchestra.

The ancient Romans built fortress (castrum) Nigrum Pullum as part of the defence system of the Roman Empire ’s northern frontier (Limes Germanicus) close to where now Zwammerdam is. In the 1970s during groundwork for the building of a new caregiving residence, remains were found of wooden ships from the Roman period. Extensive archeological excavations brought up six ships of different sizes, known as Schepen van Zwammerdam, now exhibited at the nearby open-air museum Archeon.

== Notable residents ==
- Quirijn van Brekelenkam, painter
- Leendert Konijn, planter
- Gerda Verburg, politician
- Joop Vermeulen, athlete

== Gallery ==
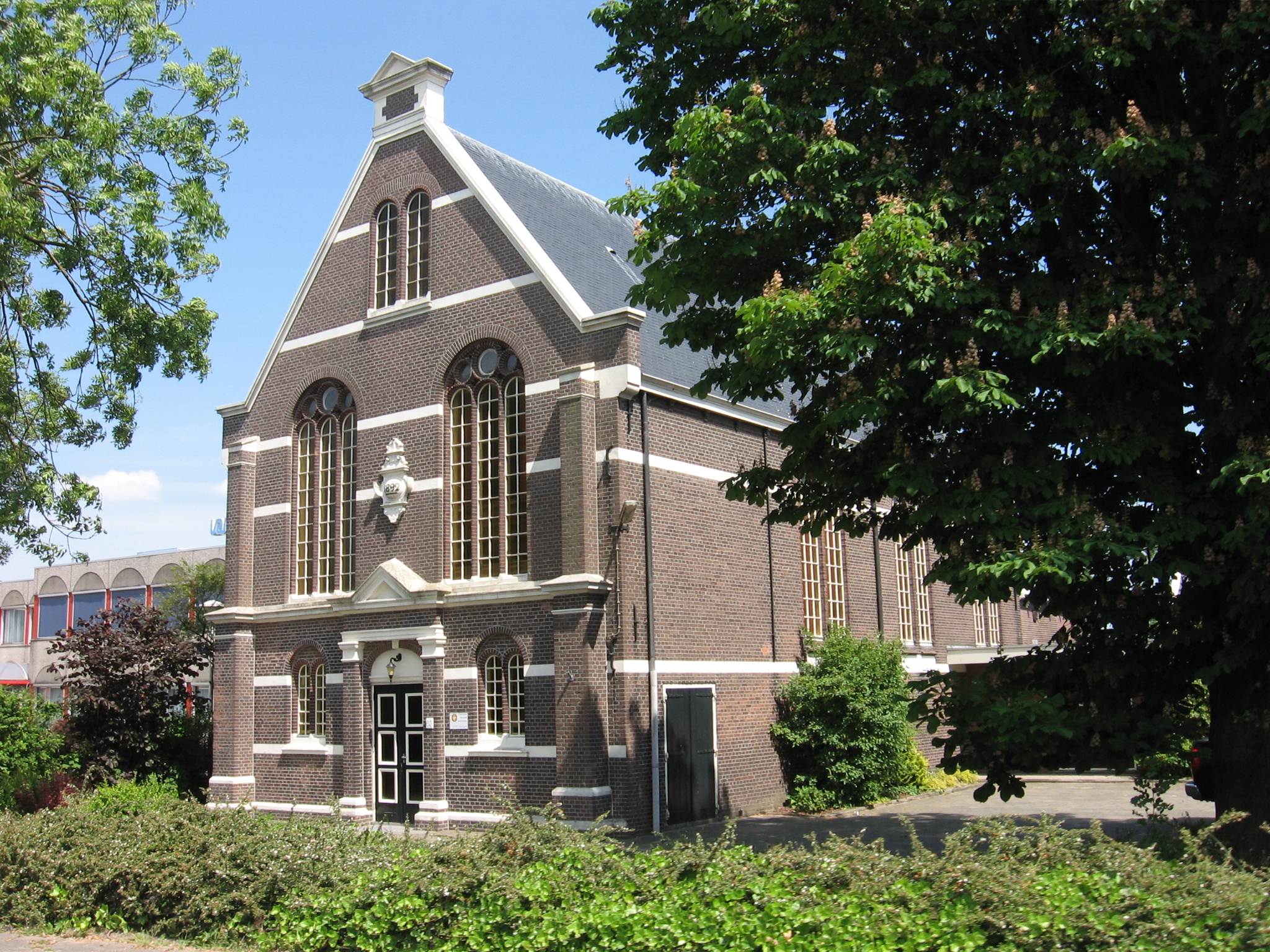
Kerklaan

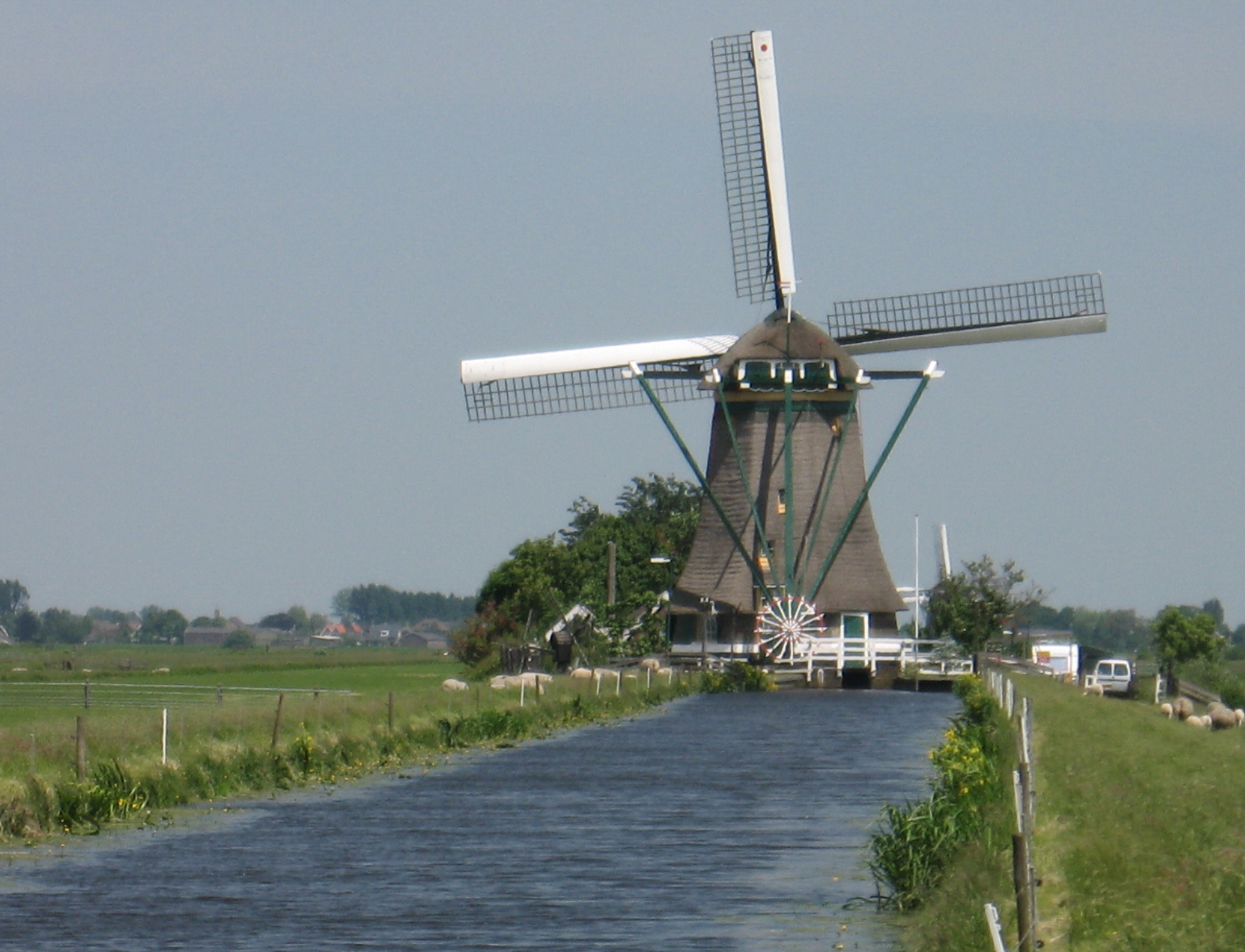
Windmill for waterpumping

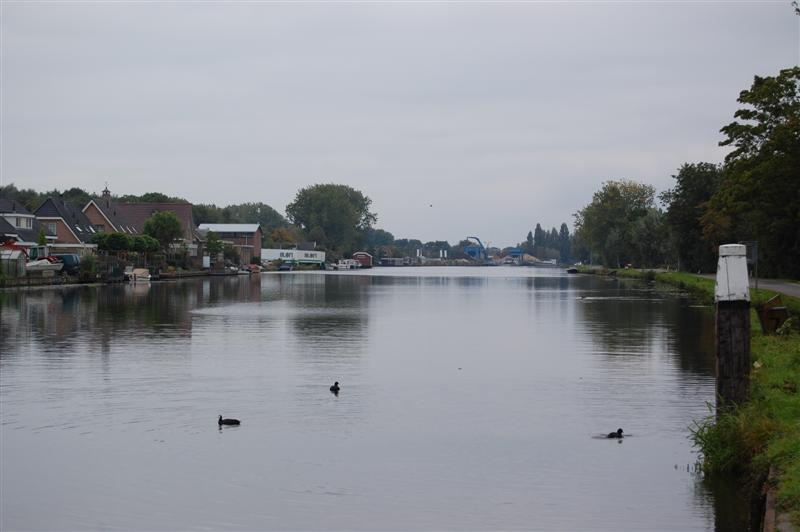
Oude Rijn at Zwammerdam

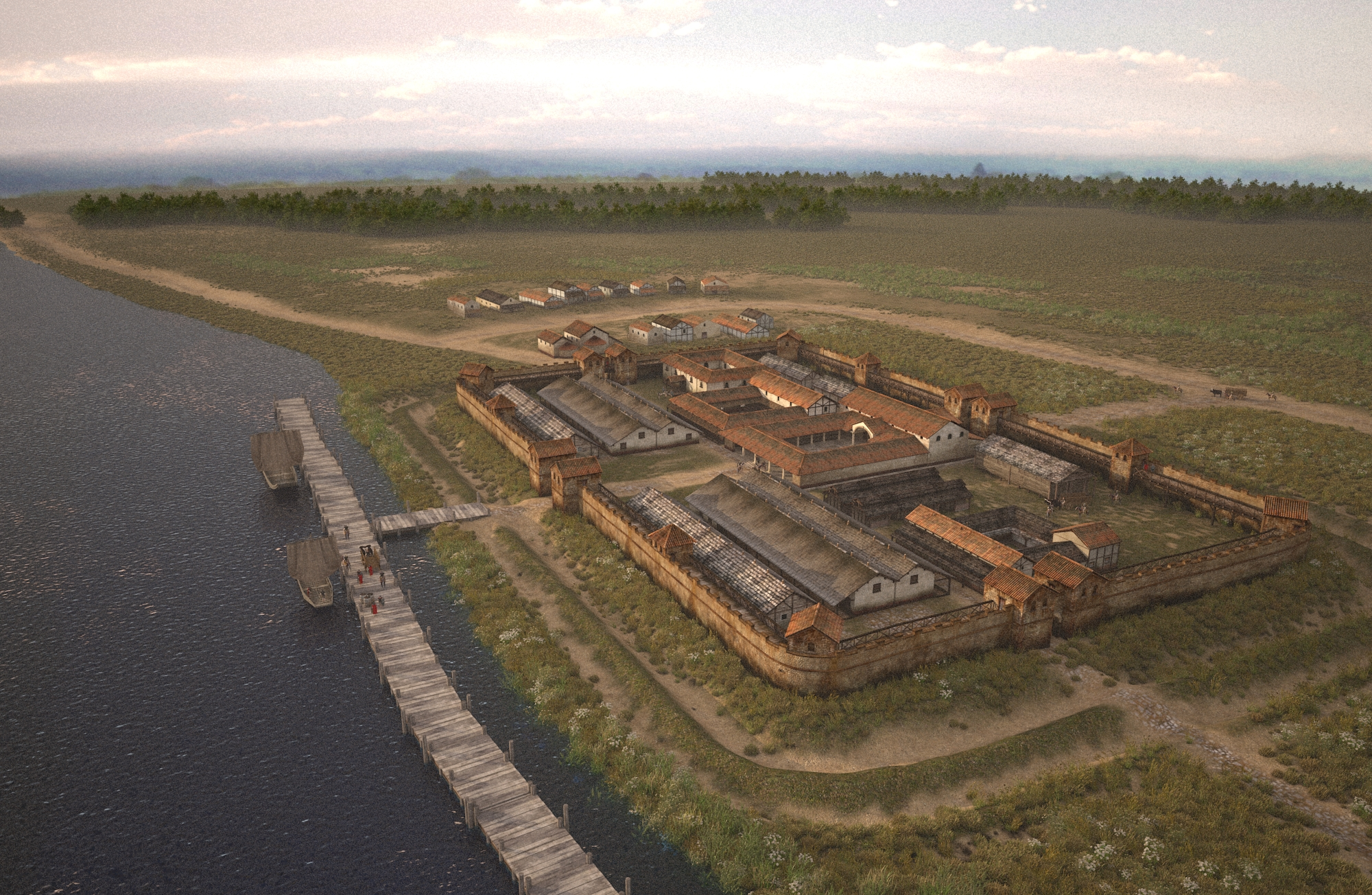
Castrum Nigrum Pullum, artist impression Stevie Xinas

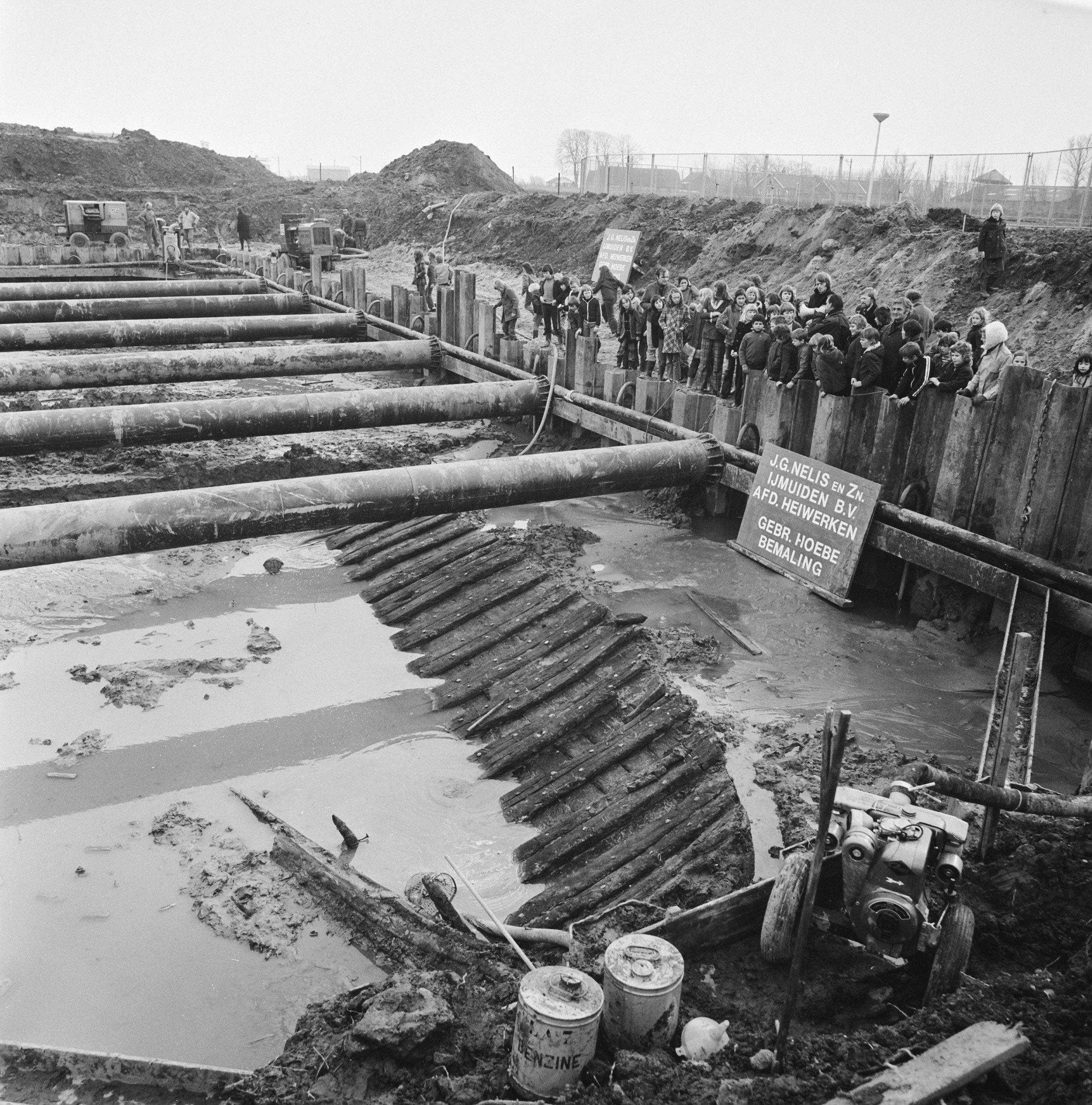
Excavation ancient Roman ship 1973
