= Berastagi =

Coordinates: 3°11′N 98°31′E

Berastagi Brastagi
- District
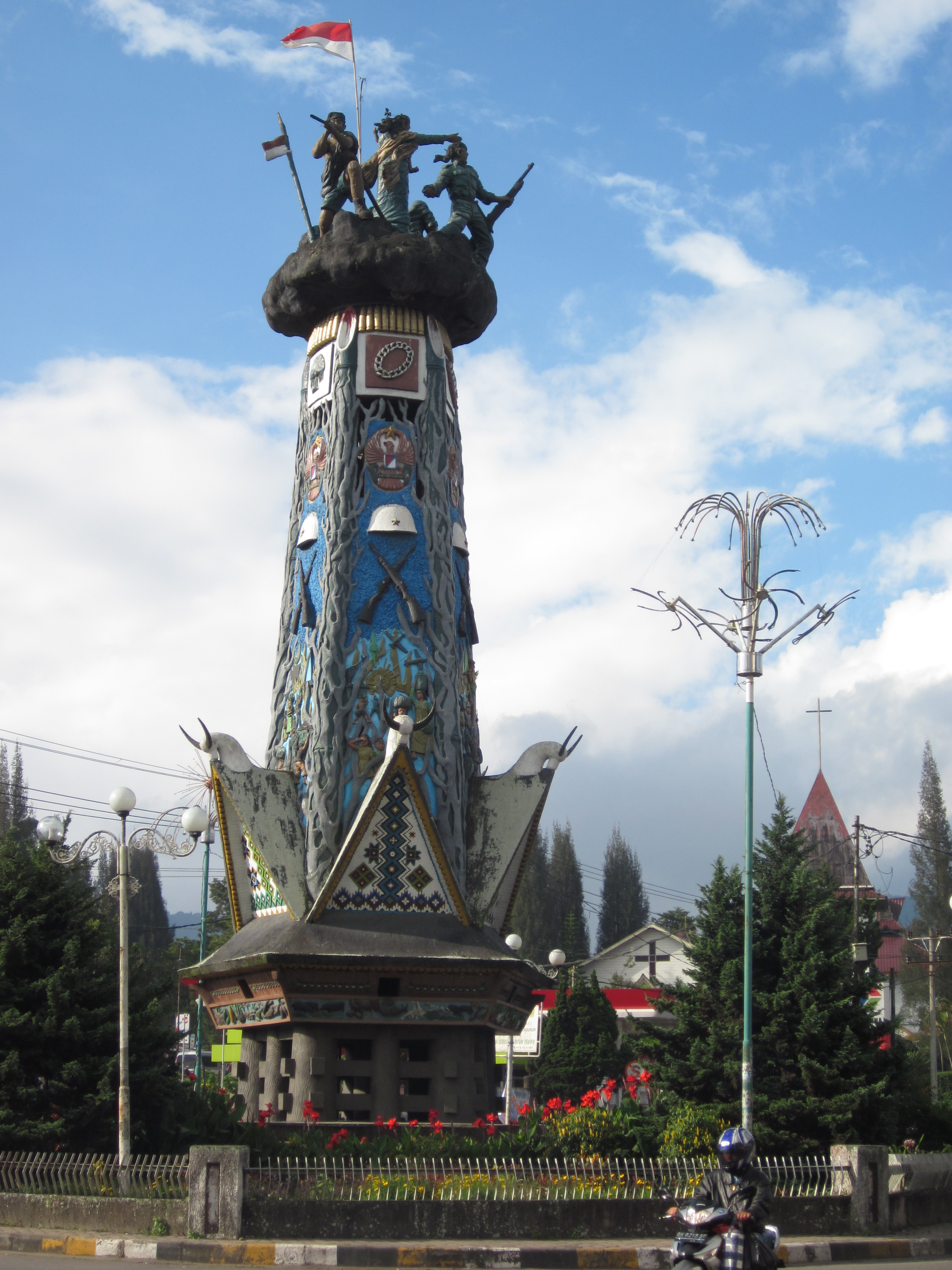
- Heroic Monument, Berastagi
- Interactive map of Berastagi
- Country: Indonesia
- Province: North Sumatra
- Regency: Karo Regency

Area
  - Total: 30.50 km^{2} (11.78 sq mi)
- Elevation: 1,300 m (4,300 ft)

Population (2020 Census)
  - Total: 48,244
  - Density: 1,582/km^{2} (4,097/sq mi)
- Time zone: UTC+7 (WIB)
- Website: http://www.karokab.go.id/in/

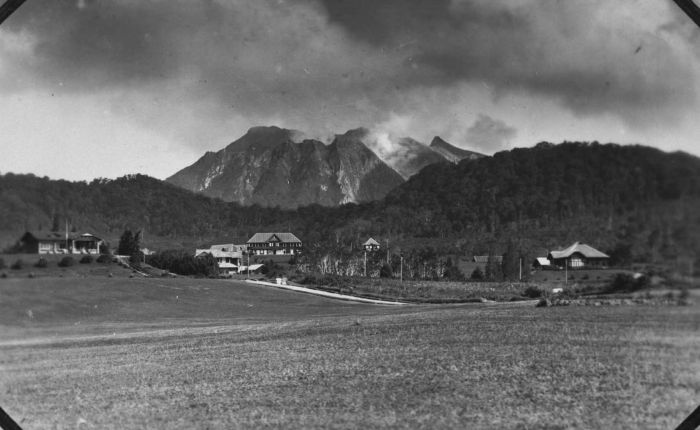
Berastagi panorama in 1940s with Mount Sibayak in the background

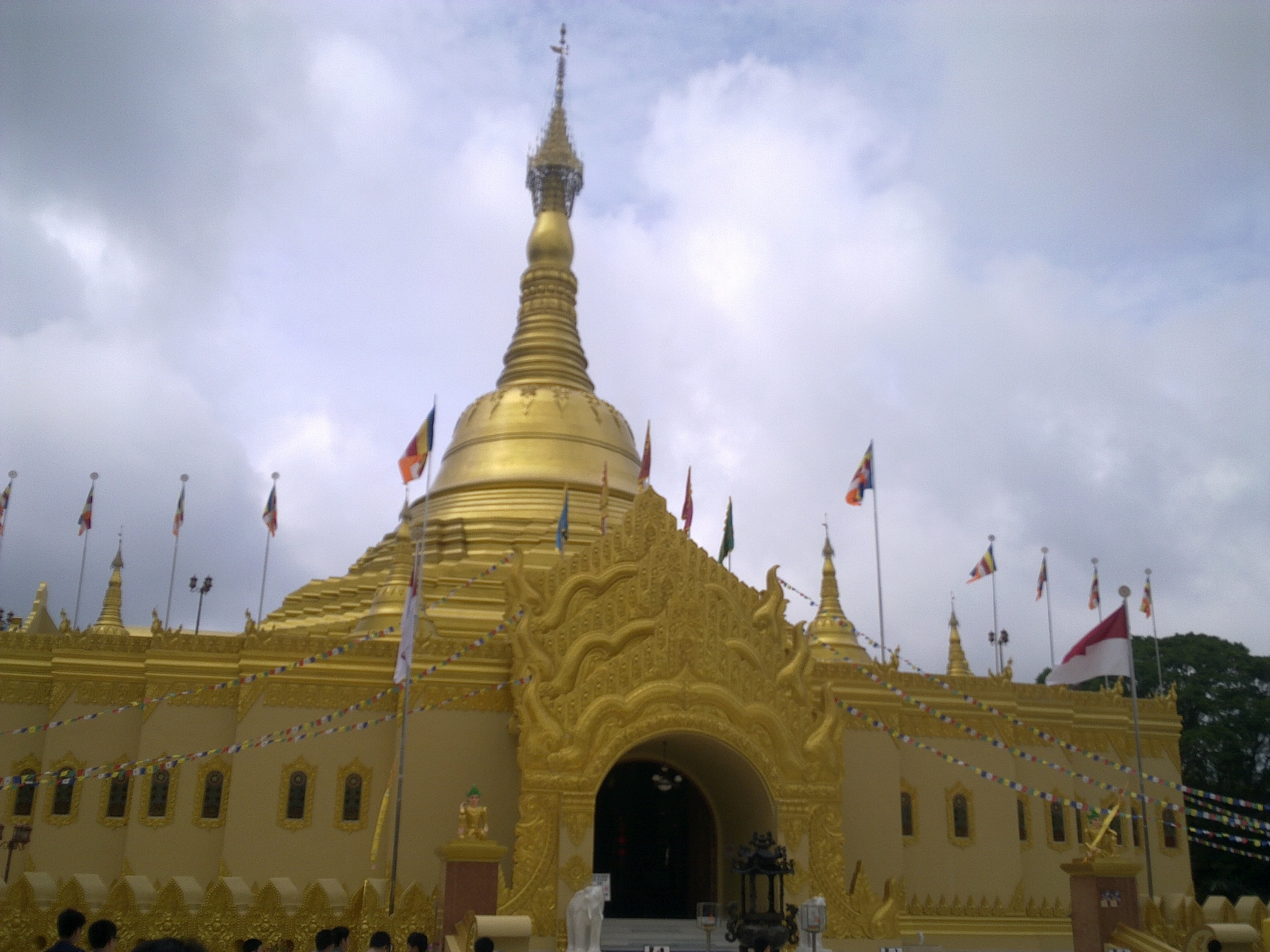
Lumbini Park, Berastagi

Berastagi (Dutch: Brastagi), is a town and district of Karo Regency situated on a crossroads on the main route linking the Karo highlands of Northern Sumatra to the coastal city of Medan. Berastagi town is located around 66 km (41 mi) south of Medan and about 1,300 m (4,265 ft) above sea level. The village rose to significance when Dutch settlers in Sumatra opened a boarding school there in the 1920s.

== Climate ==
Located in the Barisan Mountains area, the mean annual temperature of the district is 18 °C (64 °F). During the day the temperature rises over 25 °C (77 °F) but at night to early morning it could drop to as low as 12 to 16 °C (54 to 61 °F), it could also reach 9 °C (48 °F) during the rainy season. The weather can be fair and sunny during the day but may become foggy around dusk to night.

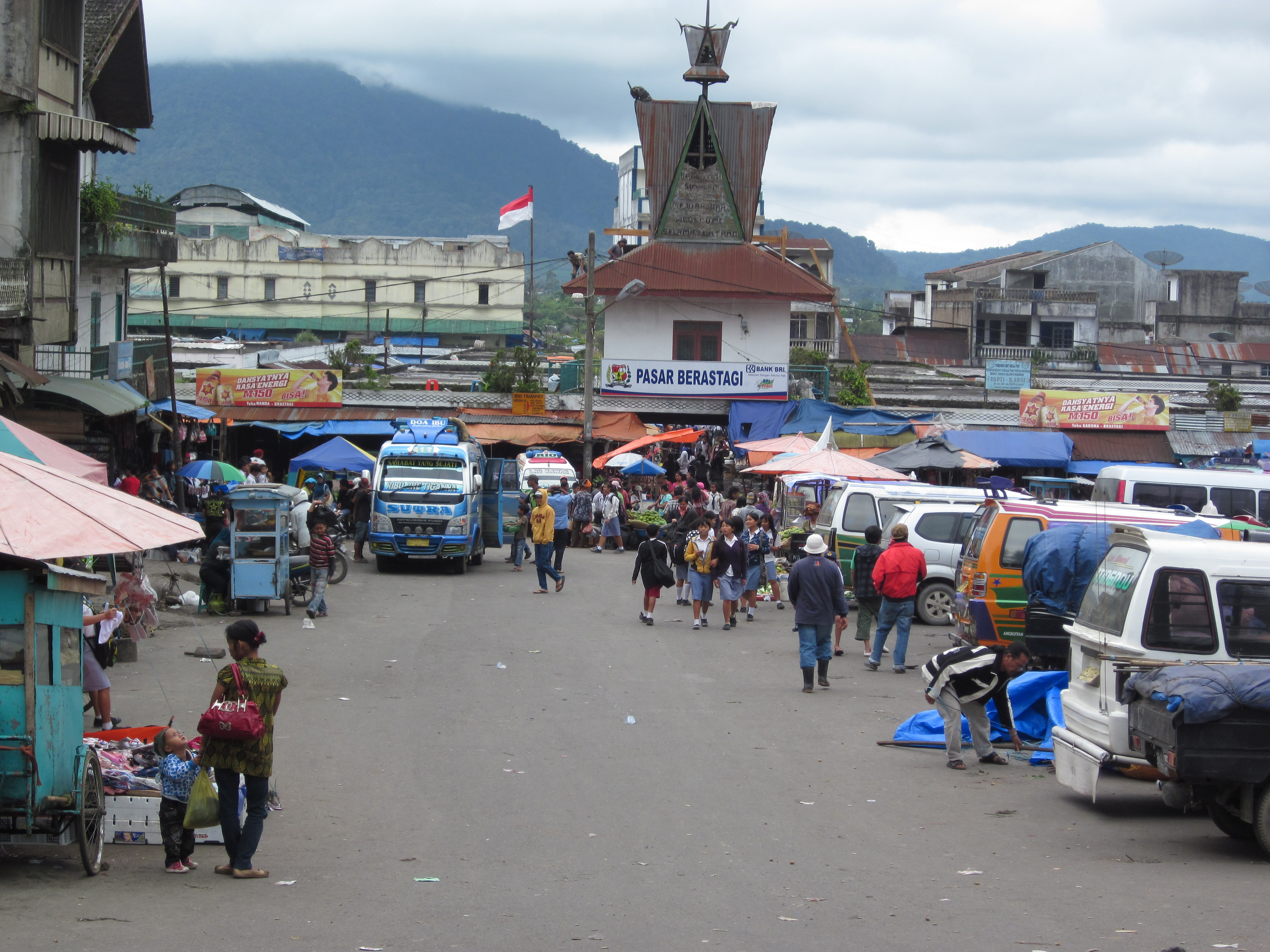
Berastagi Fruit Market

== Administration ==
=== Villages ===
The small towns of Barusjahe and Tigapanah are located to the east of Berastagi, while Simpang Empat, is located to the west, Deli Serdang Regency to the north, and Kabanjahe to the south of Berastagi.

There are 9 villages, called desa, in the Berastagi district. It is the smallest (30.5 km^{2} (11.8 sq mi)), but most densely populated (1,582 persons/square kilometre in 2020) district of Karo Regency. The elevation is 1,400 m (4,593 ft).

Desas with population (2007):

- Gurusinga, 3,900
- Raya, 4,358
- Rumah Berastagi, 6,611
- Tambak Lau Mulgap I, 2,677
- Tambak Lau Mulgap II, 3,147
- Gundaling I, 8,388
- Gundaling II, 5130
- Sempajaya, 7,115
- Doulu, 2,011
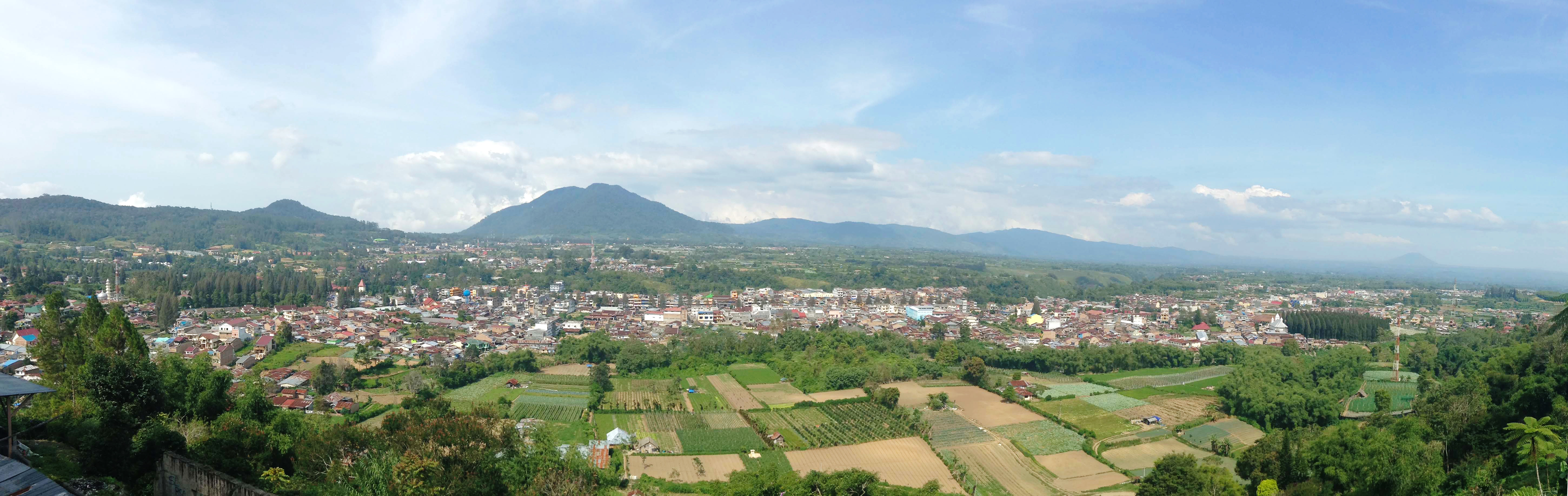
Berastagi viewed from Gundaling Hill

== Demographics ==
The population of Berastagi district was 44,765 as of 2010 but increased to 48,244 in 2020. It is the second-most populous district in Karo Regency, after Kabanjahe. Berastagi District has significantly more Muslims than most parts of Karo Regency, with 17,801 Muslims, 5,042 Catholics, 29,195 Protestants, 1,245 Hindus or Buddhists, and 54 others, Sempajaya has the highest percentage of Muslims among the desas, being 67% Muslim. There are 28 mosques, 29 churches, and 2 Buddhist temples in the district.

The town is ethnically diverse with many migrants from adjacent regions. Besides Karo Batak, who form the majority of the population, there is a substantial amount of Toba Batak, Javanese, and Chinese living in Berastagi.

97% of primary-age children attend school, but only 77% of high-school-age children. There are 26 primary schools, 8 intermediate schools, and 9 high schools within the district.

== Economy ==
=== Agriculture ===
Agriculture is much less important in Berastagi (and Kabanjahe) than in the rest of Karo Regency. Crops include scallions, common beans, peas, potatoes, cauliflower, cabbage, radish, Chinese cabbage, tomatoes, carrots, and chayote. Rice is not a significant crop. Fruit grown include oranges, passionfruit, kaki, and avocados. There is significantly more industry in the Berastagi district than in the rest of Karo Regency, aided by Berastagi's 100% paved roads.

=== Tourism ===
Due to its close distance from Medan, Berastagi was developed initially as an upper-class hill station for the European population in the plantation district around Medan. Today, Berastagi attracts a large amount of local as well as national and international tourists. Many investors developed several tourism sites, hotels, and lodges to attract visitors from Medan and elsewhere. Places of interest include

- Gundaling, a hill located in the town center, with a height of more than 80 m (262 ft), visitors can enjoy an overview of Berastagi from here.
- Miki Holiday Hotel and Funland, a hotel with an amusement park inside, is located in Sempajaya village.
- Lumbini Natural Park is a Theravāda style Buddhist temple that is similar to the Shwedagon Pagoda in Myanmar, built-in 2010.
- Bukit Kubu (Kubu Hill), is a greeny hill area with a hotel inside suitable for picnics.
- Berastagi Fruit Market is a regionally famous traditional market selling local fruit souvenirs.
- Milk Pasteurization factory, a factory that sells local pasteurized milk. Visitors can also observe the procedure of making the product.
- Tahura, abbreviated as Taman Hutan Raya (Forest Park), is a forest with various types of trees. Located near the town's entry gate.
- Kebun Madu Efi, located above 1400 masl this honey apiary provides Boutique Cabins, a Camping area featuring tent rentals, flower gardens, buffet dining & picturesque mountain and hill views.

Berastagi is famous for its passion fruit. The main attractions of the town are the two active volcanoes; Sibayak, with its hot springs, and Sinabung.
