= Mereg =

Mereg مرگ
- Village
- Location within Iran
- Coordinates: 35°25′12″N 46°16′46″E
- Country: Iran
- Province: Kurdistan
- County: Marivan
- Bakhsh: Central
- Rural District: Sarkal

Population (2006)
  - Total: 372
- Time zone: UTC+3:30 (IRST)
  - Summer (DST): UTC+4:30 (IRDT)

Mereg (Persian: مرگ; also known as Mark, Merek, Merk, and Mirg) is a village in Sarkal Rural District, in the Central District of Marivan County, Kurdistan Province, Iran. As of the 2006 census, it had a population of 372, distributed among 80 families. The village is populated by Kurds.
