= Karo Regency =

Regency in North Sumatra, Indonesia

Coordinates: 3°06′N 98°30′E

Karo Regency Kabupaten Karo Tanah karo
- Regency
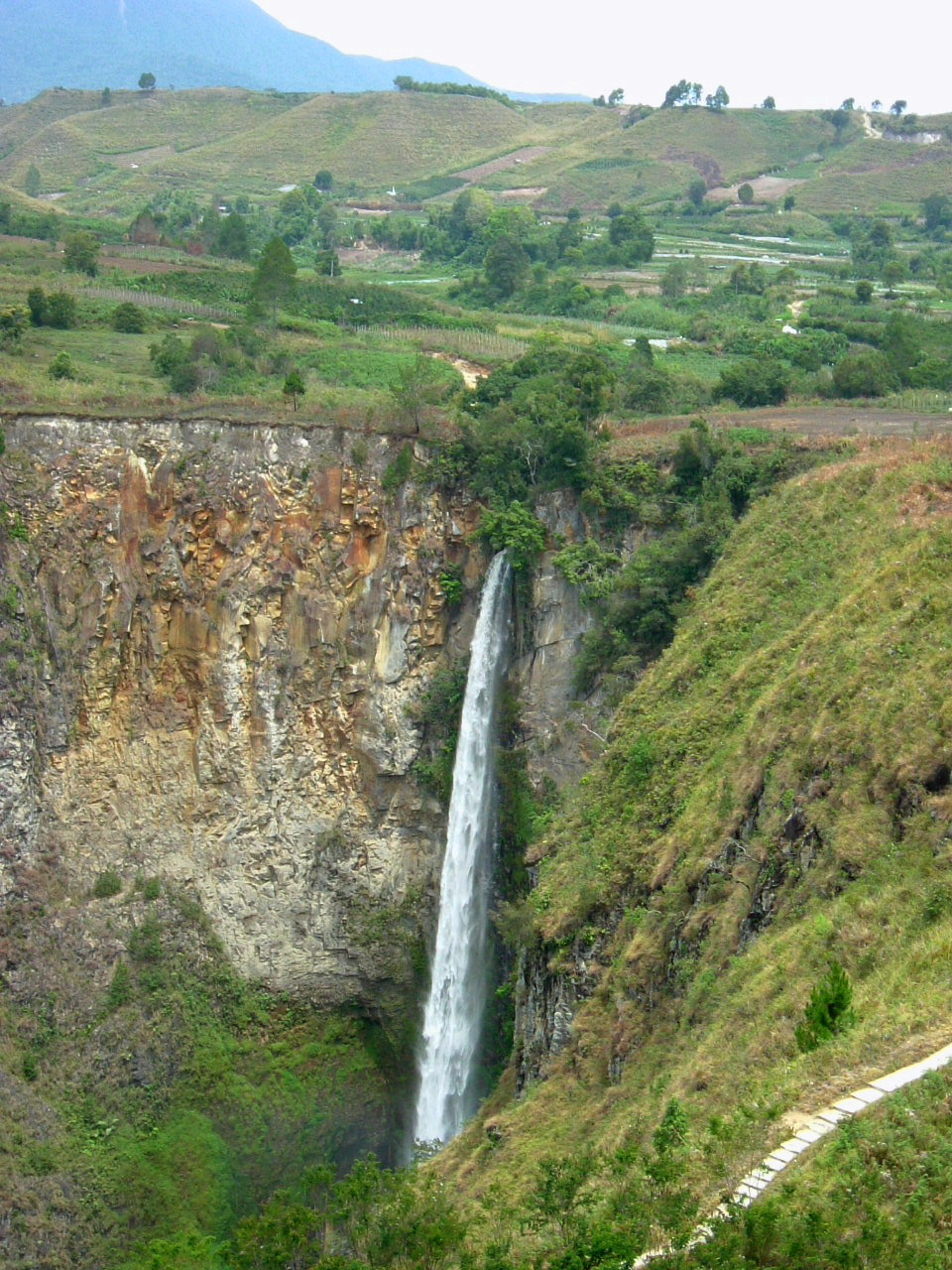
- Sipiso-Piso Waterfall in Tongging, Karo Regency

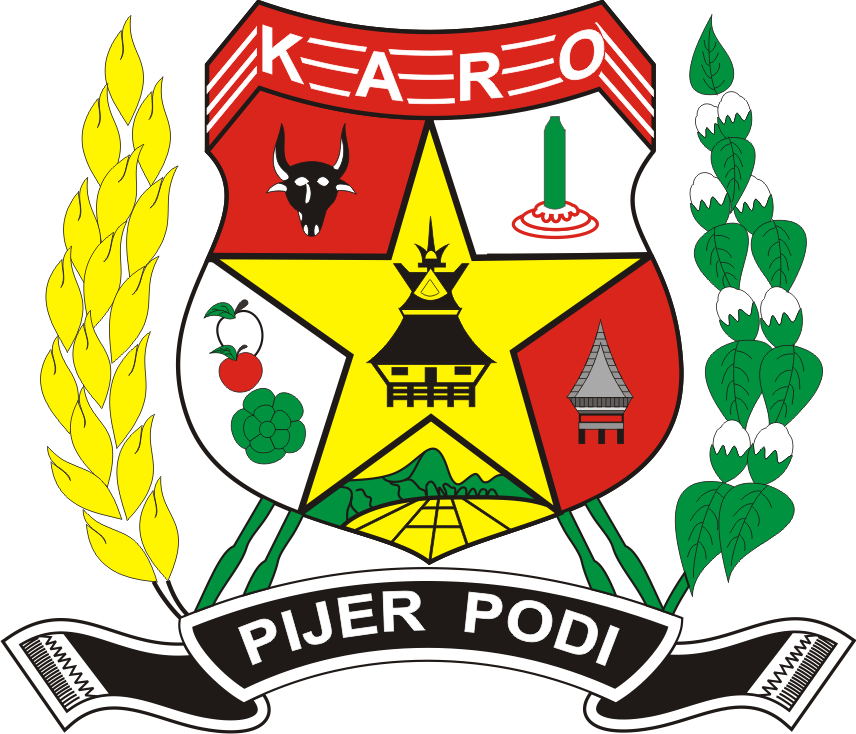
- Coat of arms
- Motto(s): Pijer Podi ("Mutual cooperation")
- Country: Indonesia
- Province: North Sumatra
- Regency seat: Kabanjahe

Government
  - Regent: Antonius Ginting
  - Vice Regent: Komando Tarigan
  - Chairwoman of Council of Representatives: Iriani Tarigan (PDI-P)
  - Vice Chairmen of Council of Representatives: Sadarta Bukit (Gerindra) and David Kristian Sitepu (Nasdem)

Area
  - Total: 2,206.88 km^{2} (852.08 sq mi)
- Highest elevation: 2,460 m (8,070 ft)
- Lowest elevation: 200 m (660 ft)

Population (mid 2025 estimate)
  - Total: 429,954
  - Density: 194.824/km^{2} (504.593/sq mi)
- Time zone: UTC+7 (WIB)
- Website: www.karokab.go.id

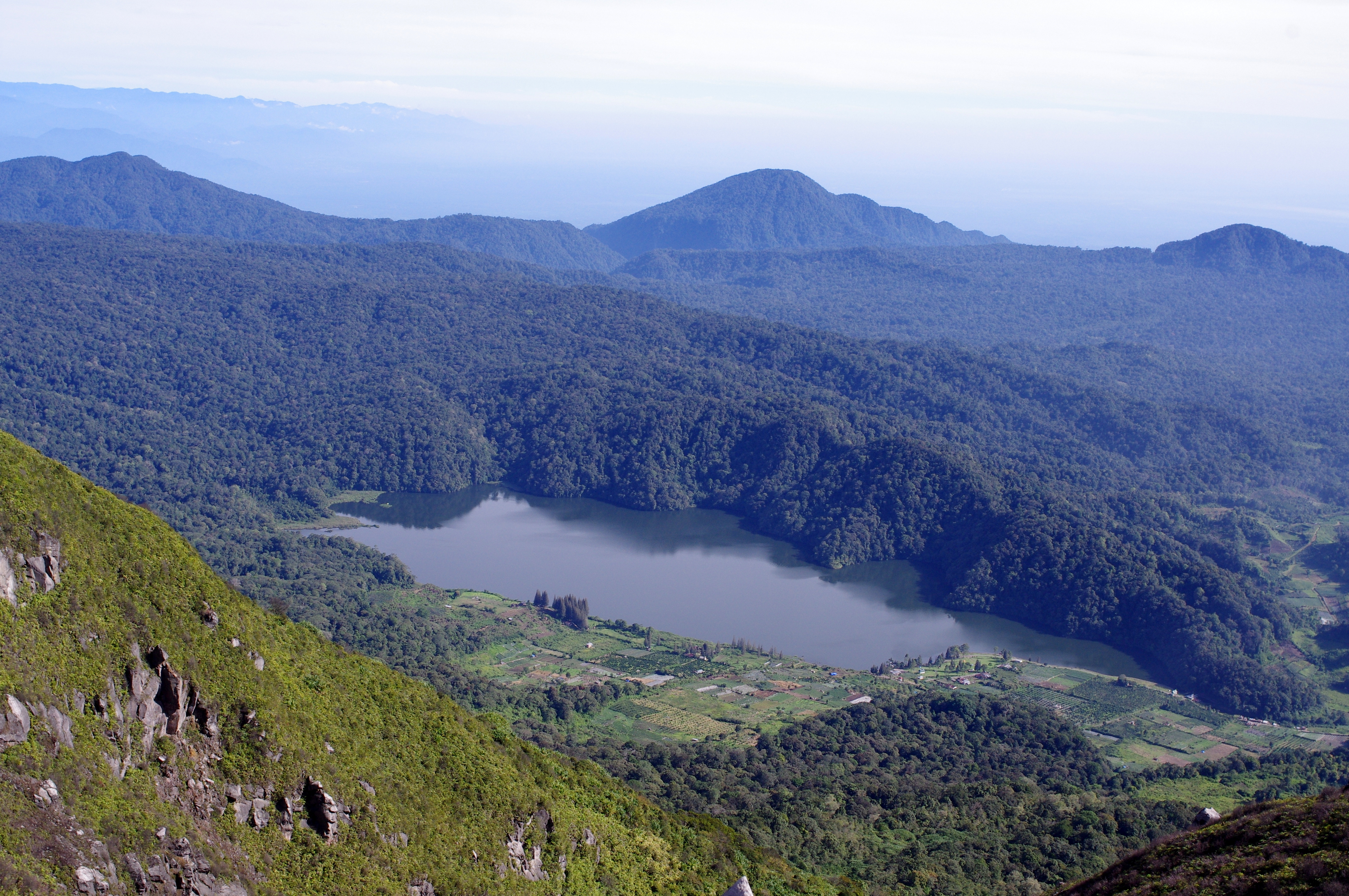
Lau Kawar Lake

Karo Regency is a landlocked regency of North Sumatra Province of Indonesia, situated in the Barisan Mountains. The regency, which was established on 7 November 1956, covers an area of 2,127.25 square kilometres (821.34 sq mi) and according to the 2010 census it had a population of 350,479, increasing to 404,998 at the 2020 Census; the official estimate as of mid 2025 was 429,954 (comprising 211,712 males and 218,242 females). 60.99% of the regency is forested. Its regency seat is the town of Kabanjahe. The Batak Karo language is spoken in the regency, as well as the Indonesian language. It borders Southeast Aceh Regency in Aceh to the west, Deli Serdang Regency and Langkat Regency to the north, Dairi Regency and Toba Samosir Regency to the south, and Deli Serdang Regency and Simalungun Regency to the east.

== Economy ==
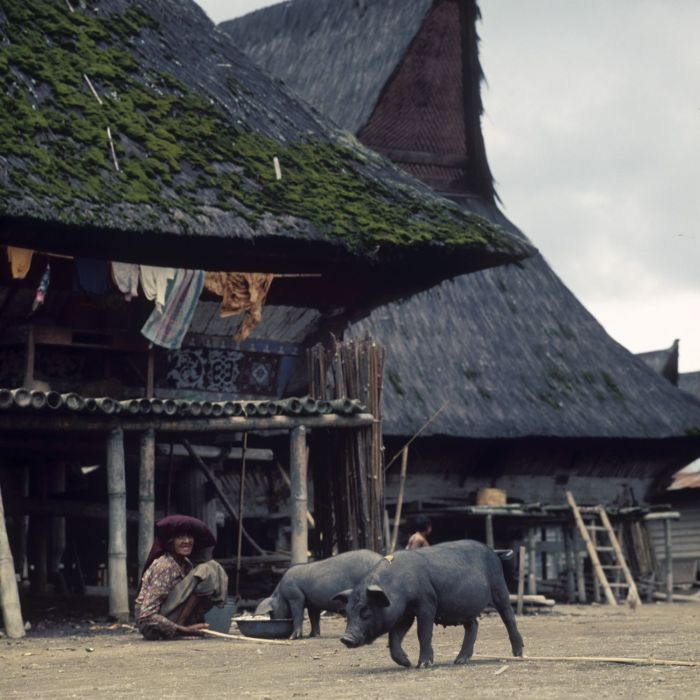
Traditional houses in Karo

The GDP per capita of Karo Regency in 2005 was 11.65 million rupiah, approximately US$1,200. 74% of the population works in agriculture, which comprises 60% of the regional GDP. The second-largest sector is government, which comprises 11% of the regional GDP.

== Administrative divisions ==
The regency is divided administratively into seventeen districts (kecamatan), tabulated below with their areas and their populations at the 2010 Census and the 2020 Census, together with the official estimates as of mid 2025. The table also includes the locations of the district administrative centres, the number of administrative villages in each district (totaling 259 rural desa and 10 urban kelurahan), and its post codes.

Kode Wilayah	Name of District (kecamatan)	Area in km^{2}	Pop'n Census 2010	Pop'n Census 2020	Pop'n Estimate mid 2025	Admin centre	No. of villages	Post code
12.06.10	Mardingding	325.30	17,062	19,954	20,328	Mardingding	12	22165
12.06.09	Laubaleng	184.16	17,713	20,652	20,767	Laubaleng	15	22164
12.06.08	Tigabinanga	176.44	19,900	22,395	23,418	Tigabinanga	20 ^{(a)}	22162
12.06.07	Juhar	220.02	13,244	14,787	15,458	Juhar Perangin-angin	25	22163
12.06.06	Munte	140.63	19,686	22,909	24,445	Munte	22	22161
12.06.13	Kuta Buluh	259.38	10,586	12,602	12,949	Kutabuluh	16	22155
12.06.11	Payung	31.36	10,837	12,249	11,630	Payung	8	22154
12.06.17	Tiganderket	67.17	13,178	14,555	15,504	Tiganderket	17	22156
12.06.12	Simpang Empat	65.13	19,015	21,355	24,241	Ndokum Siroga	17	22150
12.06.16	Naman Teran	121.89	12,796	14,622	14,436	Naman	14	22151
12.06.15	Merdeka *	42.45	13,310	15,580	16,553	Merdeka	9	22153
12.06.01	Kabanjahe	34.31	63,326	73,581	78,196	Kabanjahe	13 ^{(b)}	22111: 22115
12.06.02	Berastagi *	33.76	42,541	48,244	51,701	Berastagi	10 ^{(c)}	22152
12.06.04	Tigapanah	127.04	29,319	34,263	39,098	Tigapanah	26	22170
12.06.14	Dolat Rakyat *	22.85	8,296	9,848	10,231	Dolat Rakyat	7	22171
12.06.05	Merek	229.36	18,054	22,746	25,526	Garingging	19	22173
12.06.03	Barusjahe *	125.63	22,097	24,656	25,473	Barusjahe	19	22172
	Totals	2,206.88	350,960	404,998	429,954	Kabanjahe	269	

Notes: (a) including one kelurahan (Tigabinanga town).
(b) comprising 5 kelurahan (Gung Leto, Gung Negeri, Kampung Dalam, Lau Cimba and Padang Mas) and 8 desa.
(c) comprising 4 kelurahan (Gundaling I, Gundaling Ii, Tambak Lau Mulgap I and Tambak Lau Mulgap Ii) and 6 desa.

Note that four of these districts (indicated by "*" above), with a combined area of 224.69 km ^{2} and 103,958 inhabitants in mid 2025, constitute a part of the Medan metropolitan area.
