= Kabanjahe =

Coordinates: 3°06′N 98°30′E

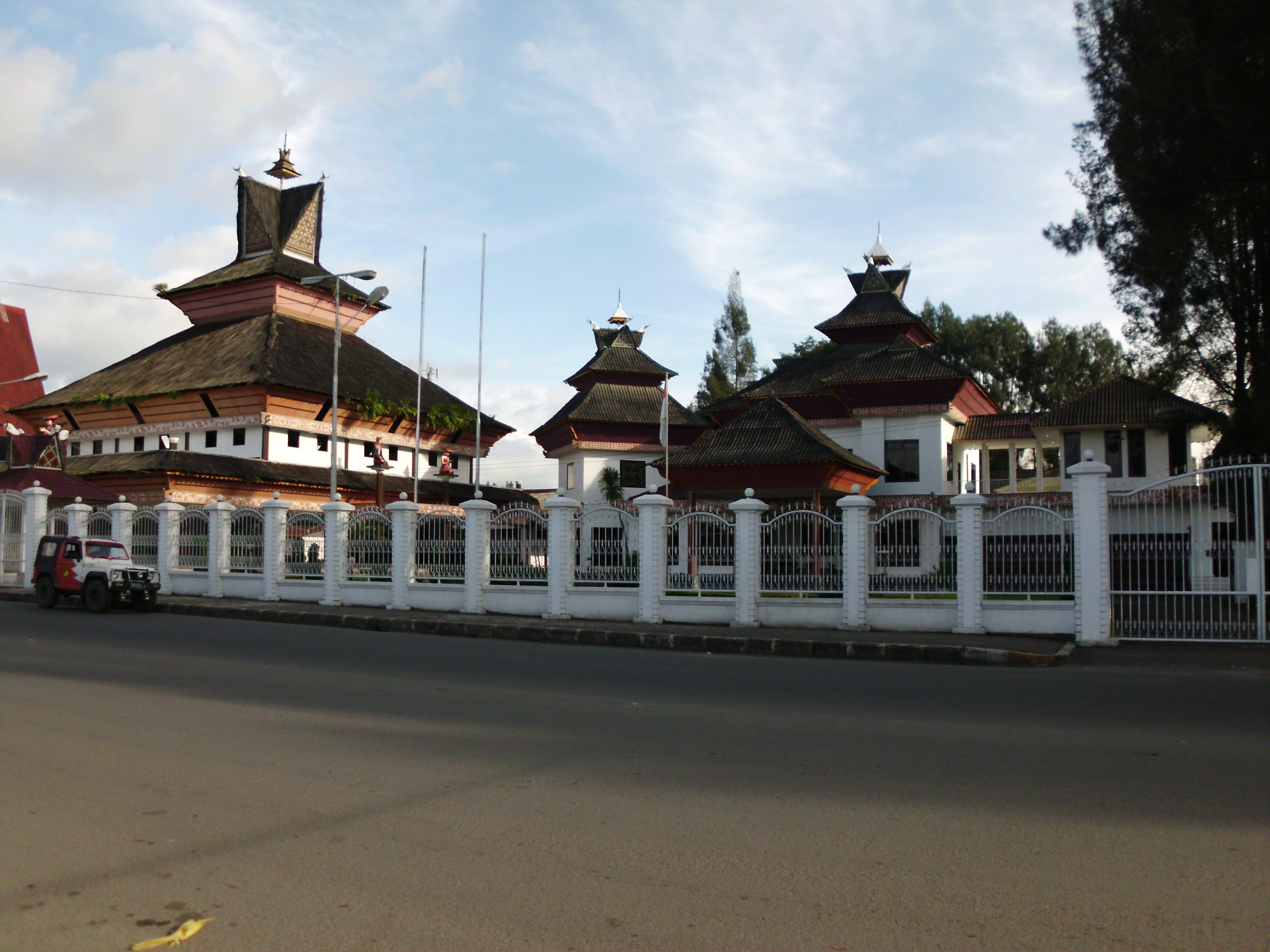
Verandah of Karo Regency

Kabanjahe is a town approximately 90 minutes from Medan, North Sumatra, Indonesia. Kabanjahe is to the south of Berastagi. Kabanjahe is the largest centre in Karo Regency. It has an area of 44.65 km^{2} and had a population of 73,581 at the 2020 Census. Frequent buses connect the town with Berastagi, and a journey takes about 15 minutes.

Most of the local people are Karo who speak the Batak Karo language. A favorite food among locals is roast pork or Babi Panggang Karo.

Kabanjahe is the seat of the government of Karo Regency. It is an education center for kindergarten through high school because most of the Karonese go to universities in outside locations, such as Medan and Jakarta. Kabanjahe is also the trade centre of Karo Regency.

== Climate ==
Kabanjahe has an elevation cooled tropical rainforest climate (Af) with moderate rainfall in June and July and heavy rainfall in the remaining months.

Climate data for Kabanjahe
Month	Jan	Feb	Mar	Apr	May	Jun	Jul	Aug	Sep	Oct	Nov	Dec	Year
Mean daily maximum °C (°F)	25.2 (77.4)	25.7 (78.3)	25.9 (78.6)	25.8 (78.4)	25.9 (78.6)	25.7 (78.3)	25.4 (77.7)	25.3 (77.5)	24.8 (76.6)	24.5 (76.1)	24.4 (75.9)	24.9 (76.8)	25.3 (77.5)
Daily mean °C (°F)	20.2 (68.4)	20.3 (68.5)	20.6 (69.1)	20.7 (69.3)	20.7 (69.3)	20.4 (68.7)	20.1 (68.2)	20.1 (68.2)	20.0 (68.0)	20.0 (68.0)	19.9 (67.8)	20.2 (68.4)	20.3 (68.5)
Mean daily minimum °C (°F)	15.2 (59.4)	15.0 (59.0)	15.3 (59.5)	15.7 (60.3)	15.6 (60.1)	15.2 (59.4)	14.8 (58.6)	14.9 (58.8)	15.3 (59.5)	15.6 (60.1)	15.5 (59.9)	15.5 (59.9)	15.3 (59.5)
Average rainfall mm (inches)	218 (8.6)	157 (6.2)	217 (8.5)	226 (8.9)	193 (7.6)	114 (4.5)	91 (3.6)	140 (5.5)	213 (8.4)	274 (10.8)	277 (10.9)	267 (10.5)	2,387 (94)
Source: Climate-Data.org

== Notable residents ==
- Rico Sempurna Pasaribu – journalist.
