= Jambur =

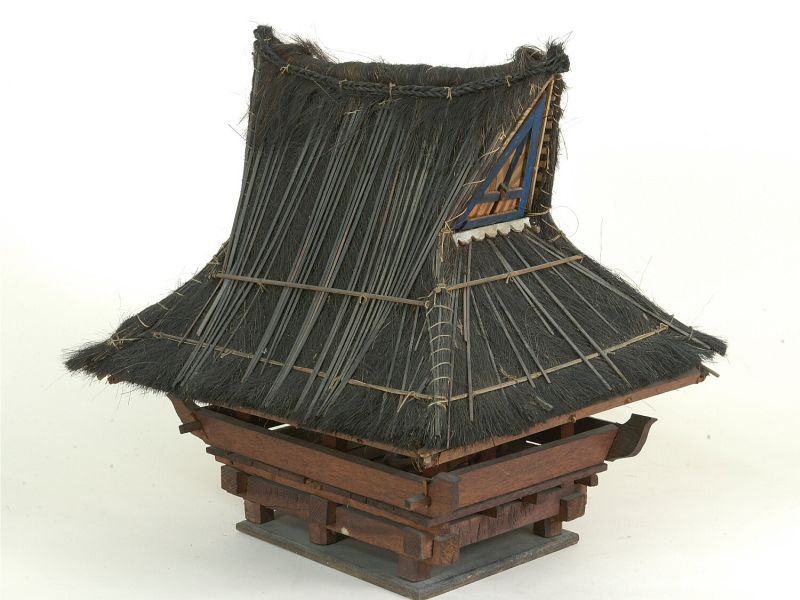
A model of a traditional jambur. Modern day jamburs used raised concrete floor instead of raised wooden platform.

A jambur is a structure that is used as a multipurpose hall by the Karo people of North Sumatra, Indonesia. The traditional jambur is a large pavilion-like structure raised above ground, wall-less, and placed under a large Karo traditional house roof style. Karo ritual ceremonies, e.g. wedding feasts, funerals, or general feasts, are held within the jambur. Jambur can still be found in big cities of North Sumatra, e.g. Medan, Kabanjahe, Berastagi, as well as small villages in the Karo lands.

== Form and evolution ==
Traditionally, a jambur is a raised platform structure, topped with a roof in the distinctive shape of the traditional house of Karo people. This complex wooden roof employs impressive king posts inside the roof, and outward sloping gable topped with buffalo horns, covered in thatch made of ijuk.

The shape of a jambur and its function as a gathering place is very similar to the geriten. The difference is that a geriten is always an ossuary structure, and relatively smaller in size compared with a jambur.

With modernity, the structure of a jambur evolved. Raised wooden platform is not preferred anymore due to its high cost of maintenance. In many Karo villages, hardened concrete floor is now used instead of wooden platform. The roof form however still follows the traditional Karo architecture, mainly to maintain the Karo identity. In large cities e.g. Medan, any kind of buildings that is used as multipurpose hall are now known as jambur.

== Use ==
As a public building, a jambur is usually built in the center of a village. A jambur is used for traditional wedding ceremonies, funeral ceremonies, chief's meeting, or cooking activities for feasts. Women sometimes did their weaving or other crafts-making in a jambur. Art performances are similarly held in a jambur. In the past, a jambur was used as a resting place, especially for male Karo youths (anak perana), who were also responsible for the security of the village at night. Young travelers from outside the village may rest in a jambur.

The large roof of a jambur is used as a storage space, e.g. to keep rice shafts.

During the 2014 eruption of Mount Sinabung, many jamburs were used as a center for disaster management activities. Due to the heavy use of jambur as a place for disaster management activities, the Deputy of the Indonesian National Board for Disaster Management nationalized the term jambur for any structure that is used for disaster management. The term is introduced in other disaster-prone area e.g. Yogyakarta in Central Java, where the normal pendopo is called a jambur if it is used as a shelter.

== See also ==
- Batak architecture

== Cited works ==
- Domineg, Gaudenz (1998). Gunawan Tjahjono (ed.). Batak Architecture of Sumatra. Indonesian Heritage. Vol. 6. Singapore: Archipelago Press. ISBN 9813018305.
- Germain, Sandrine; van der Goes, Beatrice (1998). Gunawan Tjahjono (ed.). Batak Architecture of Sumatra. Indonesian Heritage. Vol. 6. Singapore: Archipelago Press. ISBN 9813018305.
- Sitanggang, Hilderia (2006). Arsitektur tradisional Batak Karo [Batak Karo Traditional Architecture]. Jakarta: Departemen Pendidikan dan Kebudayaan.
