= Bolon house =

Traditional north sumatran house

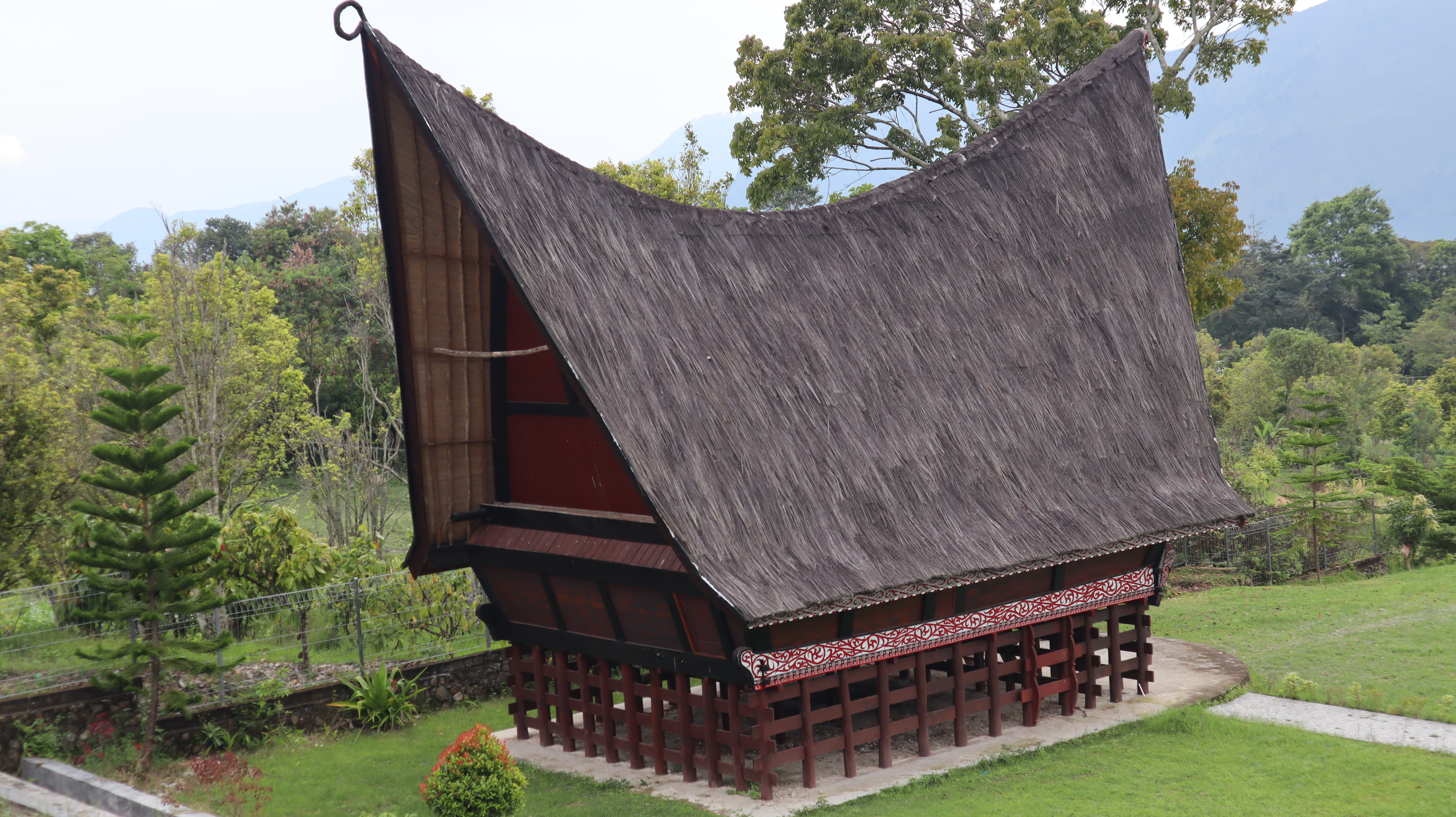
Ruma Bolon, traditional house of the Batak people

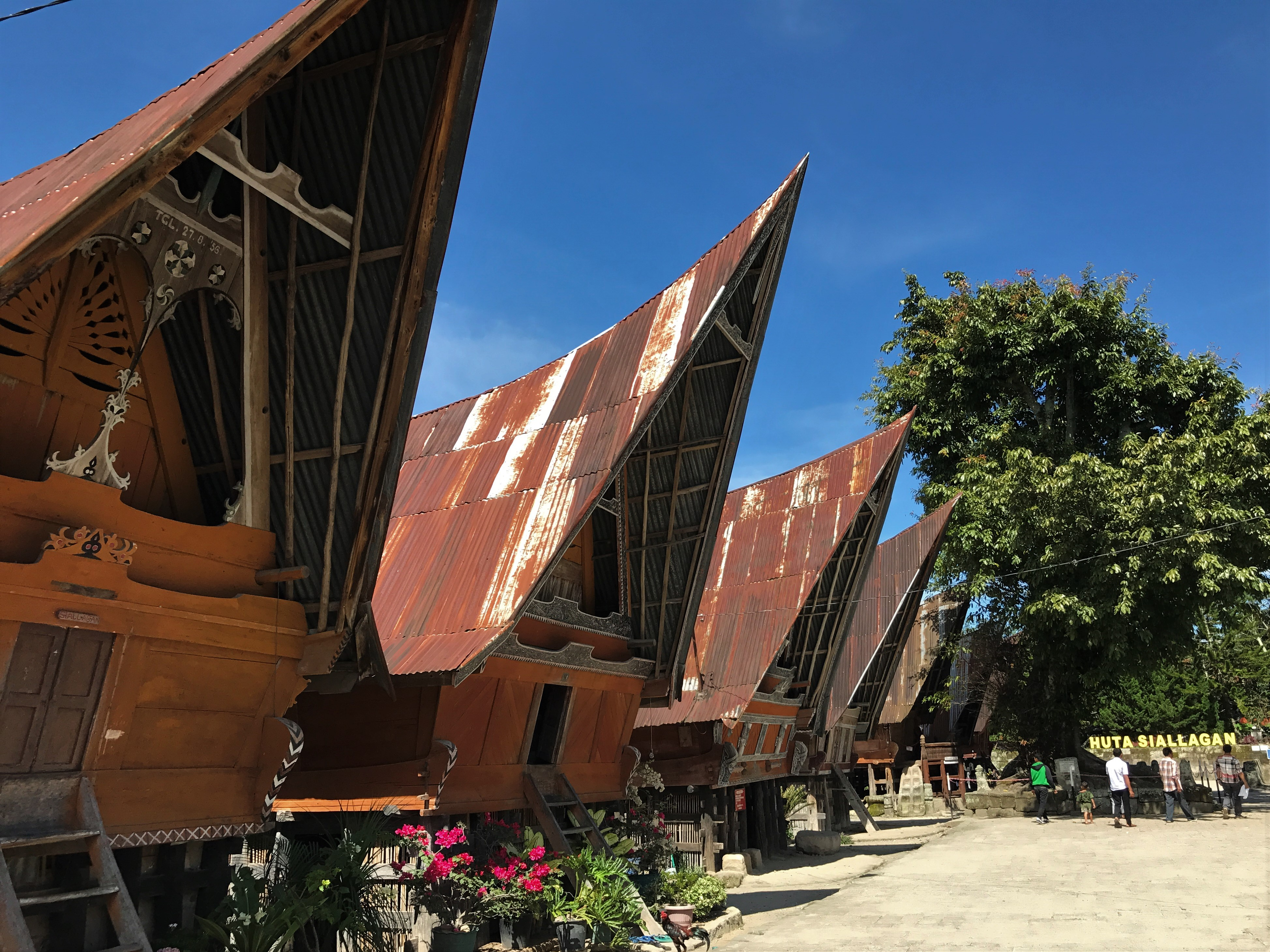
Ruma Bolon in Samosir island.

A bolon house (Batak Toba: Ruma Bolon) is a Northern Sumatra traditional house in Indonesia. Bolon houses are also tourist objects in Northern Sumatra. Bolon houses are made with wood. The house floor is made with boards. The roof is made with rumbia leaves. Bolon houses have no individual rooms, but the space inside is divided. There is space for the house leader, for family meetings, for daughters who have married but have no house of their own, and for the oldest son who has already married. This space is influenced by Batak culture. In ancient times, bolon houses used to be the place where 13 kings of Batak lived. Today, only a few bolon houses can be found in North Sumatra.

== See also ==
- Geriten
- Gorga
- Batak architecture
