= Tunggal panaluan =

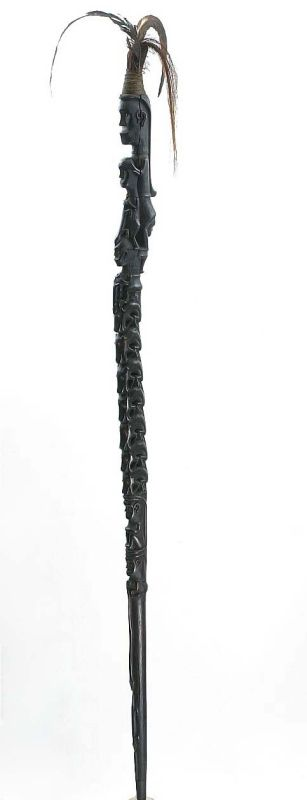
Tunggal panaluan, the magic staff of the Batak people.

A tunggal panaluan is a magic staff used by shamans of the Batak people, who live in the highlands of North Sumatra, Indonesia. Traditionally the tunggal panaluan is made from wood of a specific tree and carved with human figures and embellished with horsehair and cooked human brain, both procured from sacrificial victims.

== Shape ==
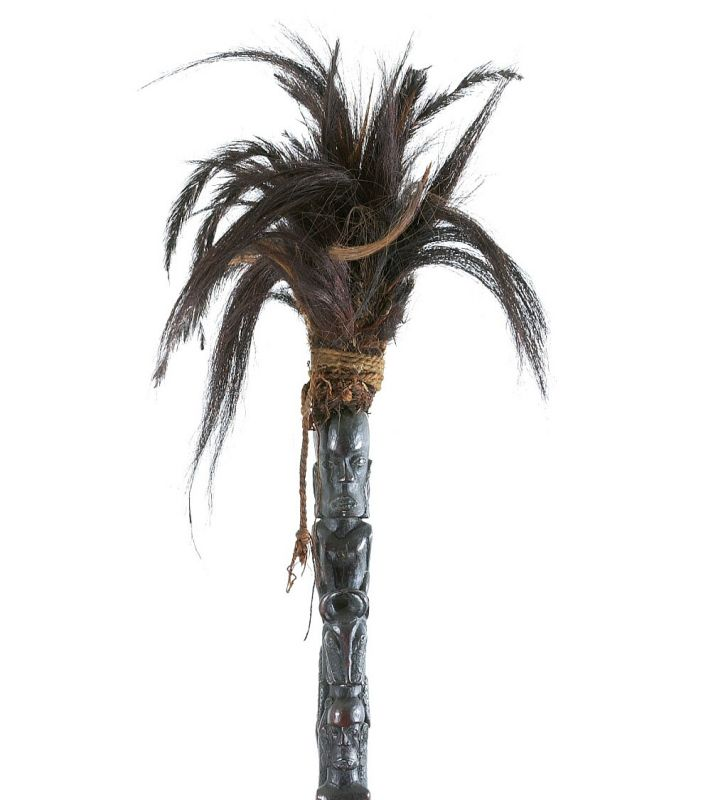
The head of the tunggal panaluan.

Tunggal panaluan was carved out of the wood of Cassia javanica, the only tree from which the tunggal panaluan can be created. The tree occupies a central place in the ancestral myth of the Batak people, as well as the figures depicted on the tunggal panaluan. Tunggal panaluan was carved with human and animal figures arranged above each other. The human figure refer to a Batak myth that tells of incestuous twins. Animals found depicted in the tunggal panaluan include snakes, dragons, geckos and water buffaloes. Another type of magic staff, known as the tunggal malehat, depicts a human riding either a horse or a mythical beast.

== Use ==
The tunggal panaluan was used in ceremonies to ward off disaster and illness as well as to cause them. To imbue the staff with magic, first the datu (shaman) has to create a hole in the staff in which a magical substance known as the pupuk is inserted. Pupuk's creation involved the putrefied remain of the mutilated body of a murdered child.

== Variation ==
Tungkot malehat is another variation of tunggal panaluan. Most tungkot malehat are manufactured and used by the Karo instead of the Toba. They have more simplistic design than the tunggal panaluan. Tunggal panaluan are elaborately carved all the way until the bottom of the staff, whereas the body of the tungkot malehat are left plain and uncarved. The only carved part of the tungkot malehat is its top part, usually carved with a human figure riding a singa or a horse. It is generally accepted that the tungkot malehat is a more recent development of the tunggal panaluan.

== See also ==
- Naga morsarang
- Porhalaan
- Pupuk
