= Sopo (structure) =

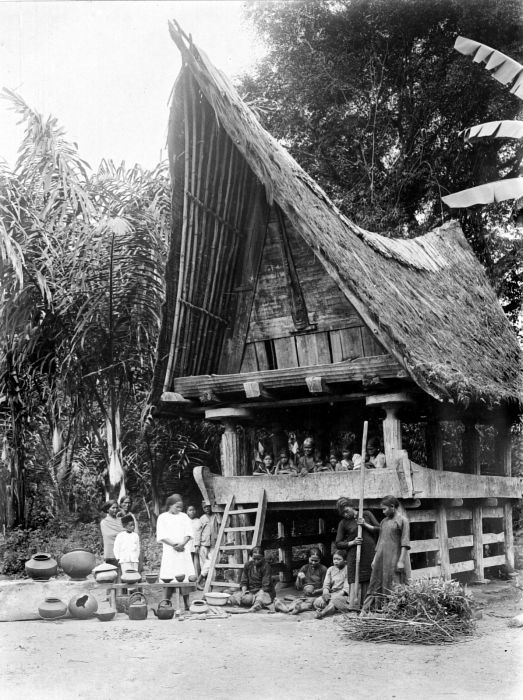
An early 20th-century picture of a sopo.

A sopo is a treasury structure in the architecture of the Toba Batak people from North Sumatra, Indonesia. Its form is similar to that of a Batak traditional house with the exception of being smaller in size and a construction ritual that is the opposite of a Batak house. Sopo is used as a repository for various items, e.g. rice, magical items, or trophies. Sopo can also be used as a meeting point for social activities.

== Description ==
The word sopo is a Batak word which indicates a structure which is used to store items, whether it is to store rice (sopo eme, eme means "rice"), war trophies (e.g. wild boar or human skulls, or the smoked and dried hands of the enemies), or magic ritual items (e.g. the pustahas or magic batons). The sopo generally has a similar appearance to the house of Batak Toba (ruma), but in the case of the sopo, it is designed as an open structure as opposed to the closed structure of a house. The pavilion-like open space is used as a public space for the villagers, to be used as temporary resting place for travelers, resting place for celibate males, or as a small forum where people would meet and talk.

During the 20th-century, many old sopo have been converted into houses by adding wooden panels around the periphery of the open space, to form an enclosed structure. These new dwellings are continued to be called sopo. Various type of sopo, original and converted, can be found in villages surrounding the southern part of the Lake Toba and on the Samosir Island. Today, most villages no longer contain a traditional, "open" sopo.

== Architecture and function ==
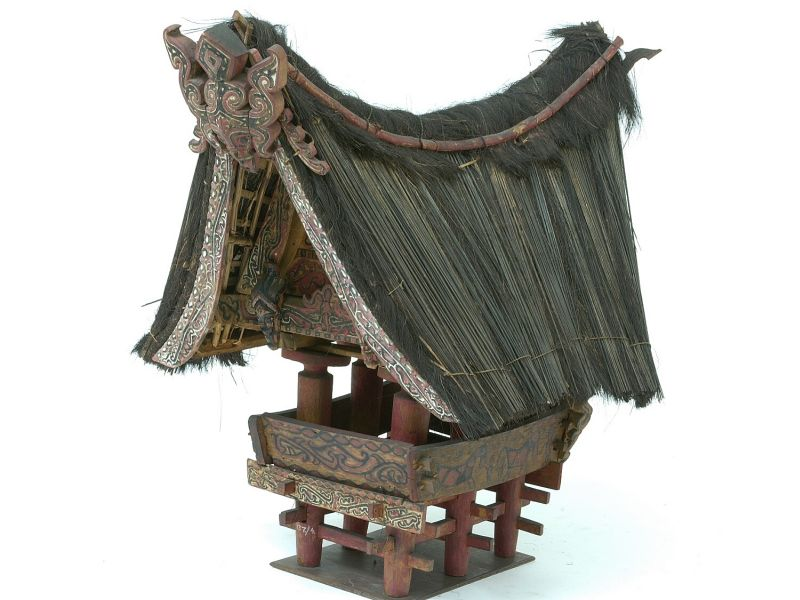
Model of a sopo of the Batak Toba. The singa decoration on top gives it an appearance of a buffalo-like creature.

Sopo is usually oriented to face the traditional Batak house in a north–south axis. Similar to the traditional Batak Toba houses (ruma), a sopo is hierarchically divided into three sections representing the three realms of the Batak Toba cosmos. The lower part is where the livestock is kept. The middle part is used as a place of rest or for women daily activities e.g. sewing. The top part is used as attic-storage.

There are different types of sopo depending on the number of its posts. A four-posted sopo is known as sopo siopat, a six-posted sopo is known as sopo sionam, eight-posted is sopo siualu while twelve-posted is sopo bolon ("great sopo"). Large-sized sopo bolon are usually built by the chief of the village, and so every Batak Toba village would have one sopo bolon located at the center of a square and exactly on the opposite side of the chief's house. A sopo bolon can still be seen in the village of Lumban Nabolon, Tapanuli Utara. This large sopo served as a meeting hall, and its attic could be used as a shrine for sacred treasures, in which case it may not always function as a granary. Smaller ordinary sopo, on the other hand, has less ornamentation and stands on the opposite side of each houses in a village. These ordinary sopo are used for storing rice.

The main posts of a sopo are supported by a stone base known as batu ojahan. Each stone base has a diameter of 40 centimetres (16 in) on its base, and tapered on top to 20 centimetres (7.9 in) in diameter. These main posts are supported by smaller posts (tiang-dang pembantu). All of the posts are bounded by anchor rails which is arranged in narrowly spaced four levels. Each of the anchor rail levels are named (from the bottom to the top): balok ransang, balok galapang, sumban and gulang-gulang. Unlike a sopo, the Batak Toba house has three layers of anchor rails instead of four.

The Batak Toba house (ruma) and the sopo are both a structure built on posts with a distinctive roof shape. Despite the similarity in appearance, structurally and architecturally they were designed as an inversion of one another. One example is the central post which supported the roof of both structures: the central post of a Batak Toba house was placed the same way as the tree would grow, with the thicker part placed in the bottom; in a sopo, the post is placed upside-down, with the thicker part of the tree placed on top. Other main differences is the obvious open structure of the sopo as opposed to the enclosed structure of the house. Batak Toba house also stands broadly with the posts spreading outward as it stood on the ground; the sopo on the other hand was designed with its post converged inward toward the center, and then it widens as it goes up toward the cantilevered attic-storage at the roof level.

The open space of a sopo is provided by a wooden platform. This wooden platform is used as a meeting point, a working place, resting place or other mundane activities. In larger sopo, the sitting platform is skirted by wooden planks that are jointed in the corners, acting as a balustrade. Simple sopo have no fence.

== Symbolism ==
The Batak Toba house and sopo are both neutral structures used by both men and women. Despite the non-exclusive use of both structures, the ruma is generally accepted to be the realm of women while the sopo is considered as the realm of men. The symbolism is evident in the Batak Toba expression ruma jabu ni boru, sopo jabu ni baoa, meaning "the ruma (house) a dwelling for women, the sopo a dwelling for men". The ruma was also said to symbolize the female buffalo, while the sopo the male buffalo, probably alluding to the shape of the roof ridge which resembles the back of the buffalo.

The sopo is a sacred structure, as the harvest was also seen as containing the spirit of an agriculture deity. A sopo in essential is more sacred in comparison with the house, and so they are treated differently. For example, a sopo is always built on a ground higher than that of the house.

In Batak Toba society, the main house is inherited to the youngest son (because he is considered to be the one that would care for his parents in their old age), while the eldest son inherits the sopo. If there are more than two sons in the family, the youngest son would receive the house's main room (jabu bona), while the eldest received the sopo.

== See also ==
- Rangkiang
- Architecture of Sumatra

== Cited works ==
- Beekman, E.M. (1988). Fugitive Dreams: An Anthology of Dutch Colonial Literature. Amherst: University of Massachusetts Press. ISBN 9780870235757.
- Domenig, Gaudenz (2013). Howell, Signe; Sparkes, Stephen (eds.). Inverted posts for the granary - The House in Southeast Asia: A Changing Social, Economic and Political Domain. Routledge. ISBN 9781136824456.
- Napitupulu, S.P. (1997). Sitanggang, Hilderia (ed.). Arsitektur Tradisional Daerah Sumatera Utara. Jakarta: Direktorat Jenderal Kebudayaan.
- Vergouwen, J.C. (2013). Keuning, J.; Scott-Kemball, Jeune (eds.). The Social Organisation and Customary Law of the Toba-Batak of Northern Sumatra. Translation. Vol. 7. Springer Science & Business Media. ISBN 9789401510356.
