= Kerja Tahun =

Annual festival in Sumatra

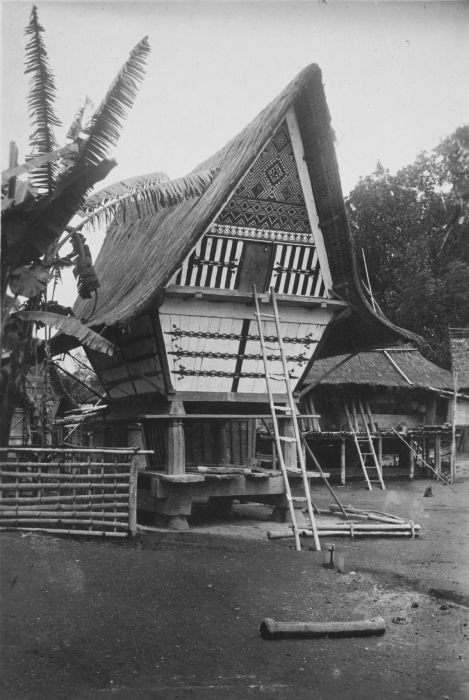
Traditional Karo rice barn, c. 1910–1930

Kerja Tahun, or Merdang Merdem, is a week-long annual festival held by the Karo people of North Sumatra to celebrate the rice-planting. 'Kerja' in this sense is a Karo word meaning 'party', and not the Indonesian 'kerja', which means work.

== History ==
Rice-planting has historically held great importance for the Karo people, rice being the staple food of the region, as well as an important source of income and indicator of wealth, in the size of one's rice barn. The Karo traditionally planted rice once per year, using dry rice (in Indonesian 'ladang') cultivation. Rice cultivation has an important role in the traditional Karo religion (known as pemena).

== Festival ==
In order to ensure the success of the rice-planting, the Merdang Merdem festival is conducted, paying homage to Beru Dayang, a female spirit also associated with childbirth, a process with which the rice planting is analogised by the Karo.

The kerja tahun festival does not have a fixed date in the Karoland, but varies by village. Despite the decline in traditional beliefs, as well as the decline in the number of people growing rice (due to modernisation and the switch to other crops), the kerja tahun festival is still widely held, but now as an activity with greater significance in terms of kinship and cultural bonds than as a religious practice.

=== Festival specifics ===
The festival lasts six days, with a seventh day of rest:

- Cikor-kor – the participants search for 'kor-kor', a specific insect found in the soil under trees. These are eaten.
- Cikurung – the participants search for 'kurung', animals of the rice fields. These are also eaten.
- Ndurung – the participants search for 'nurung', fish of the rice fields or river (no specific species of fish, just whatever happens to be found). These too are eaten.
- Mantem – 'slaughter' – livestock such as pigs, buffalo, and cows are slaughtered. Terites is cooked.
- Matana – the main day of celebration. Following four days of feasting, matana is the day for music and dancing. Gendang Guro-guro Aron music is performed, and the perkolong-kolong sing. The perkolong-kolong are skilled male and female singers performing Karonese music facing each other, often making jokes between songs. After the perkolong-kolong have performed, couples (married couples with their spouses, and those who are not yet married with their impal) from each of the five Karo marga (merga silima) (in turn) dance in the same manner.
- cimpa – on the sixth day, cimpa cakes are prepared and consumed
- Rebu – the day of rest. 'Rebu' means 'do not greet'. People stay at home after the six days of celebration, work is prohibited, and people are not allowed to talk to certain of their in-laws.
