= Geriten =

Indonesian term for ossuary

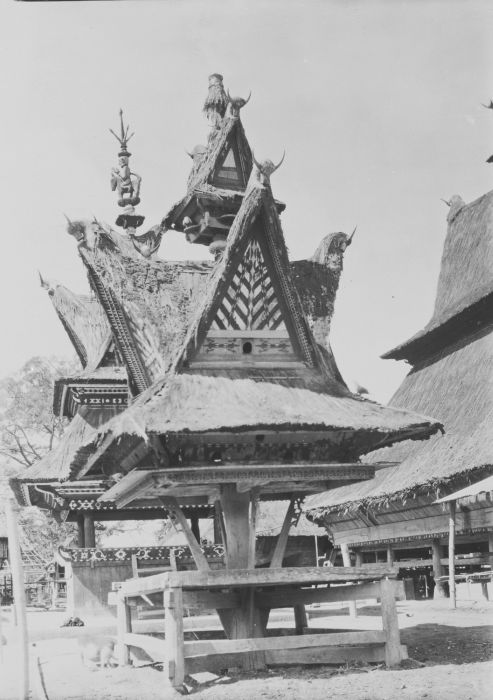
A geriten.

Geriten, or "head-house", is the skull-house of the Karo people of North Sumatra, Indonesia. It is a pavilion-like structure with a distinctively shaped roof that acted as an ossuary where the skulls of chiefs and important individuals were preserved after their deaths.

== Structure and function ==
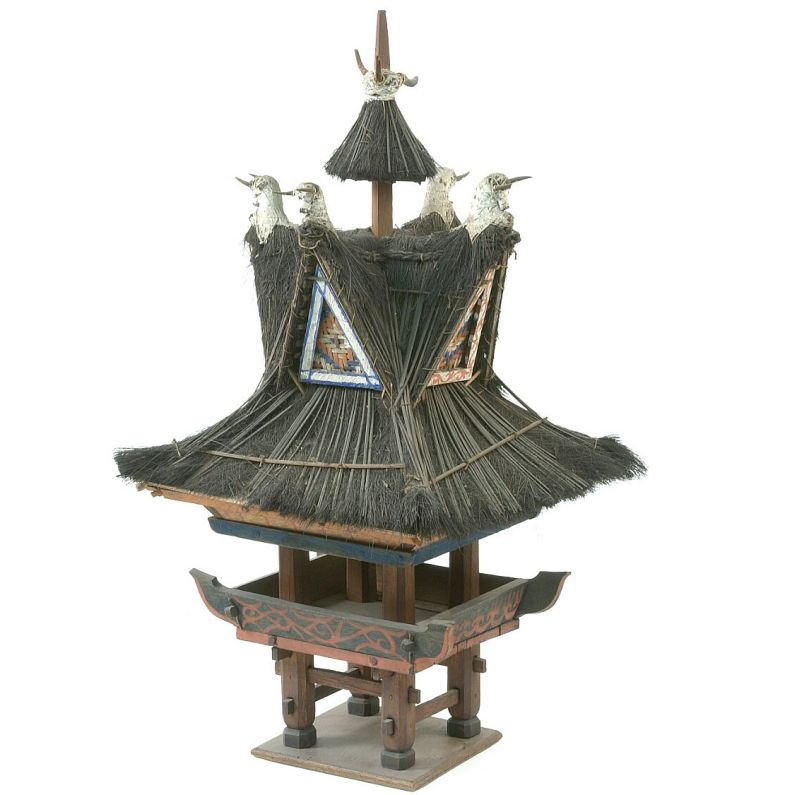
The most common type of geriten has a seating platform below its roof.

Geriten is a Batak Karo term for ossuaries. A geriten took many forms, but most commonly it is shaped as a miniature version of the Batak Karo house. A geriten may be small-sized or shaped like a pavilion where people may take a rest or do mundane activities below the roof. A geriten may also be designed on top of a Karo house as a sort of roof finial.

The most common types of geriten are those which are raised on a single or multiple posts of moderate heights; with a seating platform under its roof. This type is normally 2.5 x 2.5 meters in width. The space below the geriten is used as a meeting point for youngsters or resting place for travelers.

Geriten's roof shape is similar to Karo house architecture. The skulls of chiefs and important individuals were placed near the roof. Water buffalo figureheads were the standard ridge ornaments of Karo house roofs in general, however in mortuary structures such as the geriten, sometimes the buffalo figureheads were replaced with finely carved wooden boards representing plant motifs, or by small flags. A short distance inward of the roof-ridge, behind where the neck part of the buffalo figurehead usually rises, another plant-like carving is attached, depicted as growing upward and outward. In the middle of the ridge, two similar plant-like forms rise. A model of a geriten displayed in the Linden Museum in Stuttgart has a long vertical pole stabilized by two shorter ones in the center of the ridge. This pole is topped with a plume of ijuk fibers. A similar bunch of ijuk fibers appears on top of a tower-like mortuary structure for a Karo chief. This plume may have emphasized that the structure was intended to be visited by spirits, as opposed to the normal Karo houses.

A geriten may assume the status of a village shrine when the skulls of the village founder and his ruling male descendants and their wives are kept below its roof. In 1883, Hagen noted a geriten in the village of Nagasaribu, which was dedicated to the guardian ancestor spirit of the village.

== Decline ==
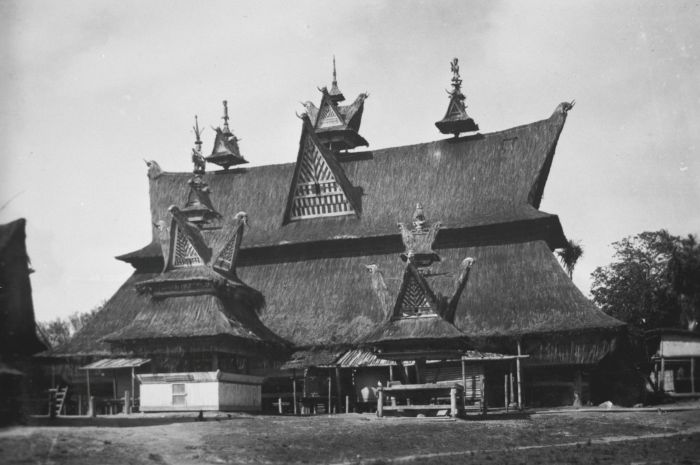
Many geriten on top of this Batak Karo housing complex served as a kind of finials in Kabanjahe, North Sumatra.

A geriten is a perishable structure. Offerings around a geriten are made only for a limited time after a person's death. Very often it became neglected after it had served in the final funeral ceremony. Many geriten were left to decay under the elements even in the late 19th-century. Larger geriten, such as those used to place the remains of the chief, were usually the only ones that were maintained by the villagers. The tradition is in decline and geritens have become a rare sight.

== See also ==
- Jambur
- Liang (building)

== Cited works ==
- Arsitektur Tradisional Batak Karo [Traditional Architecture of Batak Karo]. Departemen Pendidikan dan Kebudayaan. 1991.
- Domenig, Gaudenz (2014). Religion and Architecture in Premodern Indonesia: Studies in Spatial. Leiden: BRILL. ISBN 9789004274075.
