= Siwaluh Jabu =

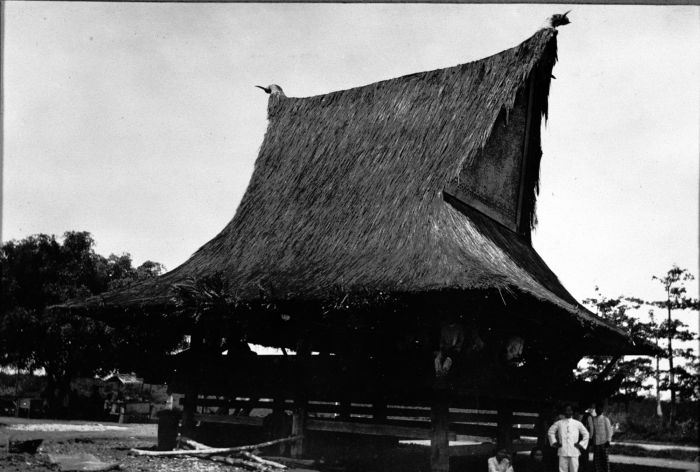
Siwaluh jabu

Siwaluh Jabu is a tribal house of the Karo people of Indonesia. Siwaluh jabu also refers to Karo people in ancient times.
