= Cimpa =

Several kinds of cake in Sumatra

Cimpa are a variety of related cakes cooked by the Karo of North Sumatra, made of rice flour, coconut and palm sugar.

Four varieties of cimpa are produced:

- Cimpa tuang - made from rice flour, grated coconut, palm sugar, and water. The mixture is made into a batter, which is fried like a pancake
- Cimpa unung-unung - made from purple glutinous rice flour, grated coconut, palm sugar, and water. The ingredients are mixed into a dough, and are placed into individual singkut-leaf wrappers (singkut is a plant from the genus curculigo in the family of hypoxidaceae).
- Cimpa bohan - made using purple glutinous rice flour, palm sugar, and grated coconut, cooked inside bamboo
- Cimpa matah

Cimpa are traditionally consumed on the sixth day of the Kerja Tahun festival.
