= Batak architecture =

Architecture from North Sumatra, Indonesia

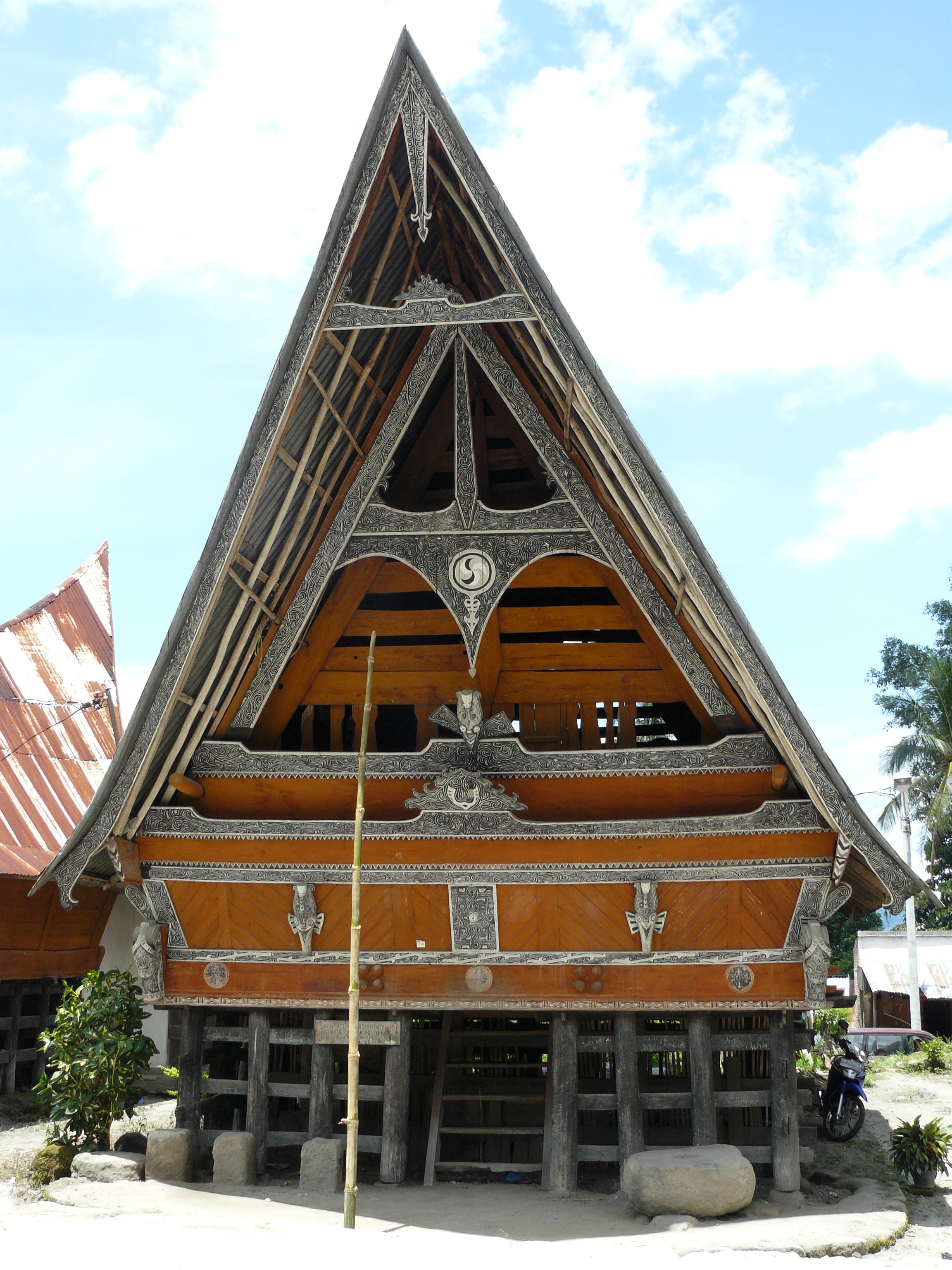
A jabu - Toba Batak house

Batak architecture refers to the related architectural traditions and designs of the various Batak peoples of North Sumatra, Indonesia. Six groups of Batak speak separate but related languages: the Angkola, the Mandailing to the south, the Toba, to the north the Pakpak/Dairi, the Simalungun, and the Karo. While the groups are now Muslim or Christian, elements of the ancient Batak religion remain, particularly amongst the Karo.

The bale ("meeting hall"), rumah ("house"), and sopo ("rice barn") are the three main building types common to the different Batak groups. The rumah has traditionally been a large house in which a group of families lives communally. During the day, the interior is a shared living space, and at night, cloth or matting drapes provide families with privacy. Most Batak now live in modern homes, and many traditional houses are abandoned or in a poor state of repair.

The architecture and village layouts of the six Batak groups also show significant differences. Toba Batak houses, for example, are boat-shaped with intricately carved gables and upsweeping roof ridges. Karo Batak houses rise up in tiers. Both are built on piles and are derived from an ancient Dong-Son model.

== Villages ==
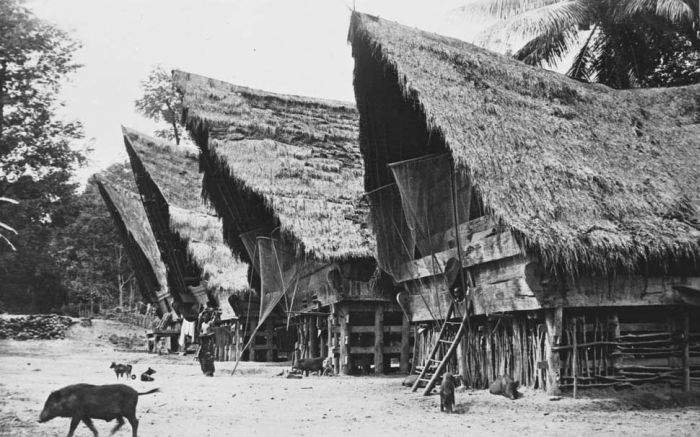
Toba Batak village

The Toba and Karo Batak live in permanent villages and cultivate irrigated rice and vegetables. On the other hand, the Angkola, the Mandailing, and the Pakpak practiced slash-and-burn agriculture which required frequent changes of location and their villages were only semi-permanent.

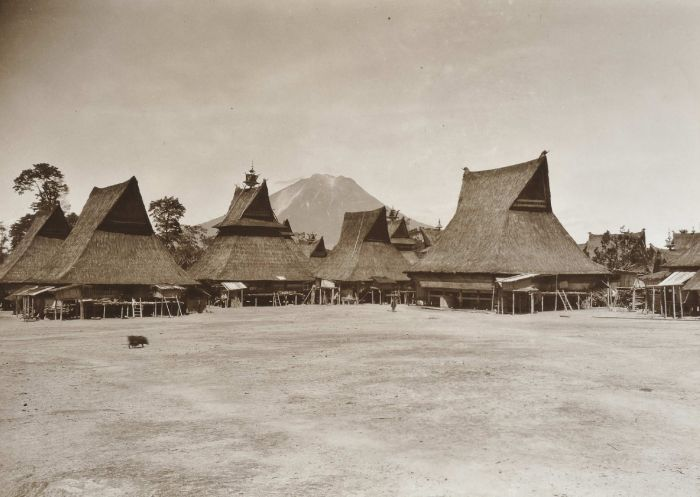
Karo Batak village

Irrigated rice cultivation can support a large population, and the Toba and the Karo live in densely clustered villages, which are limited to around ten homes to save farming land. Unirrigated slash-and-burn agriculture supported smaller villages with only several houses. All villages are located near watercourses and fields. Internecine Batak warfare before the twentieth century saw villages sited in easily defensible positions. High bamboo stockades fortified Pakpak villages and barriers of earthen ramparts with bamboo fencing and trees.

Each Batak group has its own rules and traditions guiding the village layout. Toba Batak houses are laid-out side by side with their front gables facing the street. Traditionally, each house would have had a rice barn granary opposite which would be a complementary row in the village. The street formed between the row of houses and the row of granaries is known as the alaman and is used as an area for the drying of rice. The Mandailing also build their houses in rows, however, like the Minangkabau the front gable faces the neighbouring house's rear gable. The Karo and the Pakpak do not lay their houses out in streets but around village focal points such as the meeting hall (bale) or rice-pounding house (lesung).

== Toba architecture ==
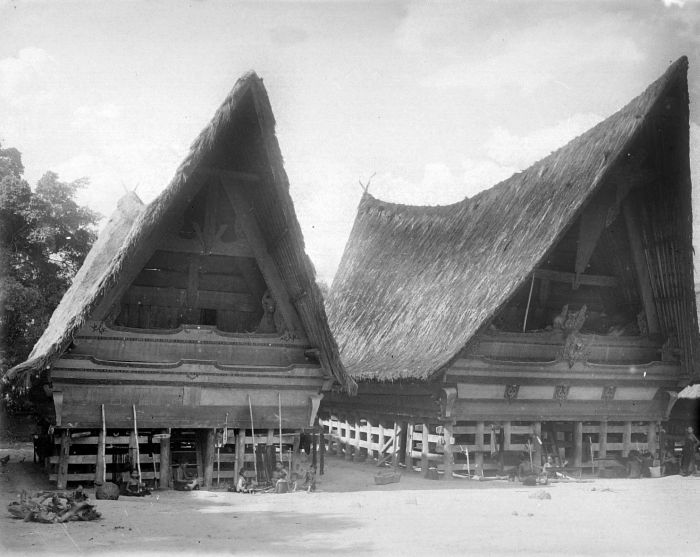
Toba Batak houses near Lake Toba

Batak Toba culture centres on Lake Toba and the sacred island of Samosir that lies within it. Jabu is the Toba language word for rumah adat. The houses are made up of three sections. A substructure of large wooden pillars resting on flat stones (or concrete nowadays) protects the structure from rising dampness. Some of these pillars support longitudinal beams known as labe-labe, which run the length of the house at head height to carry the massive roof. Other pillars carry two large beams with carved singa heads which, with two lateral beams mortised into them, form a great ring beam bearing the small living area. The substructure is strengthened by beams mortised into the piles which double as night stalls for cattle. Walls are lightweight and lean outwards and provide additional stability to the structure. The wall and the wall plate supporting the rafters hang from the labe-labe with rattan cord, while the base of the wall sits on the ring beam. The rafters spring from the wall plate and are angled outwards producing the roof curve. Instead of horizontal bracing battens, diagonal ties—running from the middle of the labe-labe to the gable ends—provide reinforcement.

The large steeply pitched saddle back roof dominates the structure. The roofs are traditionally thatched, and with no internal roof trusses, they provide a large internal space. Sharply projected triangular eaves and gables overlap all around the substructure. The front gable extends further than the rear gable and is finely carved and painted with motifs of suns, starts, cockerels, and geometric motifs in red, white, and black. The rear roof remains plain.

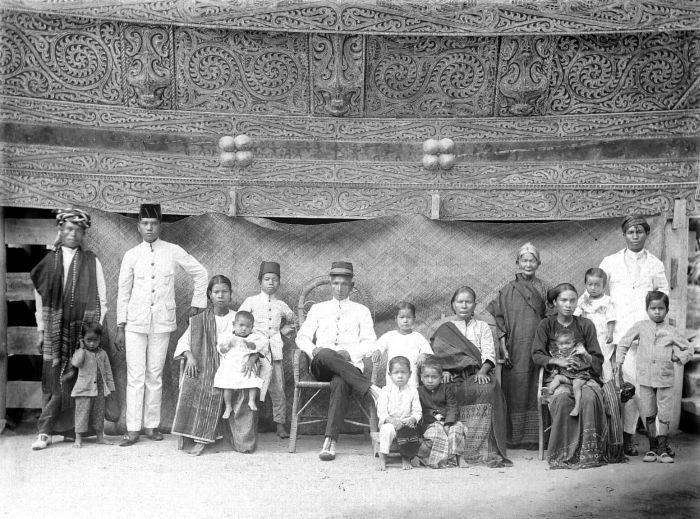
Toba Batak's extended family alongside their intricately carved jabu house. c. 1900

The living area, which is supported by lateral and transverse beams, is small and dark. Light enters through a small window on each of the four sides. The inhabitants spend most of their time outdoors and the house is largely used for sleeping. A flat wooden ceiling over the front third of the living area provides an attic space. Family heirlooms and sometimes shrines are stored here. Traditionally, the Toba Batak would cook over a hearth at the front of the living room making the living area smoky. With recent changes in hygiene practises, the kitchen is now often in an extension at the rear of the house.

The original Toba Batak houses were large communal houses, but these have now become rare, with most houses now built in the ethnic Malay style with both modern and traditional materials. While more spacious, better ventilated, brighter, and cheaper to build, the jabu is considered more prestigious. Where jabu are still lived, they are generally smaller single-family dwellings. Whereas previous versions of the jabu were accessed through a trap door concealing steps in the floor, times are now less dangerous, and more convenient wooden ladders at the front of the house provide access.

Toba Batak rice barns (sopo) were built in a similar style but are smaller than the jabu. Rice was stored within the roof and was supported by six large wooden pillars, which carried large wooden discs to prevent rodent ingress. The open platform beneath the roof structure was used as a working and general storage space and as a sleeping place for guests and unmarried men. Rice barns are now rarely used for grain storage, and many have been converted to living areas by walling off the open-air section between the sub-structure and the roof and adding a door.

== Karo architecture ==
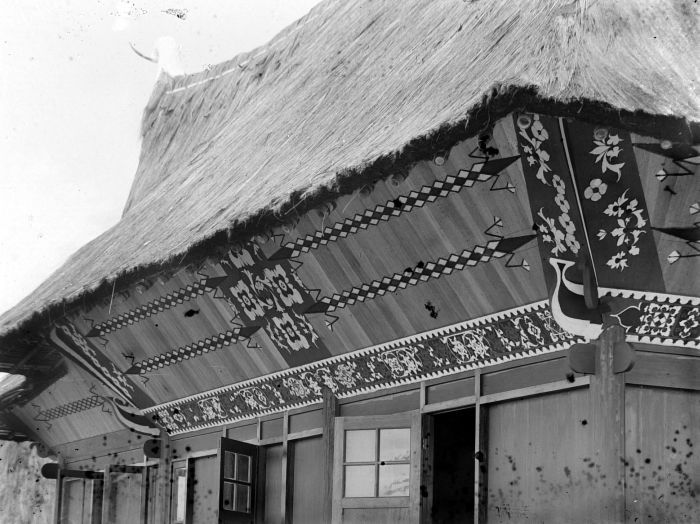
Geometric ornamentation on Karo house c. 1914–1919. Each design has a specific meaning or power. Note the stylised cicak (gecko) along the length of each wall

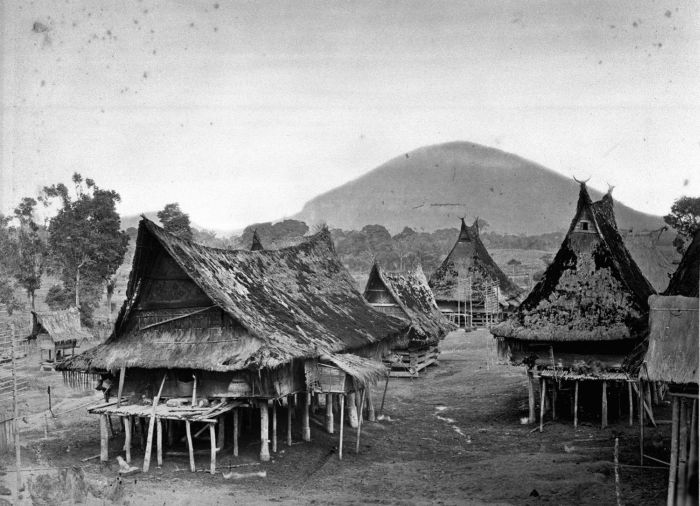
Karo houses beru-beru (hip and saddle), c. 1870

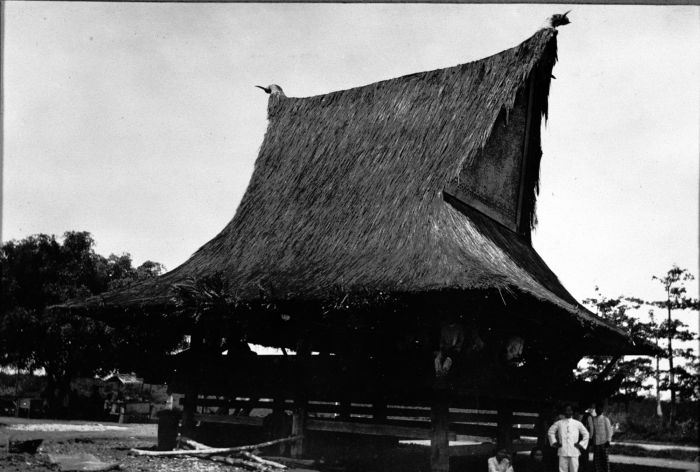
Karo house tesek (extra tier)

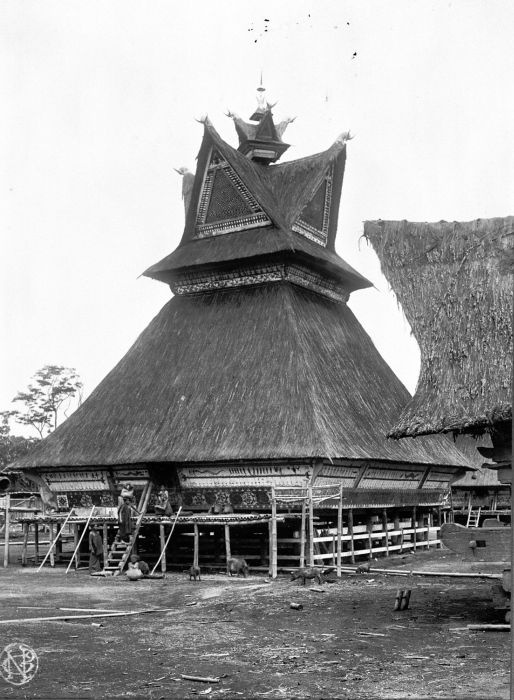
Karo rumah anjong-anjong (miniature house above it as adornment) and si empat ayo (two saddle roofs at right angles)

The Karo rumah adat (traditional house), known as 'Siwaluh Jabu', is, as with the Rumah Aceh, oriented north–south, possibly for shelter from the sun.

Karo rumah adat are longhouses, for multiple-family occupancy, up to twelve families in some areas, though usually eight. A Karo longhouse would be large, to accommodate so many families, and is built on stilts.

The houses are constructed from wood, and bamboo, using ijuk fibres for binding (no nails or screws are used) and for the thatched roof. The design is naturally earthquake-resistant.

To choose a suitable site for the house, the guru (witch doctor) would be consulted, who would determine whether the land was bad or good. A plot would be staked out using coconut fronds, and other villagers would be given four days to object to the proposed construction.

After the four-day period had elapsed, a hole was dug in the centre of the plot, into which was placed a knife, betel leaf, and rice. The guru and the kalimbubu and anak beru would perform rites to determine that the ground was suitable.

After the site was ready, a seven-day ceremony was performed, consulting the spirits of the forest (for wood) and arranging payment for the craftsmen responsible for creating the decoration of the house.

All the occupants of the village would then erect the pillars supporting the house, after which they would eat together.

The colours used in Karo designs are red, white, and black. The red signifies a zest for life, a 'get-up-and-go', the colour seen in traditional clothes used in weddings, black the colour of death, man's ignorance of Dibata's (God) will, and white, the colour of God's holiness.

Ornamentation is fundamental in Karo houses, with Buffalo horns an essential decoration of the rumah adat, and two white-painted horns are mounted on each end of the roof (the mounting is done in the night, so nobody sees), using both male and female buffalo. Ornaments in Karo houses served traditionally to protect the residents from evil spirits, and to demonstrate the status of the owner. With the fading of traditional religious beliefs (permena), they are now largely decorative and a reminder of past cultural traditions.

Ornaments of Karo homes are found in three ways:

- The house is decorated with braided bamboo in a variety of geometric designs. The geometric designs have been classified into seventeen types, each having special magic properties, such as the Tupak salah Silima-lima (five-pointed star), symbolising the merga silima, and deterring those who would try to upset the integrity of it.
- The kitchen is decorated with carvings
- An intaglio-carved gecko protects the occupants from evil spirits

=== Roof ===
The roof of the Karo house is different from other Batak people, being a hip roof. The roof is the dominant feature of the house, sometimes being as tall as 15 metres high, against the supports and walls, both around 1.5 metres each.

The most basic house, known as rumah beru-beru, has a basic hip and saddle roof. The rumah tersek has a double-storied roof with a saddle roof on top of the lower part. This improves ventilation in the house, reducing the impact of cooking smoke. A house with four gables, known as a si empat ayo has two saddle roofs crossed at right angles. In some cases, an anjong-anjong, or miniature house, may be placed atop the house for further decoration

=== Internal organization ===
The Karo adat house has two entrances, on the north and south ends, with a small terrace (ture) on each and stairs leading up to the house. The ture serves as a place to bathe children and to chat at night.

The traditional eight-family Karo longhouse contained four kitchens, each shared between two close families, and containing two stoves each. The stoves were made using five stones as a symbol of the Karo merga silima (five Marga).

The house was structured so that the pengulu (leader) of the house occupied the front-left room, with his sembuyak (parents) in the room to the right. In a mirror image, his anak beru and kalimbubu would occupy the corresponding rooms entering from the rear of the house. The four rooms in the middle of the house were of lower status and each contained a kitchen, which was shared with the rooms on their outside.

=== Keben ===
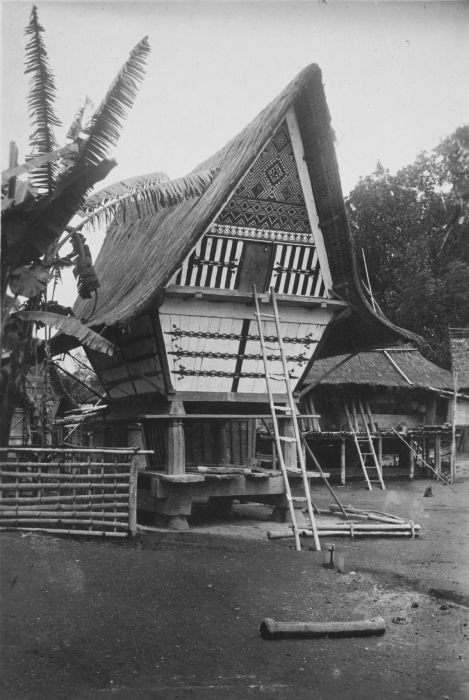
Traditional Karo keben (rice house), c. 1910-1930

The keben or rice barn is an important part of Karo culture, since rice represents a store of wealth, and the size of the keben therefore demonstrates one's wealth.

== Gallery ==
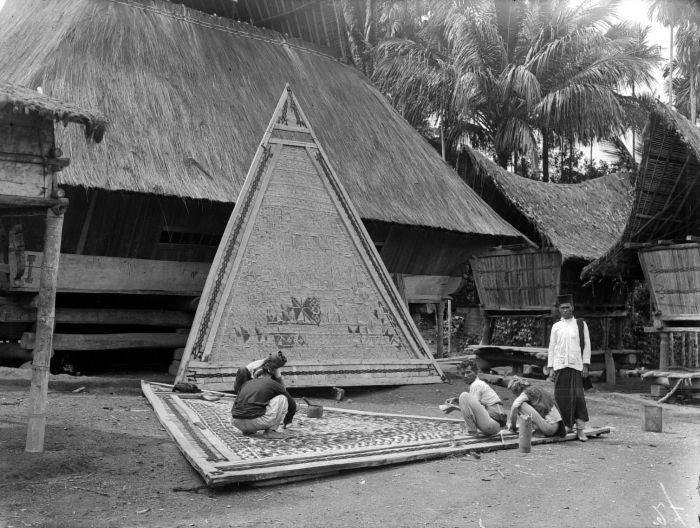
The painting of the interweaving of two "ajo", the interlaced triangles intended for the roofing of a traditional Karo house.

== See also ==
- Architecture of Sumatra
- Architecture of Indonesia
- Vernacular architecture
