= Tarigan =

Tarigan is one of the five major clans of the Karo people (Indonesia). This clan is believed to originate from the villages around Lake Toba, North Sumatra, Indonesia. They are known as a nation of Umang. This clan has fifteen subclans.
