= Mbaba belo selambar =

Marriage ritual in Karo Regency, Indonesia

Mbaba Belo Selambar is a rite performed by both men and women one month before their wedding day in Karo Regency, Indonesia. It represents a series of rites of marriage and social life of the Karo.
