= Rakut Sitelu =

Kinship system of the Karo people of Indonesia

Rakut Sitelu is a kinship system of the Karo people of Indonesia. There are three titles in the rakut sitelu, namely kalimbubu (bride's family), sembuyak or senina (parents), and anak beru (groom's family).
