= Porhalaan =

Traditional calendar of the Batak people

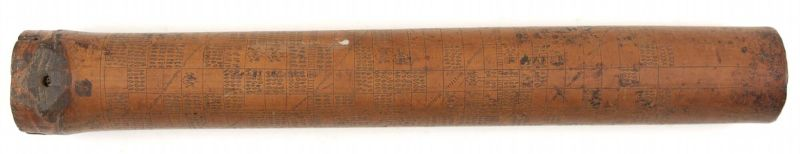
The porhalaan (Batak calendar) written on a bamboo.

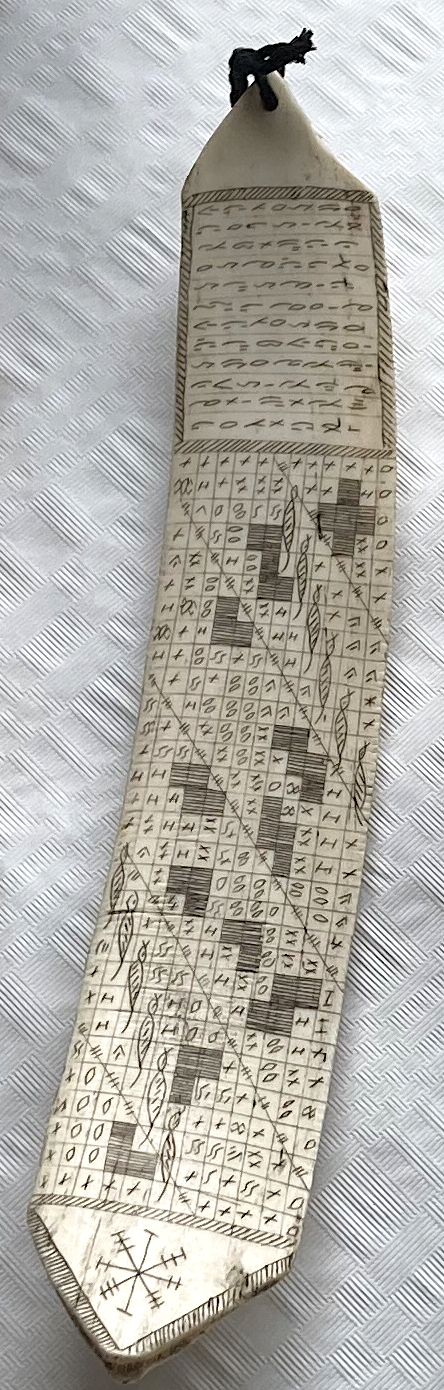
Parhalaan carved from animal bone

Parhalaan carved from wood and pieces of bamboo

The Porhalaan (Batak languages: Parhalaan, Batak script: ᯇᯒ᯲ᯂᯞᯀᯉ᯲) is the traditional calendar of the Batak people of North Sumatra, Indonesia. The Batak Calendar is a lunisolar calendar consisting of 12 months divided to 30 days with an occasional leap month. The Batak calendar is derived from Hindu calendar. The Batak people do not use the porhalaan as a mean to tell time, but rather to determine auspicious day, which is only used by the Batak traditional priest (datu) or shaman (sibaso).

== Ritual ==
The cover of Pustaha Parhalaan

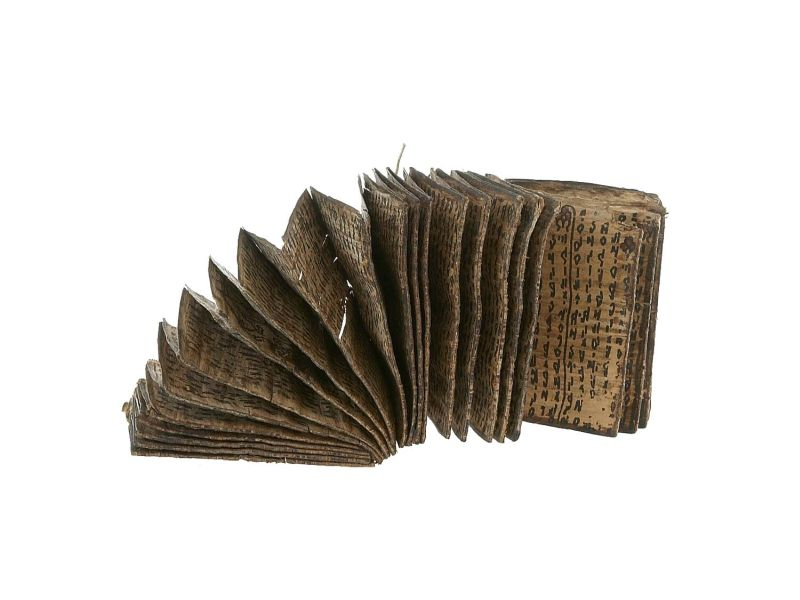
Pustaha Parhalaan, made from tree bark, usually used by the traditional priest (datu) to determine auspicious and inauspicious days and months

The name porhalaan came from the word hala, which is derived from Sanskrit kala, "scorpion", as the practice put observation of constellations into account. The porhalaan is used by the Batak people for divination. Batak people did not use the porhalaan for telling time. The responsibility of interpreting the porhalaan fell solely to the chief male ritualist known as the datu. The datu would read the porhalaan to determine which day is considered auspicious or inauspicious to hold a certain ritual.

In order to minimize the risk of accidentally selecting an unfavorable day due to errors in calendar management, days are often chosen based on whether the day is able to promise happiness in two months time, probably the current month and the following one. There is often an extra 13th month in the calendar that serves this purpose, originally a Hindu leap year, but in the Batak context, it is used for a different reason. If the additional 13th month is not available, then the first month is simply used again for protection. Whether the 13th month is used to compensate for the difference to the solar year is not proven in the context of Batak society.

The Porhalaan is usually written as a table of square boxes of 30 columns (days) of 12 or 13 rows (months) as recorded in the pustaha, the Batak magic book. Sometimes the porhalaan is written on a cylindrical piece of bamboo.

The Porhalaan is the clearest example of the Batakization of Hindu culture. The original Hindu Calendar was borrowed, modified and reworked according to Batak empirical and pragmatic principles. The result is a simplification of the original calendar. All that remains of a complicated system of adjusting lunar months to the solar Zodiac is a divination calendar which is not used for the purpose of telling times.

== Calendar system ==
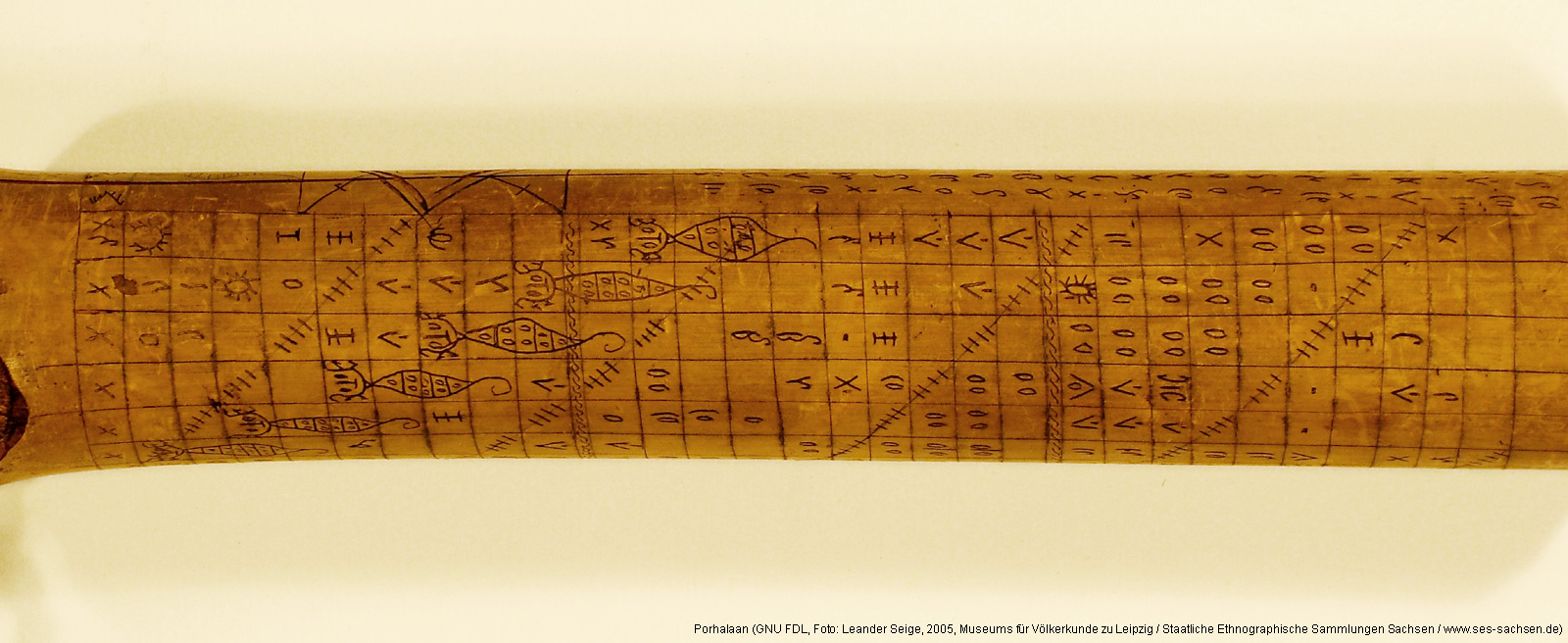
Porhalaan written on bamboo

There is no designation of year in Batak Calendar. New Year begins on the New Moon in May, when the constellation Orion (siala sungsang) vanishes in the west and the constellation Scorpius (siala poriama) rises in the east.

Porhalaan is divided into 12 months, each contains 30 days. Each month was named by its number, the first month is called simply "first month" or bulan si pahasada, second month is bulan si pahadua, etc. The eleventh month is called bulan li, while the twelfth month is named bulan hurung. The first day of each month (bona ni bulan) fell directly one day after the New Moon. The Full Moon usually fell on the 14th or 15th day.

Porhalaan do not use the term for "week", but each month is divided into four each containing seven days. The name of each of the seven days was borrowed from the Sanskrit name. The first day is called Aditya ("sun"), the second Soma ("moon"), Anggara (Mars), Budha (Mercury), Brihaspati (Jupiter), Syukra (Venus), and Syanaiscara (Saturn). In the porhalaan way of naming days, the name of the day in the context of '30 days of a month' is maintained. For example, the third day in a month which fell on Tuesday is known Nggara telu uari. sixth day is Cukera enem berngi, ninth is Suma na siwah, tenth is Nggara sepuluh, and so on. The 7th, 14th, 21st, and 28th day is named after the moon phase, that is bělah (first quarter waxing moon), bělah purnama (full moon), bělah turun (third quarter waning moon), dan mate bulan (dead moon). The word pultak ("increasing") is added to the bright fortnight days of the porhalaan when the moon phase grows, while the word cěpik ("decreasing") is added to the dark fortnight days of the porhalaan when the moon phase decreases; this is obviously influenced by the Hindu shukla pasha and krishna paksha.

== See also ==
- List of calendars

== Cited works ==
- Kozok, Uli (2009). Surat Batak: sejarah perkembangan tulisan Batak : berikut pedoman menulis aksara Batak dan cap Si Singamangaraja XII (PDF) (in Indonesian). École française d'Extrême-Orient. ISBN 9789799101532.
- Parkin, Harry (1978). Batak Fruit of Hindu Thought. Christian Literature Society.
- Situngkir, Hokky (2024). A Lunar-Star Calendar: Inquiry to the Traditional Batak Cosmogram. Batakologi.
