= Karo people (Indonesia) =

Indonesian ethnic group

ᯂᯞᯂ᯳ᯂᯒᯭ
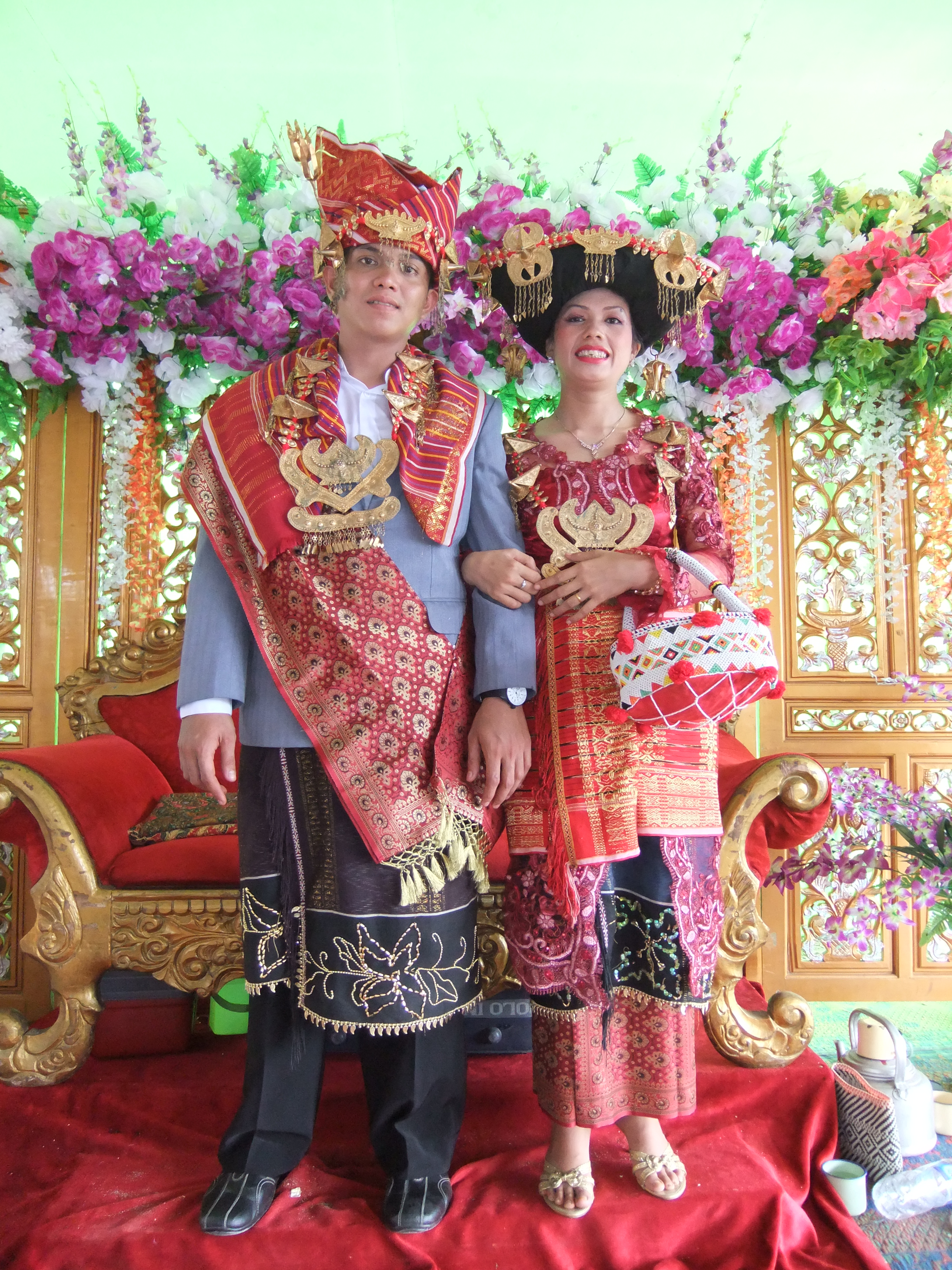
- A newly-married Karonese couple dressed in Karo traditional outfit (2010), the wedding ceremony called as Erdemu Bayu in local Karonese language.

Total population
- 1,232,655 (2013)

Regions with significant populations
- Indonesia (North Sumatra and Aceh)

Languages
- Karo language, Indonesian

Religion
- Predominantly Christianity (Protestantism & Roman Catholicism); Sunni Islam; Buddhism; Pemena

Related ethnic groups
- Alas; Kluet; Pakpak people; Simalungun people; Toba people; Malay

The Karo (also known as Karo Batak) people are one of the sub-ethnic groups of the Batak people, found mainly in Tanah Karo (the Karo lands) of North Sumatra, Indonesia. The Karo lands consist of Karo Regency, plus neighboring areas in Southeast Aceh Regency, Langkat Regency, Dairi Regency, Simalungun Regency, and Deli Serdang Regency. In addition, the cities of Binjai and Medan, both bordered by Deli Serdang Regency, contain significant Karo populations, particularly in the Padang Bulan area of Medan. The town of Sibolangit, Deli Serdang Regency in the foothills of the road from Medan to Berastagi is also a significant Karo town.

Karoland contains two major volcanoes, Mount Sinabung, which erupted after 400 years of dormancy on 27 August 2010 and Mount Sibayak. Karoland consists of the cooler highlands and the upper and lower lowlands.

The Karolands were conquered by the Dutch in 1904. In 1906, roads to the highlands were constructed, ending the isolation of the highland Karo people. The road linked Medan and the lowlands to Kabanjahe and from there to both Kutacane in Aceh and Pematangsiantar in Simalungun. The first Christian evangelism was conducted among the Karo people in 1890 by the Netherlands Missionary Society. Due to the perceived association with the colonialism of the Dutch East Indies, only a minority of the Karo converted initially and it was not until after Indonesian independence in 1945 that Christianity acquired significant support among the Karo people.

In 1911, an agricultural project began at Berastagi, now the major town in Karoland, to grow European vegetables in the cooler temperatures. Berastagi is a prosperous part of Karoland near Medan, while towns further in the interior have lower incomes and limited access to healthcare.

The administrative centre of Karo Regency is Kabanjahe.

== Karo identity ==
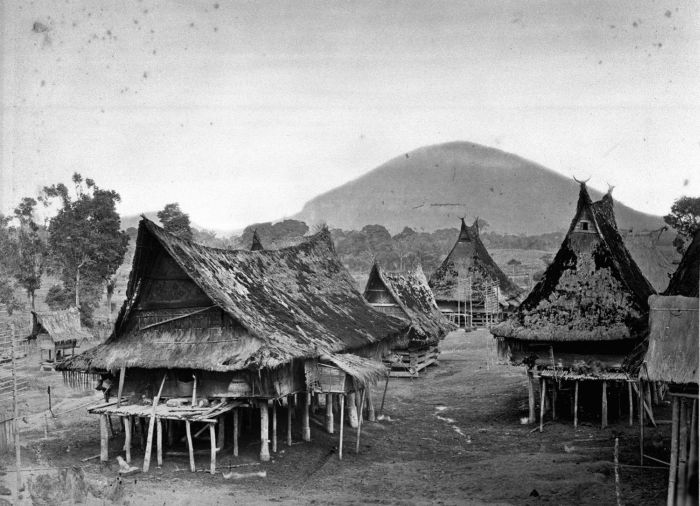
Traditional longhouses at a Karo village near Lake Toba, circa 1870.

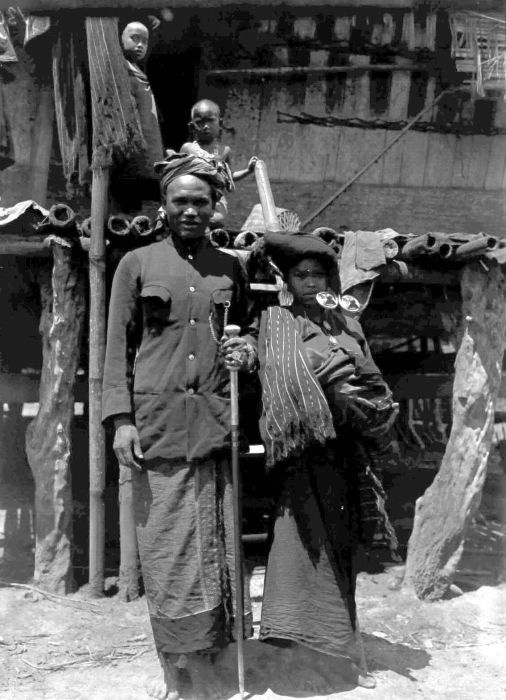
A Karonese woman wears a shawl (Gatip Ampar) over her shoulders and earrings (Padung Perak), while the man is likely wearing a Julu Berjongkit or Ragi Santik as a hip covering. The photo was taken in one of the villages in Karo Regency, around 1914-1919

A flag once used by the Karo people, acquired by Wereldmuseum Amsterdam in 1959

The Karo people speak the Karo language, a Northern Batak language, but not mutually intelligible with Southern Batak languages, in addition to Indonesian. These Karo people are divided up into clans or merga. The Karo merga are Karo-Karo, Ginting, Sembiring, Perangin-Angin, and Tarigan; these merga are then divided up into sub-clans and finally families.

In the 1200s–1500s, the Karo people established the Aru Kingdom (also spelled Haru), located in modern-day Medan City and Deli Serdang Regency. It was one of the earliest kingdoms in Sumatra. The population of the Aru Kingdom adhered to native animism, Hinduism, and Islam. Islam slowly gained influence in coastal areas since the late 13th century. Despite being among the earliest Sumatran kingdoms that were exposed to Islam, the people of the Aru kingdom remained predominantly pagan, especially those who inhabited the interior regions. The successor state of the Aru Kingdom was the Sultanate of Deli, which demonstrated a mixed influence of Karo, Malay, Tamil, and Aceh.

Today, most of the Karo people are Christian, a religion brought to Sumatra in the 19th century by missionaries. However, an increasing number of people living away from the Karo Highlands have converted to Islam, with the influence of Muslim Malay from the neighboring Deli area in Medan and Javanese immigrants, thus reducing the prevalence of the customs of pig farming and cooking. Some Muslims and Christians, however, still retain their traditional animist beliefs in ghosts, spirits (perbegu), and traditional jungle medicine, despite the fact that it contradicts their other beliefs. The Gereja Batak Karo Protestan or Karo Batak Protestant Church is the largest church among the largely Christian Karo people of North Sumatra, Indonesia. This tribal congregation was established formally in 1941 as a Reformed-Calvinist church. The church has 276,000 members (as of 2006) in 398 congregations with 196 pastors. It is a member of the World Communion of Reformed Churches.

The Karo people traditionally lived in shared longhouses also called "rumah Siwaluh Jabu", but very few now remain (one in Desa Lingga, Karo district), and new construction is exclusively of modern designs.

The ancestors of the Karo are believed to have migrated from Taiwan (Formosa), the urheimat of the Austronesian peoples, thousands of years ago, but it is believed that some of the Karo people may have intermarried with the visiting Tamils following Rajendra Chola's Invasion of Sumatra. This intercourse influenced their religious beliefs, as well as ethnic makeup. The marga Sembiring, meaning 'black one', and many Sembiring sub-marga (Colia, Berahmana, Pandia, Meliala, Depari, Muham, Pelawi, and Tekan) are clearly of South-Indian origin, suggesting that inter-marriage between Karo and Tamil people took place.

The inclusion of Karo people with other Batak subgroups, is controversial due to cultural and linguistic differences. This has led into rejection of the "Batak" label by some Karonese, and the creation of Karo Bukan Batak (KBB, lit. 'the Karonese are not Bataks') movement.

== Religion ==
Religion of Karo people in Indonesia
1. Protestantism (57.5%)
2. Sunni Islam (21.3%)
3. Roman Catholic (18.7%)
4. Buddhism (1.40%)
5. Pemena (1.10%)

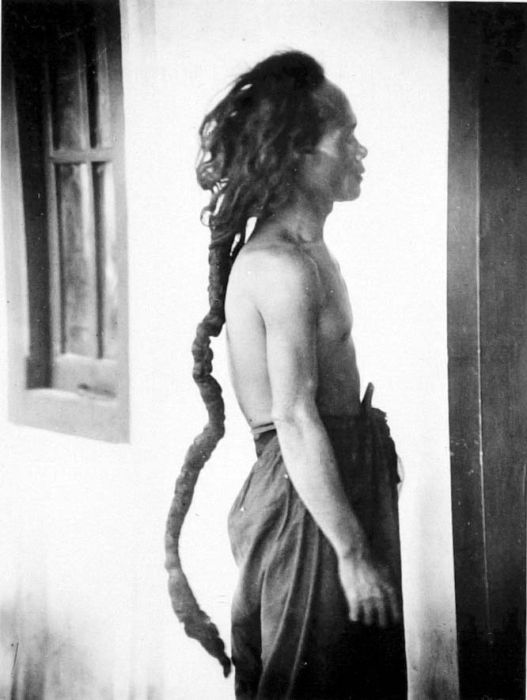
Traditional Karo priest.

=== Traditional beliefs ===
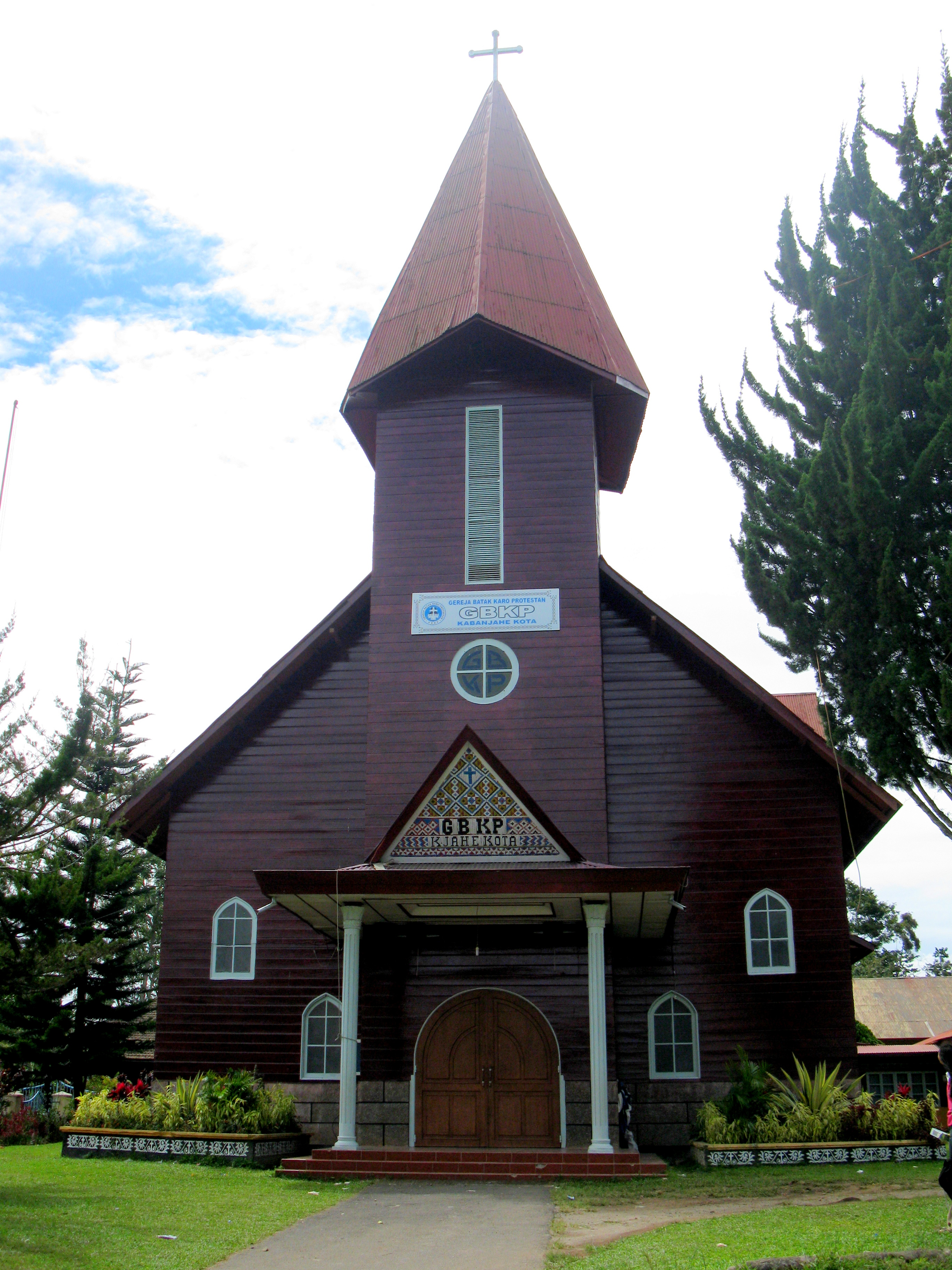
A Karo people church affiliated with Karo Batak Protestant Church (GBKP). Kabanjahe, Karo Regency, North Sumatra.

=== Christianity ===
The Karo were harassing Dutch interests in East Sumatra, and Jacob Theodoor Cremer, a Dutch administrator, regarded evangelism as a means to suppress this activity. The Netherlands Missionary Society answered the call, commencing activities in the Karolands in 1890, where they engaged not only in evangelism but also in ethnology and documenting the Karo culture. The missionaries attempted to construct a base in Kabanjahe in the Karo highlands but were repelled by the suspicious locals.

In retaliation, the Dutch administration waged a war to conquer the Karolands, as part of their final consolidation of power in the Indies. The Karo perceived Christianity as the 'Dutch religion', and its followers as 'dark-skinned Dutch'. In this context, the Karo church was initially unsuccessful, and by 1950 the church had only 5,000 members. In the years following Indonesian independence the perception of Christianity among the Karo as an emblem of colonialism faded, with the church itself acquiring independence, and adopting more elements of traditional Karo culture such as music (whereas previously the brass band was promoted). By 1965, the Karo church had grown to 35,000 members.

=== After the Indonesian mass killings of 1965–66 ===
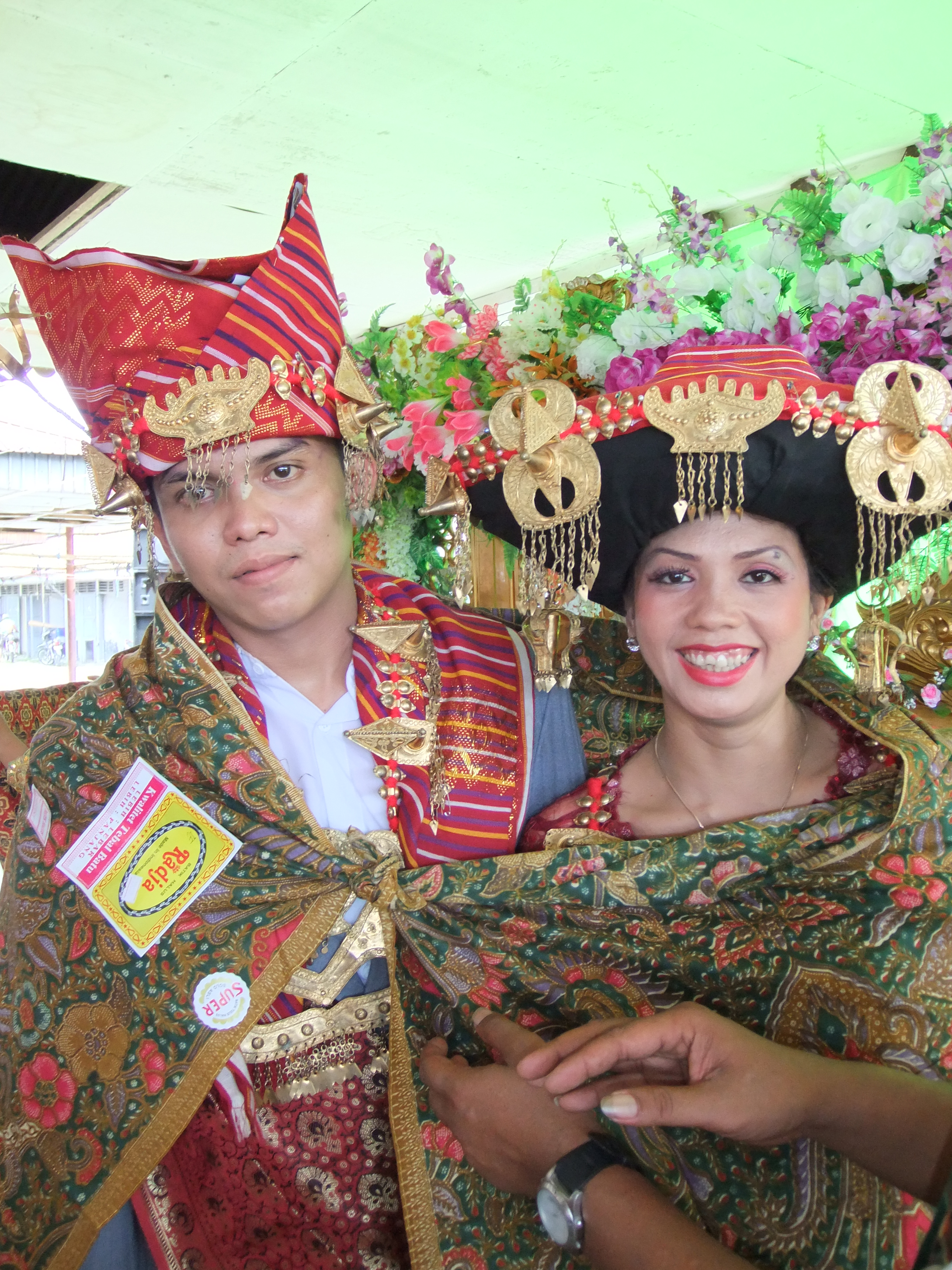
Karo married couple being bound in a sling (traditionally used in Indonesia for carrying babies), wearing traditional costumes including ulos (Karonese: uis) this action signifies this couple is now united as husband and wife.

The Karo continued to follow their traditional religion for several decades after the arrival of the first Christian missionaries in the Karolands.

Following the Indonesian killings of 1965–1966, at which time over 70% of the Karo still followed traditional religions, there was a push for Indonesians to identify with an established religion. Many Karo joined the GBKP (Batak Karo Protestant church) (60,000 were baptised in 1966–1970.), and from 5,000 Muslims (mostly non-Karo) in Karoland in 1950, there were 30,000 in 1970.

At this time, the Balai Pustaka Adat Merga Si Lima (BPAMSL) was established in Berastagi. BPAMSL proclaimed the 'agama Pemena', or the religion (agama) of the founders (Pemena).

The concept of 'religion' was relatively new in the Karoland; historically the neighbouring Muslim people, were known as 'kalak Jawi' or the people of the Jawi lands, and the concept of 'kalak Kristen', or Christian people, was the first time that people were identified by their religion rather than their land. The 'agama Pemena' of BPAMSL was a defense against accusations of atheism, Communism or animism.

BPAMSL conducted a ceremony in the Lau Debuk–Debuk hot spring akin to the one to invest in a new Karo village. This ceremony essentially validated the Dutch-established Berastagi as a 'true' Karo village and was attended by the regent of Karo regency and other political figures.

At that time, BPAMSL became the largest religious organisation in the Karolands, surpassing the GBKP, and absorbing many who had joined it following the anti-Communist purge.

As a response to the Pemena movement, the GBKP after 1969 determined that members could participate in village rituals as a matter of adat (tradition), whereas previously they had been rejected by GBKP as of a religious (unchristian) nature.

After Golkar won the elections in 1972, Djamin Ginting, a leading BPAMSL figure proclaimed BPAMSL as a movement within Golkar, adopting Islam as his religion, while Indonesian National Party supporters rejected this. With BPAMSL no longer a united force for the practice of Pemena, and Pemena itself no longer a uniting force in the Karoland, and with all Indonesians required to follow one of the religions of Islam, Protestantism, Catholicism, Hinduism, Buddhism, or risk writing 'without belief' on their identity card, the board members of BPAMSL met with a wealthy Indian man from Medan and determined that the traditional religion was, in fact, an expression of Indian Hinduism and that it had been founded by a 'Bagavan Bṛgu', from which had been derived the alternate name for the Karo beliefs 'Perbegu' (followers of 'begu' (in Karo, begu is a spirit or ghost)), the existence of Indian-originating Karo marga names and similarities between Karo ritual and Indian Hindu ones all proving this. Thus the Association of Karo Hinduism (PAHK) was proclaimed.

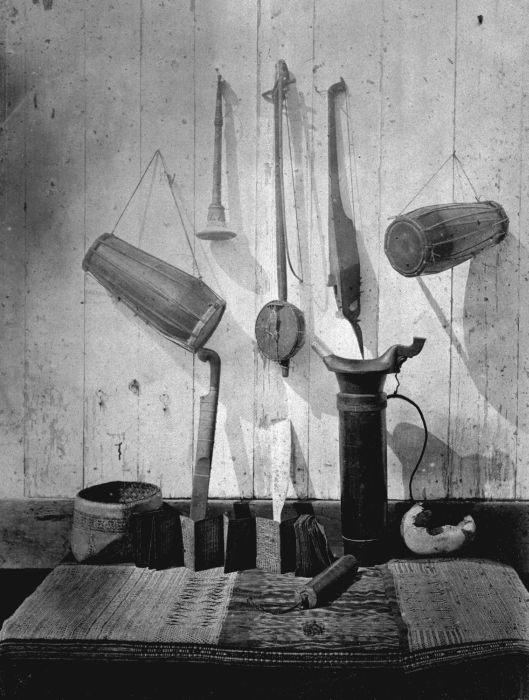
Musical instruments and other items identified as Karo Batak, photograph (circa 1870) by Kristen Feilberg.

The PAHK declared 'Pemena is the same as Hinduism' and received funding from Medan Indians for their cause. PAHK became a movement within Parisada Hindu Dharma Indonesia, and as a culmination of this, in 1985 PAHK became a branch of the PHDI, PHDK. When Parisada Hindu Dharma Karo (PHDK) was established, it claimed 50,000 members and 50,000 more sympathisers. The PHD built a Balinese-style temple in Tanjung, a Karo village to inaugurate the PHDK. In doing so it was stated that PHDI (i.e. Balinese) Hinduism was the only valid form, and the Karo 'Hindu' ritual was invalid, the name change from 'Hindu Karo' to 'Hindu Dharma Karo' and the replacement of Tamil Indians on the PAHK board with Balinese on the PHDK symbolising the assertion of 'Hindu Dharma' as the 'valid' Hindu religion, with little regard paid to re-imagining Karo rituals within an Agama Hindu context.

There was an immediate decline in PAHK/PHDK support, with a small number of people still following the PHDK practices, but others following traditional Karo (Pemena) rituals outside of the formal context of PHDK. This left the Christian GBKP, by then for many years an indigenous Karo-run adat-respecting church a rather more comfortable option for most Karo than the Balinese Hinduism asserted by PHDK. There are today four Balinese-style PHDK temples in the Karoland, but the concept of Karo traditional beliefs as a manifestation of Hinduism is otherwise largely extinct.

=== Modern Christianity ===
Although the Gereja Batak Karo Protestan (GBKP) is the largest Karo church, There are also Catholic (33,000 members as of 1986) and several Pentecostal denominations.

== Merga Silima ==
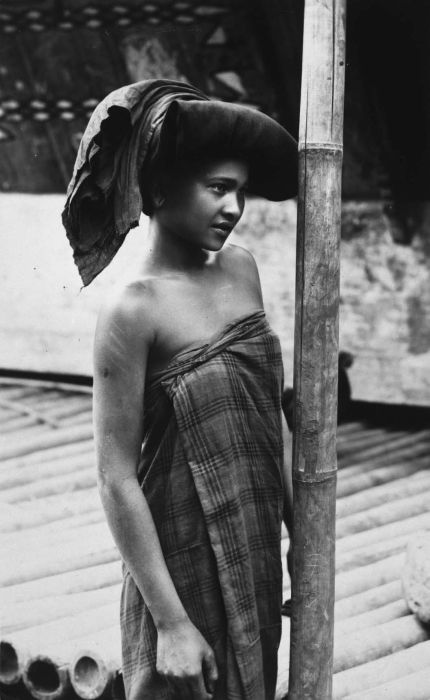
A Karo woman in traditional attire.

Karo people belong to one of five merga or clans, which are Ginting, Karo-Karo, Perangin-Angin, Sembiring, and Tarigan. Each marga is further divided into sub-marga (83 in total). Except for marga Karo-Karo, most Karo identify themselves by their principal rather than sub-merga.

Karo and other's Batak adat prohibits marriage within a marga (e.g., Ginting with Ginting). Upon marriage, the bride becomes a part of the groom's family, with the kalimbubu (bride's family) joining with anakberu (groom's family).

Karonese marriages are very large affairs, with typically 200 attendees, comprising the family members of both marrying parties. The ritual is called Mbaba belo selambar. It includes the chewing of betel nut (sirih), traditional Karonese dancing (which focuses on hand movements), the payment of a nominal dowry to each of the kalimbubu. Food is cooked by the anakberu, who spends hours cooking to cater to the guests. This social obligation is expected to be reciprocated so that Karo people can attend several weddings each month. Non-Karo people do not attend the wedding ceremony. Where a non-Karo person wishes to marry a Karonese, they would be adopted into a Karo marga.

Traditionally kalimbubu-anakberu relationships would be reinforced by cross-cousin marriages (i.e. to one's mother's brother's child), however, in modern Karo society, this tradition is no longer important.

=== Merga origin mythology ===
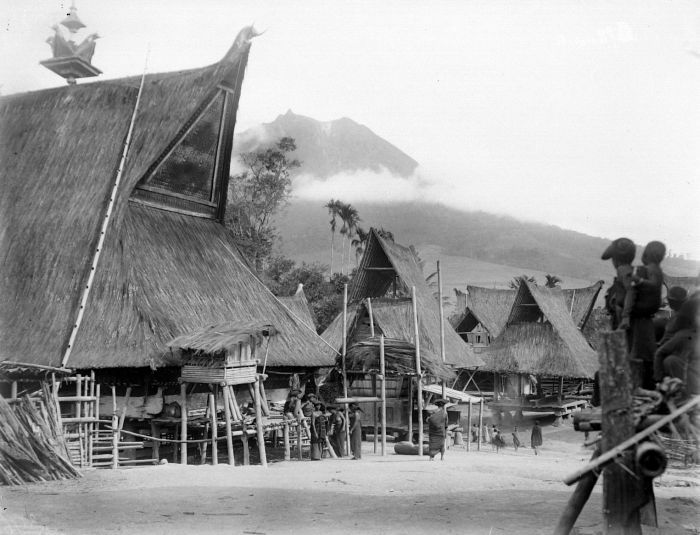
Karo traditional house, 1914.

Karo tradition states that the Merga Silima originate from five villages, each established by a Sibayak, a founding community. The Sibayak Suka whose family name was Ginting Suka established Suka village. The Sibayak Lingga called Karo-karo Sinulingga established Lingga village. The Sibayak Barusjahe whose family name was Karo-karo Barus pioneered Barusjahe village. The Sibayak Sarinembah, called Sembiring Meliala established Sarinembah village. The Sibayak Kutabuluh named Perangin-angin established Kutabuluh village.

Each one of these five villages has its satellite villages inhabited by the extended families of the main village inhabitants. The satellite villages were established for the convenience of the villagers whose fields were relatively far from the main villages. The purpose was to save them time when travelling back and forth from the village to their fields. Today, these satellite villages have developed and matured to be independent of the main villages. In the past, these satellite villages used to ask for help from the main villages to deal with natural disasters, tribal disputes, diseases, and famine.

The leaders of these satellite villages were called urungs. The Sibayak Lingga administered five villages i.e., Lingga, Tiganderket, Tiga Pancur, Naman, and Batukarang. The Sibayak Suka administered four villages i.e., Suka, Seberaya, Ajinembah, and Tengging. The Sibayak Sarinembah administered four villages i.e., Sarinembah, Perbesi, Juhar, and Kutabangun. The Sibayak Barusjahe administered two villages i.e., Barusjahe and Sukanalu. The Sibayak of Kutabuluh administered two villages i.e., Kutabuluh and Mardingding.

== Cuisine ==
=== Foods ===
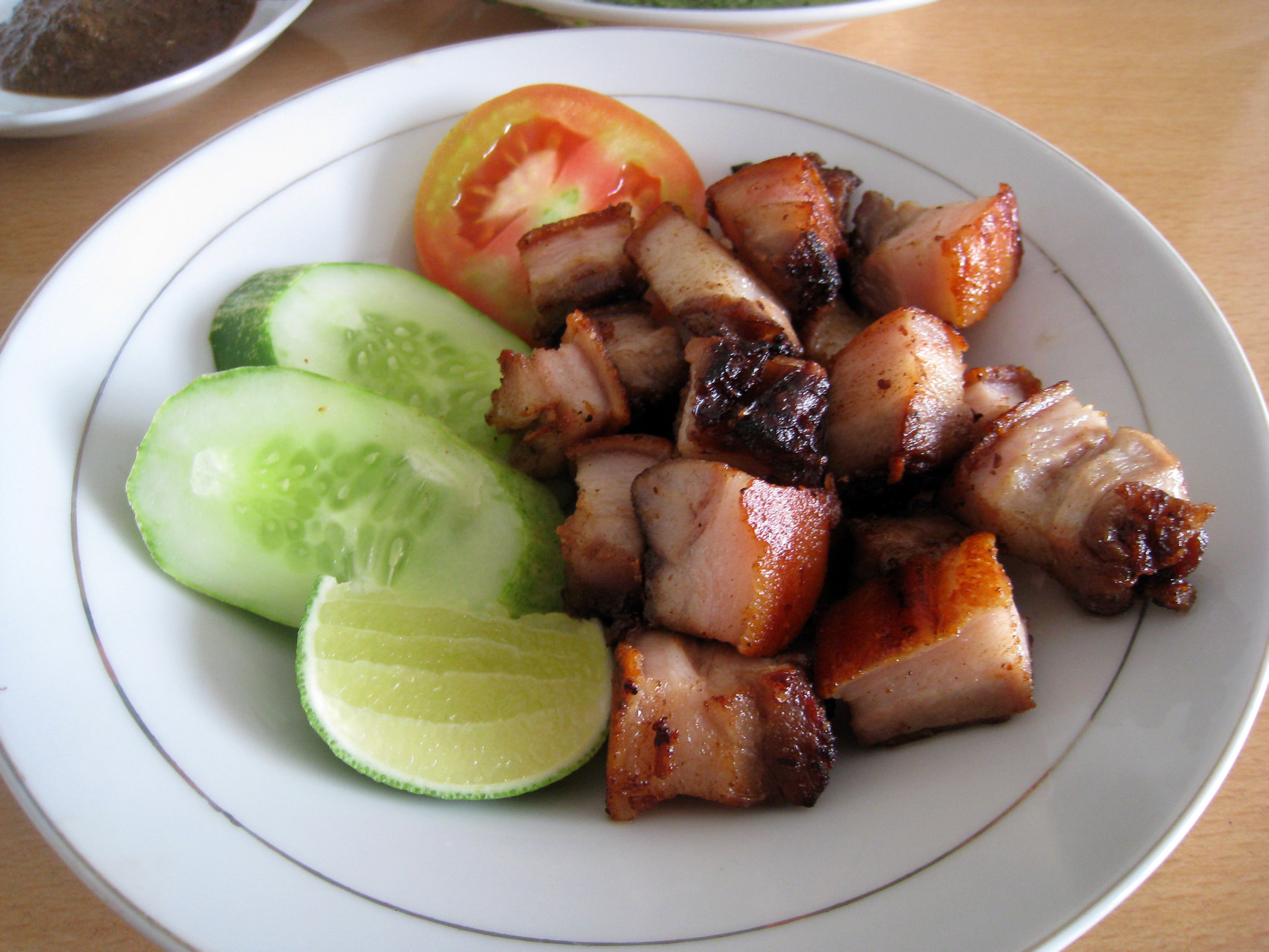
Babi Panggang Karo (BPK)

- Babi Panggang Karo (BPK) (grilled pork with pig blood sauce)
- Gulai ikan (a fish curry)
- Rendang cekala (meat rendang cooked with cekala)
- Lemang-lemang (glutinous rice, coconut milk, and salt, cooked in a hollowed bamboo tube coated with banana leaves to prevent the rice from sticking to the bamboo.)
- Lomok-lomok (traditional spicy or savoury dish made with pork or dog).
- Arsik/tangas-tangas (a traditional goldfish/carp dish)
- Pagit-pagit atau Terites (traditional Karo soup made from partially digested grass from a cow, mixed with other ingredients, herbs and spices)
- Cimpa (various Karo cakes made of rice flour, coconut and palm sugar. Traditionally consumed during the Kerja Tahun [Yearly Party] festival)
- Tasak telu (a traditional Karo chicken dish which is cooked three times using different ingredients and cooking methods each time).
- Rires (more commonly known as "Lemang", a traditional food made of glutinous rice and coconut milk)
- Cimpa Bohan (various Karo cakes made of purple sweet potato, coconut and palm sugar. Traditionally consumed during the Kerja Tahun [Yearly Party] festival)
- Cipera (a type of Karo soup made with Corn, chicken and other spices and left to stew in water)

=== Drinks ===
- Bandrek (a traditional ginger tea with other spices)

== Notes ==
=== Bibliography ===
- Aritonang, Jan S.; Steenbrink, Karel A., eds. (2008). A History of Christianity in Indonesia. Studies in Christian Mission 35. Leiden: Brill. ISBN 978-90-041-7026-1.
