= Jamaluddin Pohan =

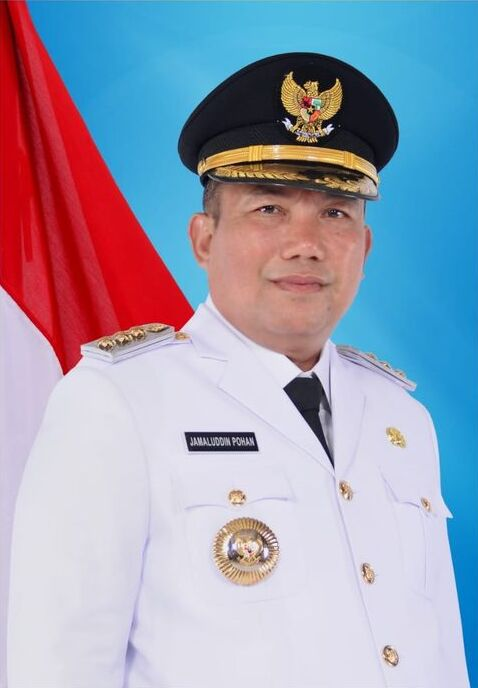

Mayor of Sibolga
- In office 26 February 2021 – 20 February 2025
- Preceded by: Syarfi Hutauruk
- Succeeded by: Akhmad Syukri Nazri Penarik

Personal details
- Born: 4 February 1966 (age 59) Barus, North Sumatra, Indonesia
- Political party: Golkar (before 2021; 2024–present); Nasdem (2021–2024)

Jamaluddin Pohan (born 4 February 1966) is an Indonesian politician of the Golkar party. He served as the mayor of Sibolga, North Sumatra from 2021 to 2025. He was previously active in Central Tapanuli Regency's politics, serving as its vice-regent from 2000 to 2004 and as a member of its local legislature from 2004 to 2014.

== Biography ==
Jamaluddin Pohan was born on 4 February 1966 in Barus, in Central Tapanuli Regency of North Sumatra. He is one of ten children of Abdul Syukur Pohan, and in 2019 Jamaluddin founded a Quran school in his hometown in honor of his father. He is married to Farida Hanum Siregar, and they reside in Pandan, Central Tapanuli including during Pohan's time as mayor of Sibolga.

Between 2000 and 2004, he served as the vice-regent of Central Tapanuli, and was politically involved in Golkar. He was a member of Central Tapanuli's Regional House of Representatives (DPRD), serving as its deputy speaker for two terms between 2004 and 2014. Starting in 2015, his Golkar affiliation moved to Sibolga city and he also joined the Pancasila Youth organization there. He resigned from Golkar in February 2020, and in that year he ran for mayor of Sibolga in the mayoral election. He was backed by Golkar, Nasdem, Gerindra, Demokrat, Perindo, and PKS. Pohan, with Demokrat politician and Sibolga local legislator Pantas Maruba as his running mate, proceeded to win the election with 27,494 votes (53.05%). They were sworn in on 26 February 2021.

During his term, Sibolga's municipal government received an award from the central government for being the first municipality in North Sumatra to have a complete land registration. A new fish market was also constructed and was opened in July 2024. He did not register to run for reelection in the 2024 mayoral election, and he was replaced by Akhmad Syukri Nazri Penarik on 20 February 2025. Throughout his term as mayor, he initially had joined the Nasdem Party, becoming its Sibolga branch's chairman, but he moved back to Golkar in 2024.
