= Tapanuli =

Tapanuli (or, in obsolete Dutch spelling, Tapanoeli) may refer to:

- Central Tapanuli Regency, North Sumatra, Indonesia
- North Tapanuli Regency, North Sumatra, Indonesia
- South Tapanuli Regency, North Sumatra, Indonesia
- Tapanuli orangutan, a species of orangutan
- Tapanoeli Residency, a colonial Dutch administrative division consisting of most of the western coast of modern North Sumatra province.
- Sibolga Bay, formerly called in Dutch Baai van Tapanoeli, North Sumatra
- SS Tapanoeli, a Dutch steam merchant ship from Rotterdam that was active from 1924, primarily in connection to Batavia, Dutch East Indies, which was sunk by German U-boats on 17 March 1941
- Tapanuli fever, a fictional illness from the Sherlock Holmes story The Adventure of the Dying Detective
