= Tamil Indonesians =

Tamil Indonesians இந்தோனேசியத் தமிழர்
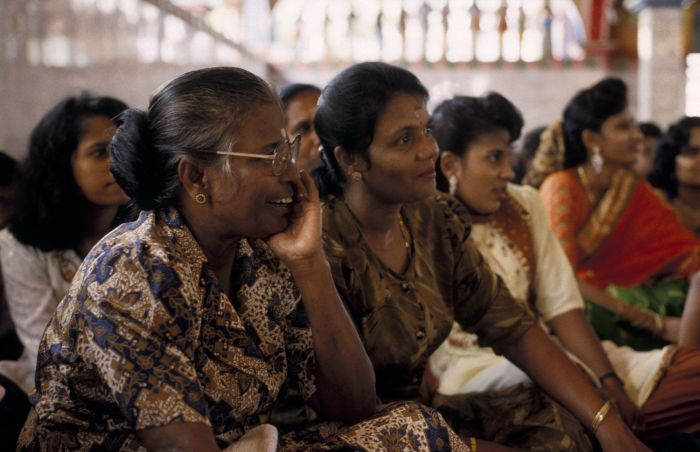
- Tamil devotees in Mariamman Temple, Medan.

Total population
- 75,000 (1996)

Regions with significant populations
- North Sumatra, Jakarta, Aceh, Riau, Riau Islands, and Bali

Languages
- Indonesian; Tamil

Religion
- Predominantly; Hinduism; Minorities; Christianity · Islam · Buddhism

Related ethnic groups
- Indian Indonesians; Tamil Malaysians

Tamil Indonesians are persons from Indian Tamil ancestry living in Indonesia. The majority of them live in Medan in North Sumatra while there are small community in other parts of the country such as Jakarta, Aceh, Riau, Riau Islands, and Bali. It is estimated that there are around 25,000 PIOs/NRIs living in Indonesia of which the Indian expatriate community registered with the Embassy and Consulate in Medan numbers around 30,000.

== History ==
=== Pre-colonial era ===
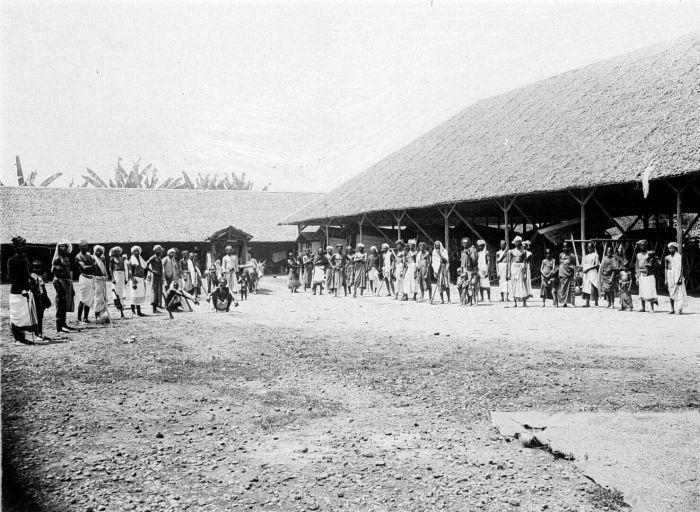
A group of Tamil workers were brought from India by the Dutch for working on plantation sectors in Medan, 1920s.

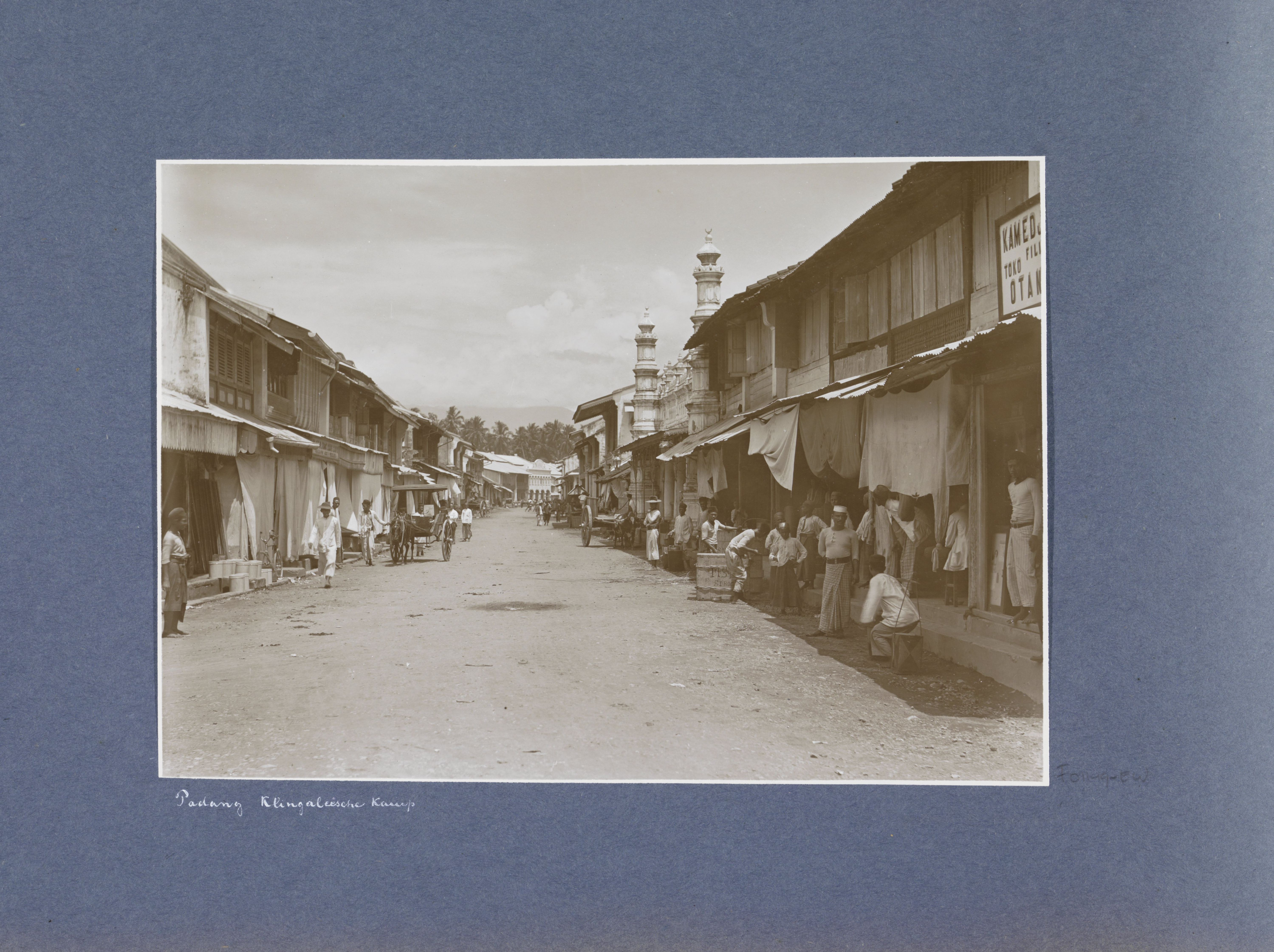
Indian settlement in Padang, the settlers mainly are Tamil descent, circa 1900s

Tamils have a long history in Indonesia. After Rajendra Chola I's attack on Srivijaya Empire in 1024–1025, there was a noticeable increase in Tamil economic activity in Southeast Asia, including Indonesia. One of direct consequence of Chola invasion was the emergence of Kota Cina, an ancient trading town currently located in northern Medan.

Their presence has been recorded in Lobu Tua Inscription dating from 1088 about Five Hundred Lords of Ayyanuruwar, a Tamil merchant guild in Barus, an ancient port town currently located in Central Tapanuli Regency, North Sumatra. The inscription itself is written in Tamil, and Barus was called Varocu by them. The Tamils residing permanently or temporarily in Barus were mainly traders or craftsmen by profession. Some of them were migrated to Karoland and Kota Cina, and assimilated with local Karo people. The clan (merga) Sembiring is believed to have a connection with the Tamils. Many of its sub-mergas, like Colia (chola), Berahmana (brahmin), Pandia (pandyan), Meliala (malayalam), Depari (devanagari), Muham (mugam), Pelawi (pallava) and Tekan (tenkasi), are clearly of South Indian origin. Some scholars cited that some aspects of Karo tradition are believed to have been influenced from Tamil culture, such as disposing of the dead and urung (village federation, thought to be influenced from medieval Tamil society).

Another evidence of Tamil presence is the Suruaso Inscription, dating from the 14th century. The inscription was found in Tanah Datar Regency (West Sumatra), and written in two languages, Old Malay and Tamil. The Tamils were also assimilated with Acehnese people, and many of them have physical resemblance to that of Tamils. However, they do not practice Tamil culture or speak Tamil language anymore.

=== Dutch colonial period ===
Tamils from India were brought to Indonesia by the Dutch in the early build-up of the plantation industry in the 1830s. Agents visited villages in South India and tempted poor uneducated Tamils to come to "Tanah Deli" (Sumatra) and were promised easy work with good pay.

After they arrived in Indonesia, they were used for hard labor and housed in simple huts. Most of them worked for the Dutch company, Deli Maatschappij under harsh conditions. A small number of Tamils returned to India after their contract expires. At the end of the 1940s, many Tamils got an opportunity to return and left, but about 5,000 to 10,000 Tamils remained in North Sumatra, mainly in Medan, but also in Lubuk Pakam (Deli Serdang Regency), Tebing Tinggi, and Binjai.

=== World War II and Independence ===
After World War II and the country's independence from the Dutch, many Tamils left the plantations and they often used cow carts as transport. These vehicles became their tools for making a living. Some even bought abandoned Japanese military vehicles, which they used to transport sand and building material for building projects. Other Tamils have specialized in spice trading at the markets and a few become contractors and government officials.

Many Tamil Indonesians have remained in North Sumatra except for a few hundred families in Jakarta and the Tamils who went to Sigli in Pidie Regency, Aceh in an early stage.

== Relations with other groups ==
Tamil Indonesians always had a harmonious relationship with other ethnic groups in North Sumatra, as the cultural and economic background do not differ too much. As for interracial marriages, not until the last two generations did Tamil Indonesians began to intermarry with other ethnic groups.

== Organizations ==
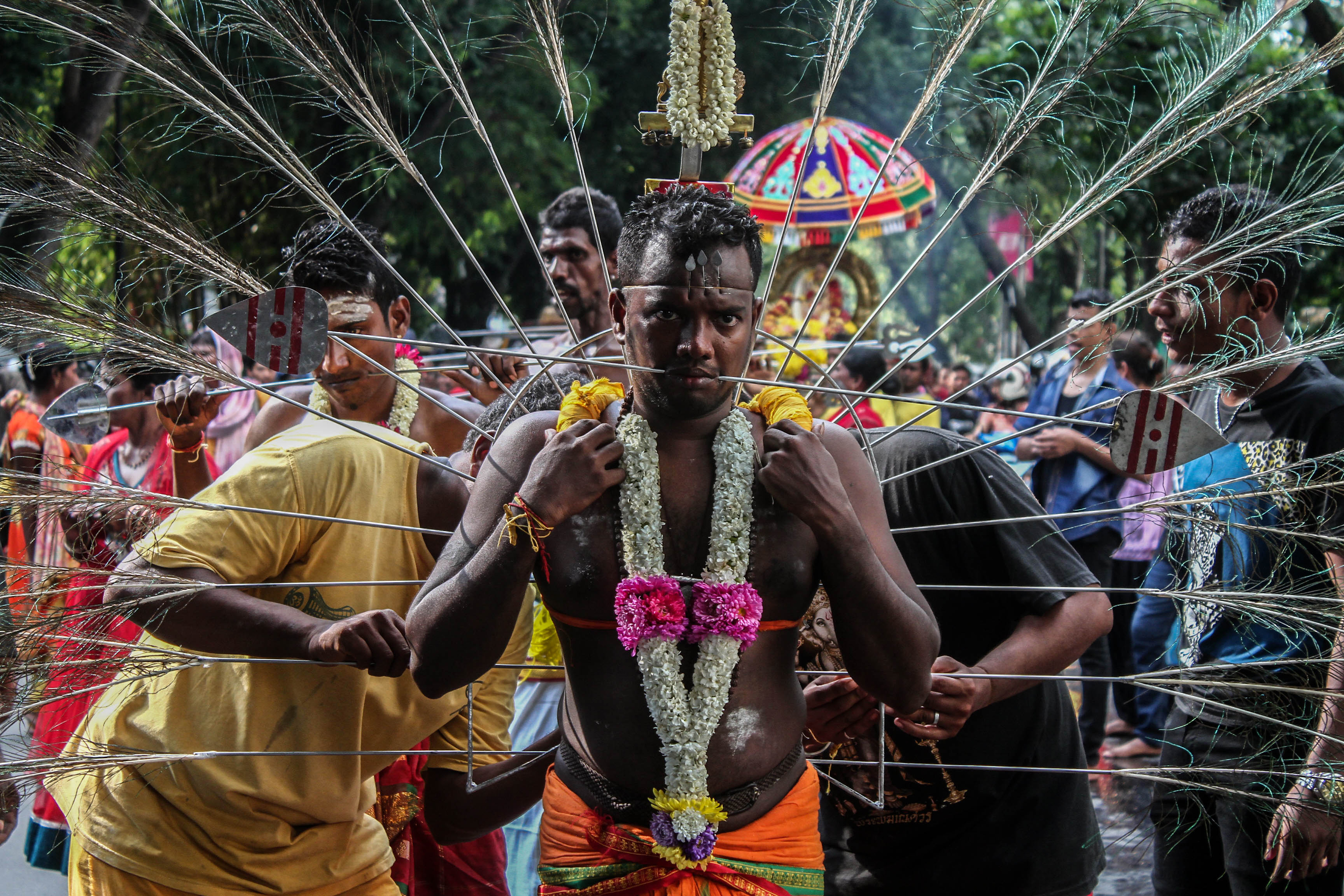
Thaipusam celebration in Medan, North Sumatera, Indonesia, 2016. The devotee piercing the skin, tongue or cheeks with Vel as symbol of honoring to the Tamil God of Murugan

In August 2011, more than 400 Tamil Indonesians gathered in Jakarta to form a new association, the Indonesia Tamil Sangam (ITS). The ITS is a nonprofit, social and cultural organization dedicated to the welfare of the Tamil-speaking community living in Indonesia and it will organize Tamil language classes and establish a Tamil library in Jakarta.

Other than Indonesian Tamil Sangam, there are some religious-based Tamil organizations, such as:

- Perhimpunan Kuil Shri Mariamman (Shri Mariamman Temple Association).
- Adi-Dravida Sabah.
- Muda-mudi Buddha Tamil (Tamil Buddhist Youths).
- South Indian Moslem Foundation and Welfare Committee.
- Atma Jyothi - Indonesia Hindu-Tamil Association.
- Love Medan Indians, Social Concern, Medan Tamil Less-fortunate kids, teens and youths education and careers.
- Holy Trinity Church, Medan Christian Ministry amongst and to the Tamils and Indians.
- Annai Velangkanni Shrine, Tamil Catholic Spiritual Pilgrimage.

== Population ==
It is not known for exactly how many Tamils in Indonesia are, as post-1930 censuses do not include ethnical category. According to A. Mani (1980), there were 18,000 Tamils in North Sumatra in 1930. It is estimated that there were 75,000 Tamils in 1996 with religion percentage are 78% Hindus, 11% Buddhists, 5.5% Muslims and 4.5% Christians.

== Notable Tamil Indonesians ==
- Charles Tambu - Indonesian Politician.
- D. Kumaraswamy - Hindu reformer and Tamil community leader in Indonesia.
- Kimmy Jayanti - Indonesian actress and model.
