= Syarfi Hutauruk =

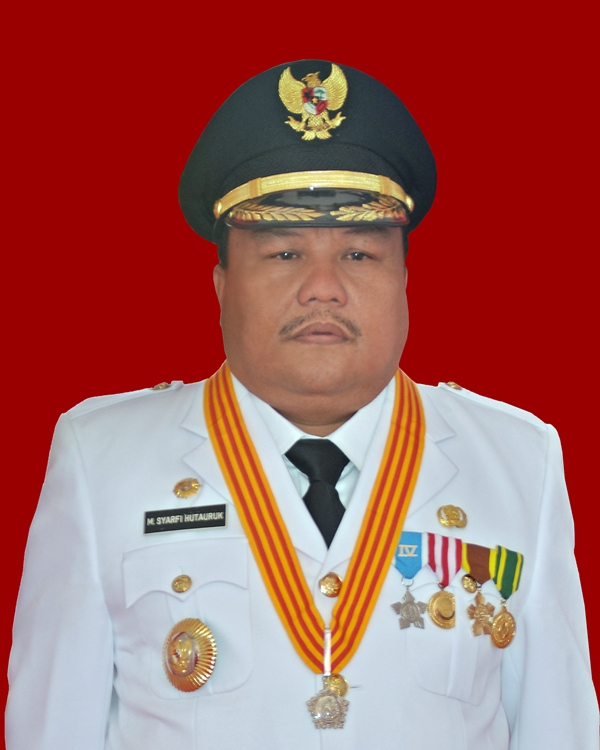
- Hutauruk as mayor of Sibolga

Member of the House of Representatives
- In office 1 October 1997 – 1 October 2009

Mayor of Sibolga
- In office 17 February 2016 – 17 February 2021
- In office 26 August 2010 – 26 August 2015
- Preceded by: Sahat Pinorsinta Panggabean
- Succeeded by: Jamaluddin Pohan

Personal details
- Born: 9 July 1959 (age 66) Central Tapanuli, North Sumatra, Indonesia

Syarfi Hutauruk (born 9 July 1959) is an Indonesian politician. He was a member of the House of Representatives from 1997 to 2009, and mayor of Sibolga, North Sumatra for two terms in 2010–2015 and 2016–2021.

== Early life ==
Syarfi Hutauruk was born on 9 July 1959 in Sorkam, within Central Tapanuli Regency. His parents were farmers. After completing elementary school at his home village, he continued his studies at Islamic schools in Padang. He obtained a bachelor's degree in 1986 from Padang's Imam Bonjol Islamic Institute, and later in 2000 he would obtain a master's in human resource management from Indonesia Open University.

== Career ==
After completing his studies at Imam Bonjol, Hutauruk began to work as a marketing manager while also being a reporter for the magazine Kartini. He also for a time worked as a civil servant at the Ministry of Information.

Following the 1997 Indonesian legislative election, Hutauruk became a member of the House of Representatives (DPR) as a Golkar member representing North Sumatra. He would retain his DPR seat as a Golkar member following the 1999 (representing Central Tapanuli) and 2004 elections (from North Sumatra's 2nd district), and between 1999 and 2003 he was head of Golkar's parliamentary faction. He was part of DPR's Fourth Commission during his 2004–2009 term.

In 2010, Hutauruk ran in Sibolga's mayoral election with Marudut Situmorang as running mate, winning 20,493 votes (46.3%) and defeating four other candidates. His competitor Afifi Lubis launched a lawsuit over the election results to the Constitutional Court of Indonesia, which upheld the results. Hutauruk and Situmorang were sworn in on 26 August 2010. Hutauruk would be reelected in 2015 with Edipolo Sitanggang as his new deputy and 24,774 votes (55.1%), and Hutauruk was sworn in for his second term on 17 February 2016.

As mayor, Hutauruk pushed for the development of infrastructure for fishing and fish processing industries. During the COVID-19 pandemic late in his second term, Sibolga's municipal government provided stimulus funding for hospitality and restaurant industries and gave tax waivers.

After his tenure in Sibolga ended, Hutauruk was elected chairman of the Islamic Education Movement (Persatuan Tarbiyah Islamiyah/PERTI) for the 2022–2027 term. He also ran again for a seat in DPR, in his old district of North Sumatra II as a Demokrat candidate, but was not elected.

== Personal life ==
He is married to Delmeria Sikumbang, and the couple has three sons. Delmeria served one term (2019–2024) in DPR representing North Sumatra's 2nd district as a Nasdem Party member. In 2019, Hutauruk published an autobiography, the release date coinciding with his 60th birthday.
