= Tapanuli Residency =

Administrative subdivision of the Dutch East Indies

Tapanoeli Residency Residentie Tapanuli
- Residency of Dutch East Indies
- 1844–1942
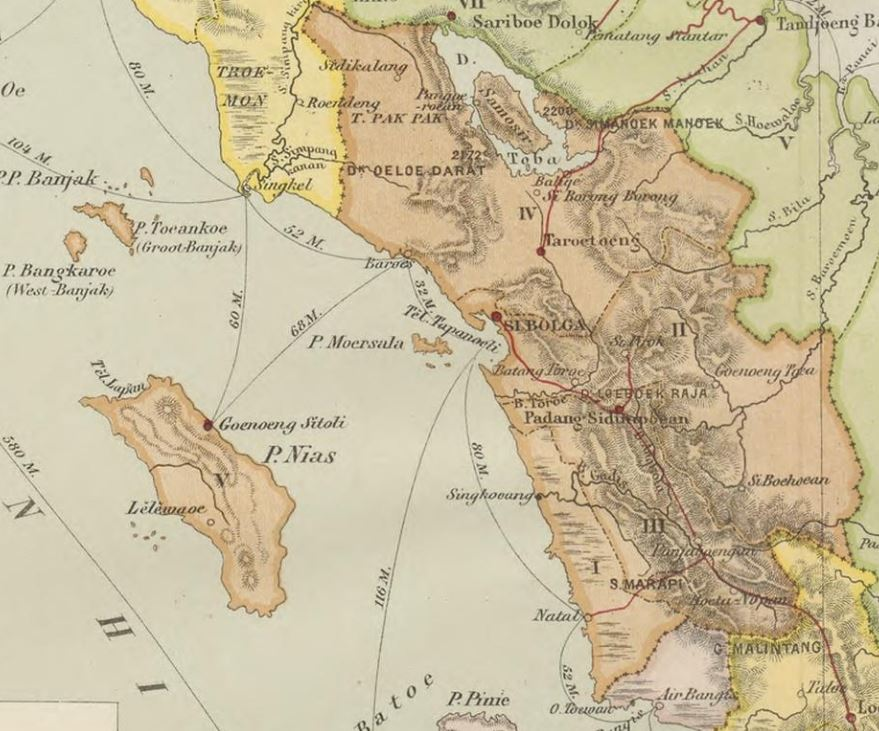
- Malay-language map of Tapanoeli Residency (1909)
- Capital: Sibolga
- History
  - Established: 1844
  - Disestablished: 1942
- Today part of: Tapanuli

Tapanuli Residency (Dutch: Residentie Tapanoeli) was an administrative subdivision of the Dutch East Indies with its capital in Sibolga. It was located in northern Sumatra and existed in various forms from 1844 until the end of Dutch rule in 1942. The area it encompassed at various times corresponds to most of the western coast of the current day Indonesian province of North Sumatra and parts of Aceh, including much of the traditional heartland of Batak people (called in their language Tano Batak). Lake Toba, a historically important crater lake, was also within the borders of the Residency.

== History ==
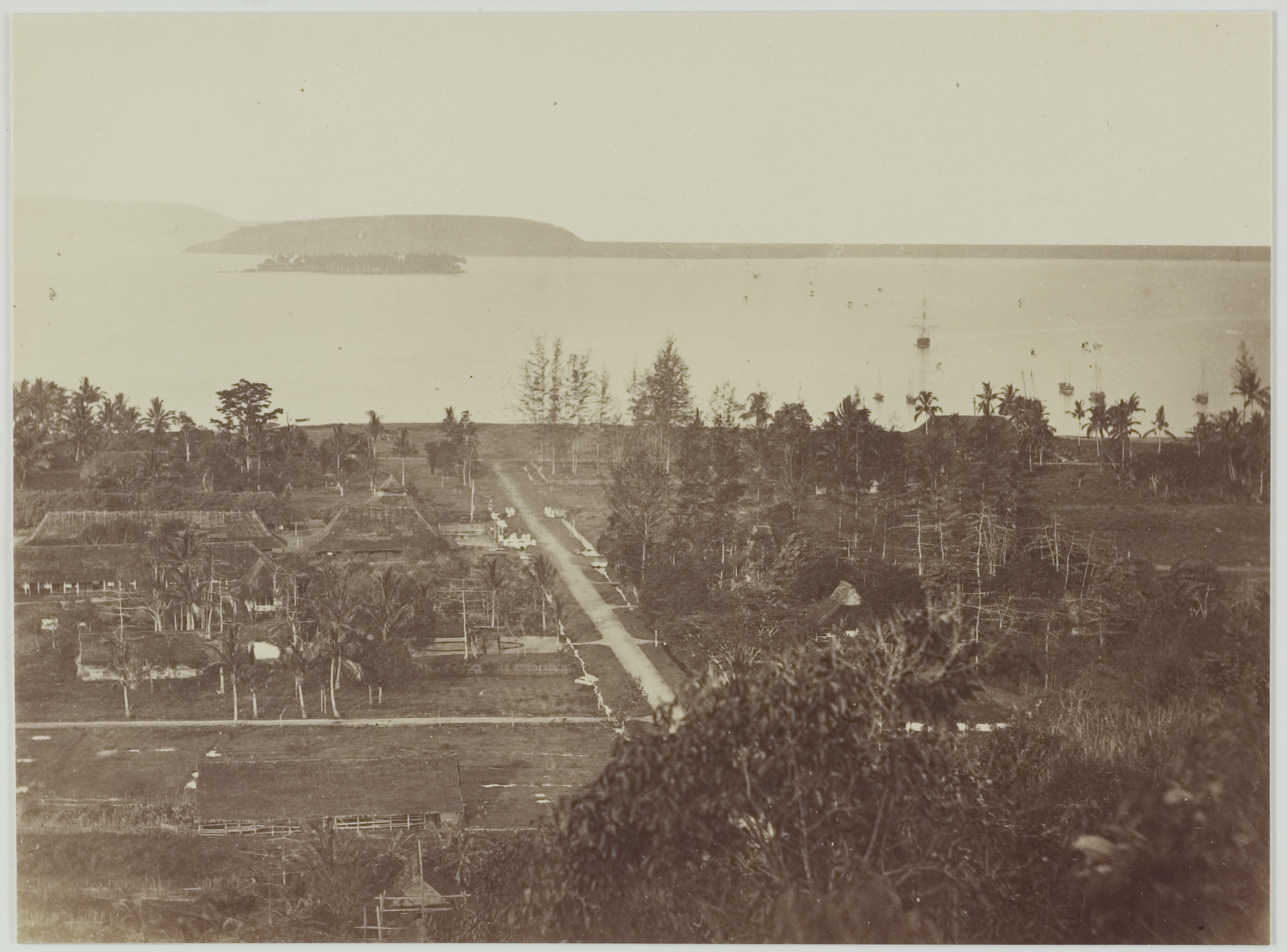
View of Tapanoeli at Sibolga Bay, 1860s

The land that became Tapanoeli Residency had been previously essentially independent. The Dutch East India Company as well as the British started to establish posts along the Western coast of Sumatra during that time; the British even established a fort at Tapanuli in 1752. The Dutch expanded into Sumatra more aggressively into the 1820s and 1830s; the region that became Tapanoeli Residency had little contact with Westerners before that time, except in some coastal areas. They initially established Tapanoeli as part of Ajer Bangis Residency before separating it into its residency under the Gouvernment Sumatra's Westkust in 1844. The Residency was named after a village near Sibolga Bay; its name derived from the Batak languages meaning essentially a pleasant seaside village. Despite the fact that they had established the Residency on paper, the Dutch had little presence or influence in the interior of the region until the 1860s.

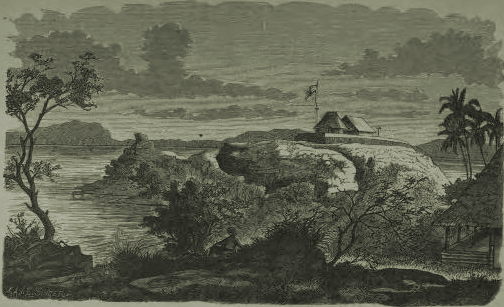
Fort Tapanoeli, early 19th century

It remained sparsely populated in the 1850s, due to the mountainous terrain; one estimate put the population in 1852 at roughly 75,000 "Sumatrans" (including Malays and Bataks), under 70 Europeans, roughly 250 Chinese and 350 Javanese, but more than 7,000 slaves. That estimate may be too low, as another puts the 1840 population of Tapanoeli Residency at around 350,000 in total. Its economy at that time was based mainly on the small-scale extraction of resources using traditional methods, including frankincense, resin, camphor, gambier, coconut oil, rattan, gold ore, as well as the farming of cattle, goats, and so on. Coffee cultivation was introduced to the Bataks on government initiative in the 1840s, and it gradually became a centre of cultivation and export. The Dutch also allowed German missionaries to set up missions in the Residency.

As plantation industries were developed in Sumatra in the late nineteenth century, the demographics of Tapanoeli changed as Javanese and Chinese workers were imported as labour. The borders of the Residency were revised several times in the early twentieth century; in 1902 and 1904 Trumon and Singkil were transferred to Atjeh and Dependencies Residency, and in 1908 a number of formerly independent Batak districts were added to Tapanoeli, including Samosir. At around the same time those adjustments were made, the first complete European map of Tapanoeli was released as well. It gained the status of a full Residency in 1906, reporting directly to Batavia; Sumatra's West Coast, which it had formerly reported to, was demoted to the status of a residency. There was not much large-scale economic development on behalf of the Dutch until after 1908, when the area was opened up to European exploitation; after that, a number of rubber, coffee, and other plantations were built.

As a densely forested, mountainous area Tapanoeli struggled regularly with Malaria outbreaks in the early twentieth century.

After 1918, the Residency was subdivided into 4 subdivisions:

- Sibolga en Omstreken, including the capital Sibolga and surrounding regions;
- Nias en omliggend eiland, including Nias Island
- Bataklanden, including Tarutung, Samosir and much of the Toba Batak territory.
- Padang Sidempoean, centered on the city Padangsidempuan

In 1938, Tapanoeli and all other residencies on the island of Sumatra were reorganized under a new regional Gouvernement of Sumatra, whose capital was in Medan. However, with the Japanese occupation of the Dutch East Indies starting in 1942, Tapanoeli Residency ceased to exist. During the Indonesian National Revolution, the region was very contested and fell under the rule of various warlords; it was only after April 1948 that the Republic of Indonesia started to assert its control and included the area of Tapanuli in the newly created province of North Sumatra.

== List of Residents of Tapanoeli ==
No.	Portrait	Name	Took office	Left office	Note
-		L.A. Gallé	1843	1844	as Assistant Resident
1		A. van der Hart	1844	1848	first Resident
2		P.H.A.B. van Hengst	1848	1850	
3		W. Kocken	1850	1851	
4		P.T. Couperus	1851	1853	
5		F.H.J. Netscher	1853	1855	
6		J. Blok	1855	1858	
7		J. van der Linden	1858	1860	
8		C.H. Palm	1860	1862	
9		H.A. Steijn Parvé	1862	1864	
13		J.K de Wit	1864	1865	
11		C.C.L. van Coeverden	1865	1869	
12		H.D. Canne	1869	1874	
13		S. Stibbe	1874	1876	
14		J.C. Boyle	1876	1881	
15		D.F. van Braam Morris	1881	1882	
16		C.F.E. Praetorius	1882	1887	
17		A.W.P. Verkerk Pistorius	1887	1888	
18		A.L. van Hasselt	1888	1893	
19		P.J. Kooreman	1893	1894	
20		E.A. Taylor Weber	1894	1895	
21		W.C. Hoogkamer	1895	1898	
22		L.C. Welsink	1898	1908	
23		C.J. Westenberg	1908	1911	
24		J.P.J. Barth	1911	1915	
25		F.C. Vorstman	1915	1921	
26		W.K.H. Ypes	1921	1925	
27		P.C. Arends	1925	1926	
28		H.Ch. Gooszen	1926	1929	
29		U. Fagginger Auer	1929	1933	
30		J.W.Th. Heringa	1933	1936	
31		V.E. Korn	1936	1939	
32		J.N. van der Reyden	1939	1942	
