= Pannai =

Buddhist kingdom in Sumatra (11th-14th centuries)

Pannai Kingdom
- 11th century–14th century
- Capital: Pannai
- Religion: Vajrayana Buddhism
- Government: Monarchy
- History
  - Established: 11th century
  - Disestablished: 14th century
- Today part of: Indonesia

Pannai, Panai or Pane was a Buddhist kingdom located on the east coast of Northern Sumatra that existed between the 11th and 14th centuries. The kingdom was located on the Barumun River and Panai River valleys, in today's Labuhan Batu and South Tapanuli regencies. Because surviving inscriptions and historical records of this period are scarce, the kingdom is among the least known political entities in Indonesian history. Historians suggest that Pannai was probably a principality or a vassal allied under the Srivijayan mandala and later to Dharmasraya kingdom.

The historical records mentioning this kingdom derived from Indian and Javanese sources. The state of Pannai, with river runs through it, was mentioned in the Tanjore inscription dating from the 11th century, as one of the polity sacked by Rajendra Chola I of Chola dynasty during his campaign against the prosperous Srivijaya. Three centuries later, Prapanca confirmed Pannai as one of the Malay states targeted in Majapahit's foreign diplomacy.

Panai among ancient Melayu kingdoms realm.

Despite the lack of local historical records, on the upstream of these rivers however, 16 Buddhist Vajrayana temples were discovered. These temples are known today as the Padanglawas temple compounds, with one specifically known as the Bahal temple. Experts suggest that the existence of the temples is linked to the Kingdom of Pannai. The temples constitute tangible traces of Vajranaya Buddhism in Sumatra.

The state of Pannai, according to Thanjavur inscription found in India, fell after a surprise attack from the rear. Pannai did not suspect an attack from a Chola occupied Srivijaya, the mandala's capital.

Historian suggests, that it is likely that the past Padang Lawas area was more fertile than it is now. Therefore the Panai Kingdom was rich in forest products, especially camphor and livestock, and might also produce gold. Only the rich and prosperous society were able to build temples like Bahal temple complex. In Armenian-language travel records, Indian City Names and Persian Suburbs, Pane is referred to as the port where much high-quality camphor can be found. Camphor originated from two ports, namely Barus on the west coast of Sumatra, and P’anes or P’anis, namely Panai on the east coast.

== Historiography ==
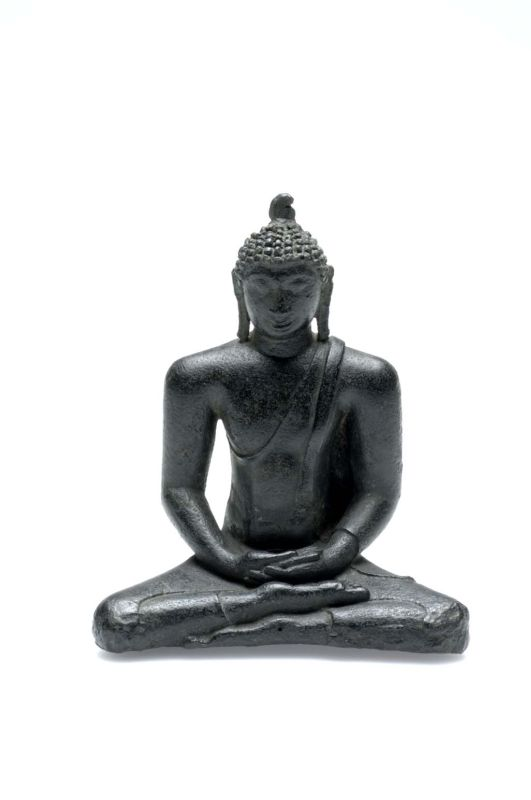
Buddha Amitabha bronze statue from Pamutung in Padang Lawas. One of a few artifact linked to Pannai Kingdom

The existence of this kingdom was first mentioned in Thanjavur inscription written in Tamil dated from 1025 and 1030. The inscription created by Rajendra Chola I, king of Cholamandala kingdom, Chola Dynasty, in South India, mentioned about Chola invasion of Srivijaya. This inscription mentioned Pannai with its water ponds was among the conquered cities during Rajendra Chola I campaign against Srivijaya.

Other than Pannai, the Chola invasion also claimed Malaiyur, Ilongasogam, Madamalingam, Ilamuri-Desam, and Kadaram. The inclusion of Pannai together with other port cities being invaded during Chola campaign against Srivijaya suggested that Pannai was a member of the Srivijayan mandala.

The only local source mentioning the name Panai is the Panai inscription, discovered by the Biaro Bahal temple complex, in Padang Lawas regency, North Sumatra. The 10th line of the inscription contains the word Panai. There is also a mention of the word kuti in the inscription which probably refer to the Buddhist temple nearby, called as biaro by current local community. The title of haji accompanying the word kuti indicates that there is a small kingdom ruled by a haji or a lesser king, which was posthumously dedicated in the Bahal temple. In other words, historian conclude that Pannai was probably a small kingdom ruled by a king with honorific title Haji, which was the adherent of Buddhism. In ancient Indonesia, the title haji or aji refers to a regional ruler, a lesser king, a vassal, or a subordinate ruler in contrast to the paramount Maharaja (Chakravartin). To date, Panai inscription is the only remaining local primary historical source of the kingdom. Unfortunately much of the writings in this inscription is unreadable due to its poor condition.

Three centuries later, the name of the kingdom reappeared in Javanese source, the Nagarakretagama, written by Mpu Prapanca from Majapahit Empire dated 1365 (or 1287 Saka year). In Nagarakretagama canto 13, Pane is mentioned as one of Sumatran kingdoms held under Majapahit influence. Javanese overlordship upon Malay states in Sumatra was probably initiated through Singhasari's Pamalayu expedition that pull Malayu Dharmasraya into Singhasari mandala orbit. Therefore, all of Dharmasraya's vassal states were also recruited within Javanese Singhasari mandala. These states includes Palembang, Teba, Kandis, Kahwas, Minangkabau, Siak, Rokan, Kampar, Pane, Kampe, Haru, Mandailing, Tamiyang, Perlak, Padang Lawas, Samudra, Lamuri, Batan, Lampung and Barus, all were under Singhasari influence later inherited by its successor state, Majapahit.

== Historical sites ==
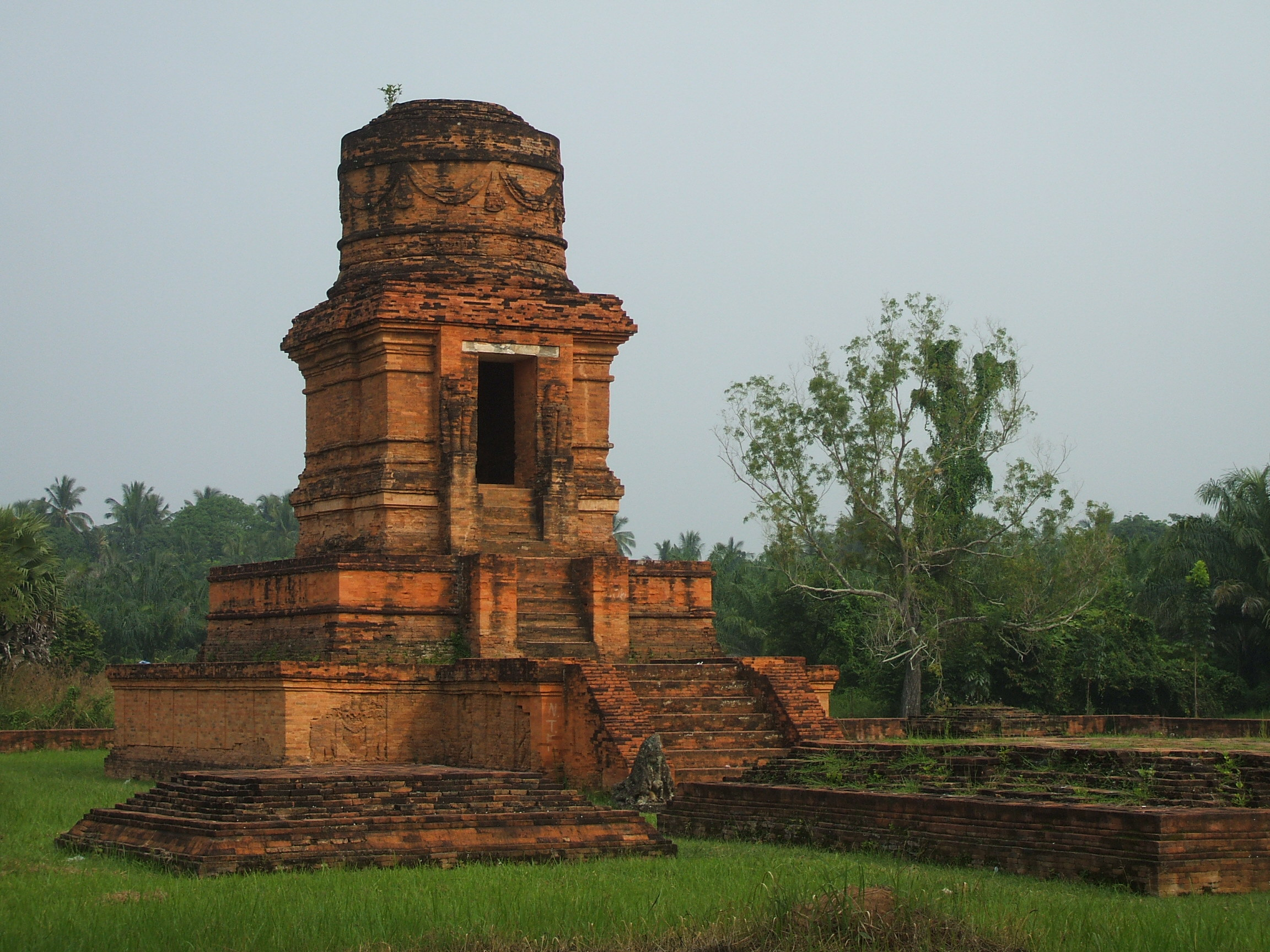
Bahal temple I, in Padang Lawas, North Sumatra. One of the remnants of Pannai Kingdom.

Historians and archaeology experts tried to locate the kingdom mentioned in these historical sources. The similar-sounding names directing them into the estuarine of Panai River and also nearby Barumun River on the east coast of today North Sumatra province, facing Malacca Strait. The toponymy Panai is still can be found toda in several areas in North Sumatra. In Labuhanbatu Regency there are Central Panai District, Panai Hulu District and Panai Hilir District. All three are located on the east coast of Sumatra, close to the Malacca Strait.

In 1846 Franz Junghuhn, a geology expert under Commission of Dutch East Indies authority reported the discovery of temple compound in Padanglawas area, upstream of Barumun River. This vast and empty savanna-like area dotted with Biaro, a local name for temple, obviously derived from Sanskrit vihara. These red brick structures — most of them are in ruins — was once the spiritual center of Pannai Kingdom. The most well-preserved temple within this Padanglawas temple compounds is Bahal temple.

Padanglawas area is a dry lowland basin with savanna-like climate. It is unlikely that this area was once support a dense habitation, and probably only used for religious purposes. Although this area is quite accessible by river or land routes, the dry climate of Padanglawas could not support agriculture villages. Therefore, it is suggested that the habitation area of the people that supported Padanglawas culture was located elsewhere. Probably near the estuarine of Barumun and Panai river and not located near these temples. It is suggested that the center of Pannai Kingdom was located in the more fertile area and much closer to maritime trade route of Malacca Strait, which pointing into the estuarine of Panai and Barumun river.

Despite its rich archaeological value, unlike the popular temples of Java, the Padanglawas temples are mostly neglected and in the state of ruins. There are some attempts to promote the temples as a tourism attraction, however because of its remote location and poor infrastructure, promotion and tourism activity is limited.

Other than the temple complex, some archaeological artifact has been discovered in the area. A bronze statue of Buddha Amitabha was found in the main temple of Pamutung, Padang Lawas. This bronze image demonstrate Sri Lankan style, it was presumably imported from Sri Lanka to Sumatra. This is one of a few artifacts linked to the Pannai Kingdom. This statue is now a collection of Tropenmuseum in the Netherlands.

== See also ==
- Melayu Kingdom
- Dharmasraya
- Aru Kingdom
- Buddhism in Indonesia
