= Lobu Tua Inscription =

Lobu Tua Inscription, also called Barus Inscription, is an inscription written in Tamil language which was discovered in 1873 in the village of Lobu Tua, Andam Dewi district of Central Tapanuli Regency, in North Sumatra Province, Indonesia. This inscription is dated 1010 Saka, or 1088 AD. This inscription was reported in the Madras Epigraphy Report of 1891-1892 by E. Hultzsch, an English epigraphist in India.

The inscription mentions the existence of a Tamil trade union in the Barus region. The trade union was named "The Five Hundreds of a Thousand Directions" (Disai-Ayirattu-Ainnurruvar). According to Prof. Y. Subbarayalu from Tamil University, Thanjavur, this trade union's other name was Ayyavole, which also left a Tamil-language inscription in Aceh. In Barus, they bought various commodities from the local population, and the members were collected excise in the form of gold, which was based on the price of the kasturi. The objects of the excise were the ship, the captain, and kevi.

According to reports, in the 1900s a Buddha statue in the form of a torso made of red granite was also found in the site, which is now gone. The existence of the statue in Barus raises the suspicion that the Tamil community there was permanent or semi-permanent, therefore it has its own place of worship.

Currently 7/8 parts of the inscription are stored in the National Museum of Indonesia and another one eight part is still in Lobu Tua. Beside inscriptions, in Lobu Tua some dry old cylindrical wells were found as well.

== Inscription text ==
The text of Lobu Tua Inscription is as follows:

1. svasti sri cakarai
2. antu ayirattu [p pa]
3. ttuc cellani [n]
4. ra macit tinkal
5. varocana matan
6. kari vallavat teci u
7. yyak konta pat
8. tinattu velapurattu
9. kuti niranta te [cit ticai]
10. vilanku ticai ayira
11. ttainnurruvaro
12. m nammakanar nakara senapa
13. ti nattucetti
14. yarkkum patinenbhumi
15. teci apparkku ma[ve]t
16. tukalukkum na vaittuk
17. kututta paricavatu mara[ka]
18. la... ... ...
19. la marakkala nayunun kevi
20. kalum kastu[ri] vilai mu[tala]kappa[ta]
21. ancu tun [ta]yam ponnum ku[tu]
22. ttup pavatai erakkatavatakavum
23. ippatikku [i]kkal eluti natti
24. k-kututtom patinenpumi tecit ticai vila
25. nkuticai ayirattainnurruvarom a
26. ramaraverka aramey tunai

1-4. Now, in 1010 Saka, the month of Masi

5-11. We, the Fifth Hundreds of a Thousand Directions, known in all countries and directions, have met in Valpuram in Varocu alias Matankari-vallava-teci-uyyakkonta-pattinam

12-17. Decided the following for "our son(s)" Nakara-senapati Nattucettiyar, Patinen-bhumi-teci-appar and mavettu:

18-22. [Each ... of] his ship, the skipper, and kevi will pay the ancu-tunt-ayam tax in the form of gold based on the price of the kasturi and [later] will walk on a stretch of cloth.

23-26. So, we the Five Hundreds of a Thousand Directions, known in all directions and in all eighteen countries have ordered to carve and stick this stone. Do not forget the kind attitude: the kind attitude itself is a good friend.

== See also ==
- Five Hundred Lords of Ayyavolu
- Tamil inscriptions in the Malay world
- Tamil Indonesians
