= Mursala Island =

Island in North Sumatra, Indonesia

Coordinates: 01°38′11.76″N 98°30′38.52″E

Native name: Pulau Mursala
- Interactive map of Mursala Island

Geography
- Location: Central Tapanuli Regency, North Sumatra, Indonesia
- Adjacent to: Indian Ocean
- Area: 80 km^{2} (31 sq mi)

Administration
- Indonesia
- Province: North Sumatra

Mursala Island (id:Pulau Mursala), also known as Musala Island or Mursalah Island, is an island off the coast of Sumatra. It is administrated by as part of Indonesia's Central Tapanuli Regency in the province of North Sumatra.

== Description ==
Mursala island is located off the south coast of Sumatra in the Indian Ocean. The island is noted for its natural beauty, though illegal forestry operations have negatively impacted the island's biological diversity. The closest major population center is Sibolga.

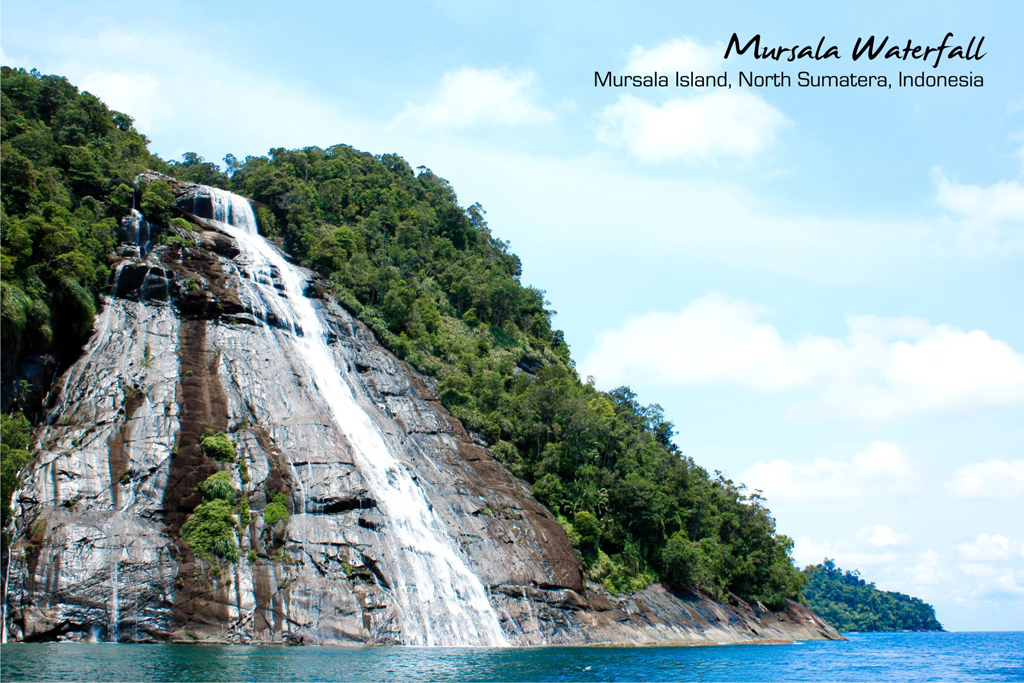
Prominent waterfall on Mursala

The island is known for a large waterfall on its western side. A smaller islet on Mursala's eastern side, Pantai Pulau Putri, is known for its beaches. Mursala island is one of the only known habitats for Dipterocarpus cinereus, a species of plant considered to be extinct until the 2010s.

According to some sources, parts of Peter Jackson's 2005 film King Kong were filmed on the island.
