= Akhmad Syukri Nazri Penarik =

Indonesian politician

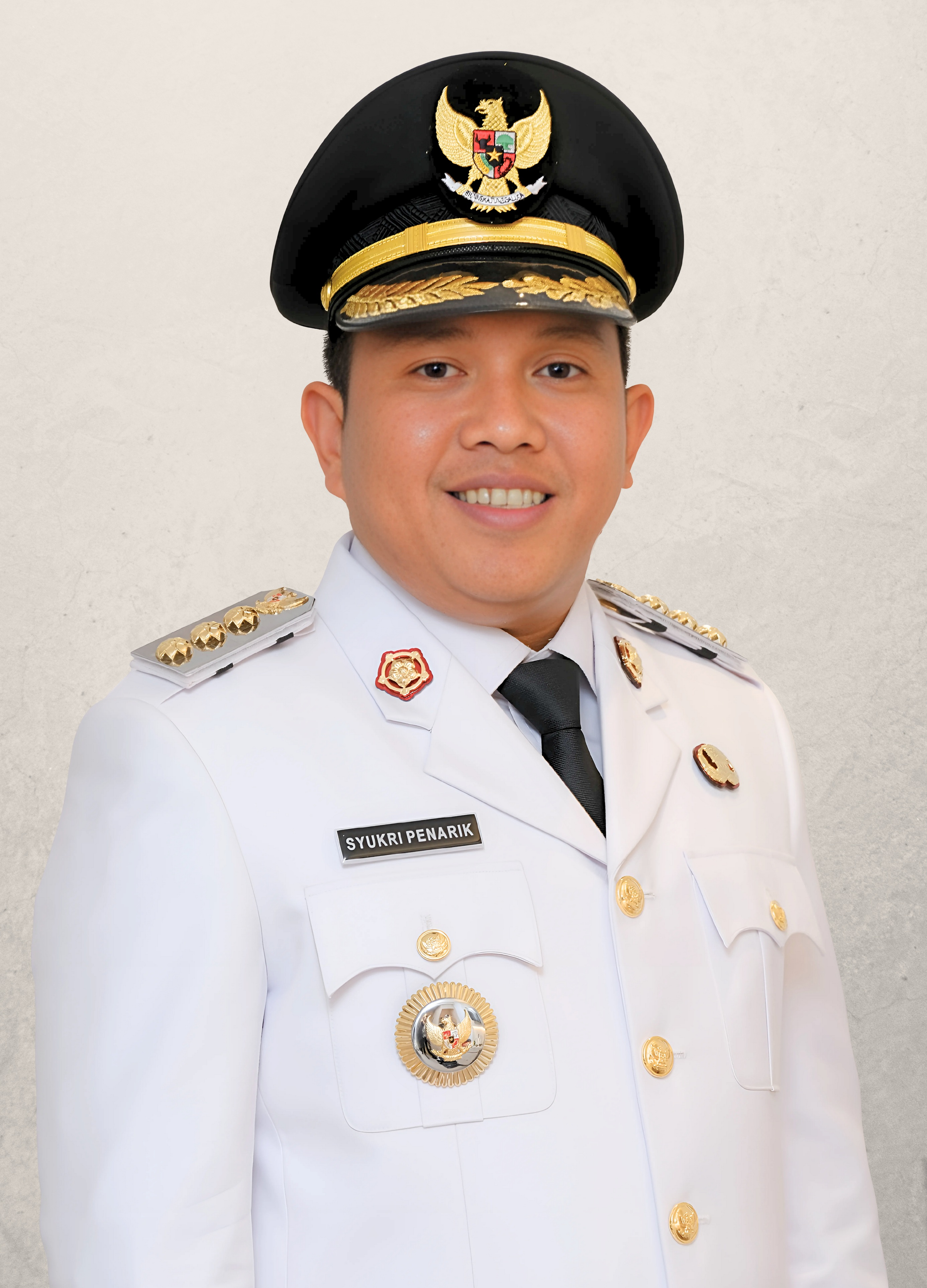
- 2025 portrait

Mayor of Sibolga
- Incumbent
- Assumed office 20 February 2025
- Preceded by: Jamaluddin Pohan

Speaker of Sibolga DPRD
- In office 28 October 2019 – 2024
- Preceded by: Tonny A. Lumbantobing
- Succeeded by: Ansyar A. Paranginangin

Personal details
- Born: 1 October 1990 (age 35) Sibolga, North Sumatra, Indonesia
- Party: Nasdem Party

Akhmad Syukri Nazri Penarik (born 4 February 1966) is an Indonesian politician of the Nasdem Party who has served as the mayor of Sibolga, North Sumatra since February 2025. He was previously a member of and speaker of the city's legislature from 2019 to 2024.

== Early life ==
Akhmad Syukri Nazri Penarik was born on 1 October 1990 in Sibolga. His father left his family during his childhood, and he was raised by his mother. After completing elementary school in Sibolga, Penarik studied at an Islamic middle and high school in Central Tapanuli, before receiving his bachelor's from North Sumatra Muhammadiyah University.

== Career ==
After graduating from university, Penarik would take part in politics. In 2017, he joined the winning campaign of Bakhtiar Ahmad Sibarani for the regency election for Central Tapanuli as part of its media team. After Sibarani was sworn in, he appointed Penarik as his adjutant. He would work under Sibarani until late 2018, when Sibarani convinced him to run for a seat in Sibolga's Regional House of Representatives (DPRD) in the 2019 Indonesian legislative election. Penarik won a seat as a Nasdem Party member, and he would become speaker of the DPRD on 28 October 2019. In 2023, Penarik would become chairman of Nasdem in Sibolga.

=== Mayor of Sibolga ===
Penarik was reelected for a second term in Sibolga DPRD in 2024, winning 2,521 votes (the most of all elected candidates). However, he resigned from his seat in order to run in Sibolga's mayoral election later that year. He ran with Pantas Maruba Lumbantobing as running mate, and the ticket received backing from Nasdem, Perindo, Gelora, Demokrat, PKS, and PBB. They won the four-way race, securing 26,551 votes (52.5%). They were sworn in on 20 February 2025. As mayor, Penarik announced the removal of fines for vehicle tax payments in 2025 in order to encourage an increase in municipal revenues.

On 25 November 2025, when Sibolga was affected by Cyclone Senyar, Penarik was out of town and was trapped between landslides blocking the road between Sibolga and Tarutung. He was uncontactable for four days, and during the period he returned to Sibolga on foot travelling 50 kilometers. Landslides induced by the cyclone killed over 50 people in Sibolga alone. In response to logistical issues and shortages in the aftermath, Penarik issued a circular to Sibolga's businesses prohibiting hoarding and price gouging.

== Personal life ==
He is married to Rahma Saena Nasution.
