= Sahat Pinorsinta Panggabean =

Indonesian politician

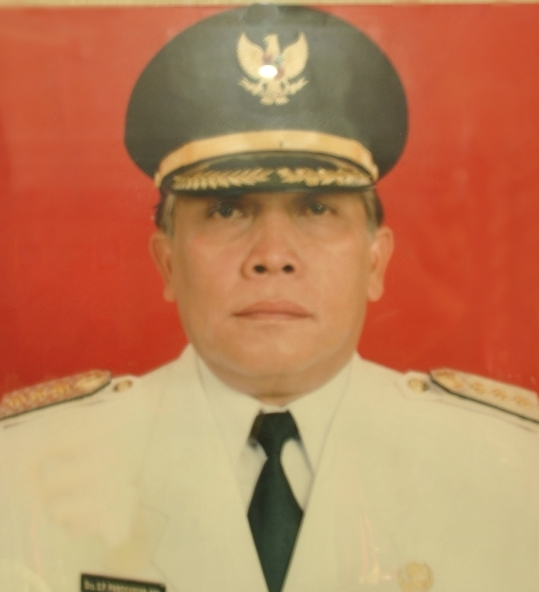

Mayor of Sibolga
- In office 2000–2010
- Preceded by: Zainuddin Siregar
- Succeeded by: Syarfi Hutauruk

Personal details
- Born: 5 November 1950 Sibolga, North Sumatra, Indonesia
- Died: 29 October 2018 (aged 67) Sibolga, North Sumatra, Indonesia
- Party: Golkar

Sahat Pinorsinta Panggabean (5 November 1950 – 29 October 2018) was an Indonesian politician and civil servant who served as the mayor of Sibolga, North Sumatra for two terms between 2000 and 2010. Prior to becoming mayor, he was a civil servant in North Tapanuli Regency.

== Biography ==
Sahat Pinorsinta Panggabean was born on 5 November 1950 at the village of Sibolga Julu, today part of Sibolga city. His father was T. Panggabean, a civil servant, and his mother was N. Br. Hutapea. Panggabean was a graduate of Medan's Home Affairs Governance Academy (Akademi Pemerintahan Dalam Negeri/APDN).

After graduating from APDN, Panggabean worked as a civil servant in North Tapanuli Regency. During his time there, he served as head of the districts of Lintong Nihuta, Sipoholon, and Tarutung, before he was appointed president director of North Tapanuli's municipal water company in 1995. He worked there until 2000. He was then elected mayor of Sibolga in 2000, and served two terms in this position. During his tenure as mayor, he focused on developing Sibolga's seaport to generate economic growth, and the city received several Adipura awards for cleanliness during his tenure. He was politically affiliated with Golkar and headed the party's Sibolga branch during his political career.

Panggabean was married to Rumintang Uli Lumbantobing, and the couple had four children. One of their daughters, Memory Evaulina Panggabean, was elected a member of Sibolga's DPRD for 2014–2019 and unsuccessfully ran for mayor in 2015. She also married Sibolga's 2010–2015 vice mayor, Marudut Situmorang. He died at the Metta Medika Hospital in Sibolga on 29 October 2018 after receiving medical treatment. He had been suffering from stroke for several years by the time of his death. Panggabean was buried in Sibolga on 1 November.
