= Makam Papan Tinggi =

Mausoleum in North Sumatra, Indonesia

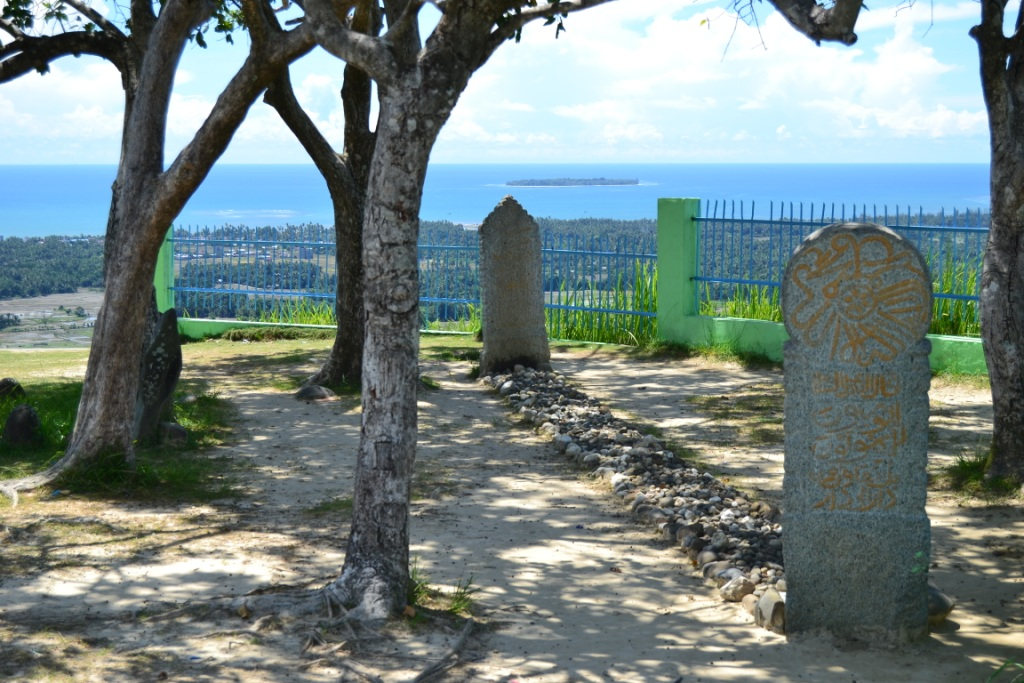
- The tomb of Shaykh Mahmud in the complex

- Location within Indonesia

General information
- Type: mausoleum
- Location: Barus, Central Tapanuli Regency, North Sumatra, Indonesia, 2CP8+3G6, Pananggahan, Barus Utara, Central Tapanuli Regency, North Sumatra 22564, Indonesia, Indonesia
- Coordinates: 2.0351051°N 98.4161895°E

Design and construction
- Known for: Containing seven early Muslim tombs including that of Shaykh Mahmud

Makam Papan Tinggi is a historic funerary complex located at Barus in Central Tapanuli Regency, Indonesia. It contains seven old tombs dating to the 7th or 8th centuries and is located at the top of a hill.

== History ==
One of the first burials was Mahmud ibn 'Abd al-Rahman (d. 664), . He is also known as Shaykh Mahmud. His tomb is at least eight metres long.

In 1990, the government of Barus officially made the Makam Papan Tinggi complex a site for religious tourism. It is still well-visited to this day by both locals and tourists.

== See also ==
- Islam in Indonesia
