= Dipterocarpus cinereus =

Conservation status
- Critically Endangered (IUCN 3.1)

Scientific classification
- Kingdom: Plantae
- Clade: Tracheophytes
- Clade: Angiosperms
- Clade: Eudicots
- Clade: Rosids
- Order: Malvales
- Family: Dipterocarpaceae
- Genus: Dipterocarpus
- Species: D. cinereus

Binomial name
- Dipterocarpus cinereus Slooten

Species of flowering plant

Dipterocarpus cinereus is a species of flowering plant in the family Dipterocarpaceae. It is a tree endemic to Mursala Island, off the west-central coast of Sumatra. It is a large tree with a trunk up to 40 cm in diameter. It grows on hilltops in lowland rain forest between 20 and 370 meters elevation, typically on leached soils. It is threatened by overharvesting for timber and habitat loss from forest clearance for rubber plantations. The IUCN Red List assesses the species as critically endangered, with a total population of only 30 mature individuals and low numbers of seedlings.

The species was first described by Dirk Fok van Slooten in 1927.
