= Tamil inscriptions in Malay world =

A number of medieval inscriptions written in Tamil language and script that have been found in Southeast Asia and China, mainly in Sumatra and peninsular Thailand. These texts arose directly from trade links between south India and certain parts of Southeast Asia and China, which involved the residence in those regions of Tamil-speaking Indians. Several of these overseas Tamil inscriptions mention well-known medieval Indian merchant associations.

A good number of Tamil inscriptions, as well as Hindu and Buddhist icons emanating from South India, have been found in Southeast Asia (and even in Quanzhou in China).

On the Malay Peninsula, inscriptions have been found at Takuapa, not far from the Vishnuite statues of Khao Phra Narai in Southern Thailand. It is a short inscription indicating that an artificial lake named Avani-naranam was dug by Nangur-Udaiyan, which is the name of an individual who possessed a military fief at Nangur, being famous for his abilities as a warrior, and that the lake was placed under the protection of the members of the Manikkiramam (which according to K. A. Nilakanta Sastri, was a merchant guild) living in the military camp. Since Avani-narayana is a surname of the Pallava King Nandivarman III who reigned from 826 to 849, we can deduce the approximate date of this inscription.

In the capital of Tabralinga there is a sanctuary in which there is a bronze image of Ganesa bearing a Tamil inscription Majapisedesa in modern characters.

== Neusu Inscription ==
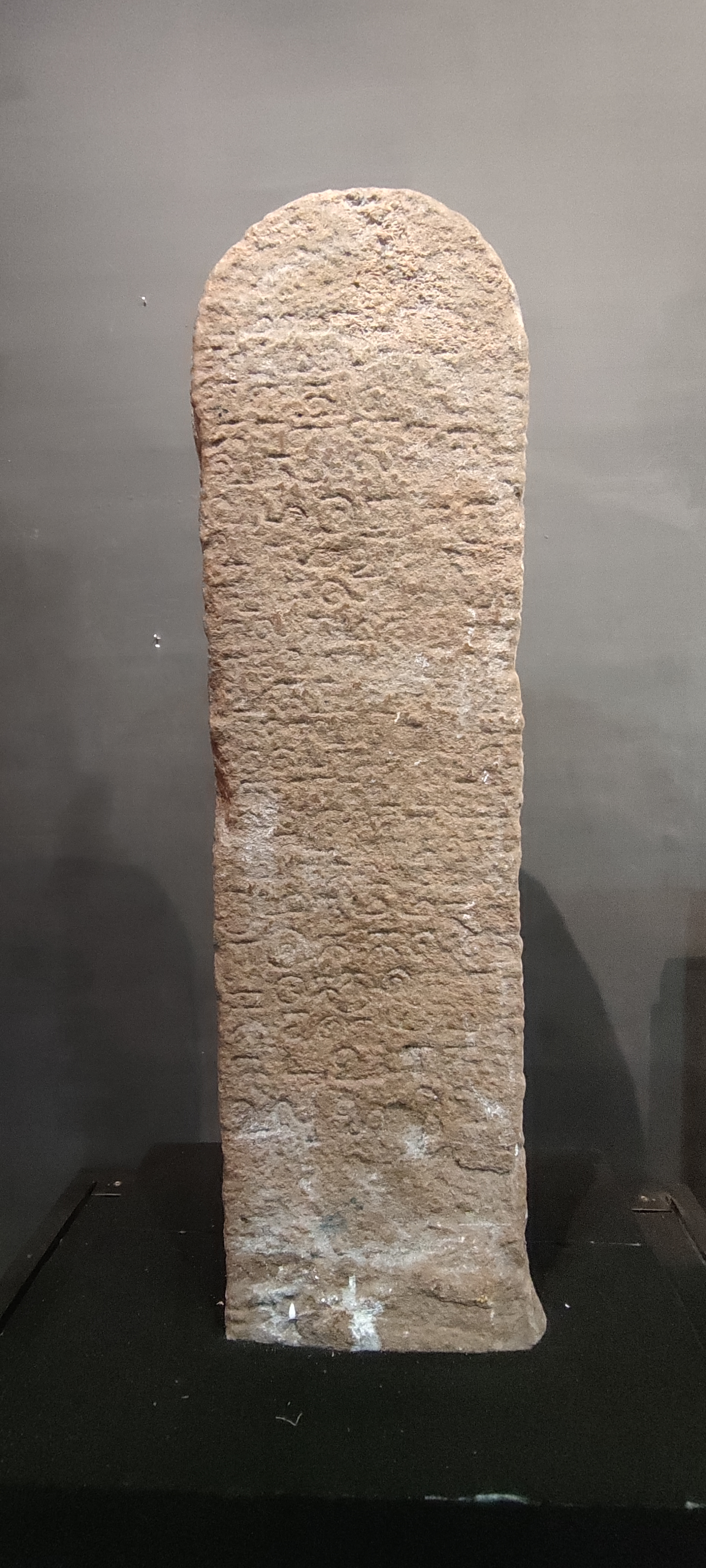
Neusu inscription found in Banda Aceh, now kept at Aceh Museum

A slightly later Tamil language inscription has recently been found at Neusu Aceh, Banda Aceh. The date of the inscription is illegible, but it has been dated palaeographically to about the 12th century, The entire front of the stone is illegible, aside from the isolated word mandapam, presumably relating to a temple foundation or endowment. A provisional translation of the legible portion of the back reads:

"[....] that [we] would not hold (kaikkollakadavadalla); for this decision. [If any violation comes or situation arises against it (?)...those] who put the [royal] emblem (ilachchinal, Sanskrit lancana) will come to take and go (seize?) [....] that [we] would not get or collect (kolludal) interest [in kind] (polisai) [...even] afterwards our people (makkal) would do in accordance with this inscription (ikkalvettuku kokka[okka]). Let there be prosperity."

This provisional reading suggests that the inscription dealt with trading regulations covering losses of goods, the waiving of collection of interest, and perhaps of royal fees. The legible portion of the text does not bear the name of any merchant association, but a reference to "our people" (makkal) may indicate that an association was involved: several inscriptions of this period in southern India connect merchant associations — particularly the Ainnurruvar — with the construction of mandapa or other additions to both Hindu and Buddhist foundations.

== Kedah Inscription ==
In ancient Kedah there is an important and unmistakably Hindu settlement which has been known for about a century now from the discoveries reported by Col. Low and has recently been subjected to a fairly exhaustive investigation by Dr. Quaritch Wales. Dr. Wales investigated no fewer than thirty sites round about Kedah. The results attained show that this site was in continuous occupation by people who came under strong South Indian influences, Buddhist and Hindu, for centuries.

An inscribed stone bar, rectangular in shape, bears the ye-dharmma formula in South Indian characters of the 4th century AD, thus proclaiming the Buddhist character of the shrine near the find-spot (site I) of which only the basement survives. It is inscribed on three faces in Pallava script, or Vatteluttu rounded writing of the 6th century AD, possibly earlier.

== Barus inscription ==
An inscription in the Tamil language, the Lobu Tua Inscription dated 1088 AD, has been found on the western coast of Sumatra island at Lobu Tua, North Sumatra province, Indonesia. It was erected by a Tamil merchant guild, the Ayyavole 500 (“the 500 of the thousand directions”) which enjoyed the patronage of the Chola rulers. The inscription mentions the guild as “having met at the velapuram in Varocu”. “Varocu” is Barus, an ancient port located not far from Lobu Tua, which had played a major role in the camphor and benzoin trade since the 9th century. These valuable products were in high demand in China, India and the Middle East and came from the forests in the northern Sumatra hinterland. From there, they were brought to Barus and exported. Tamil were among the foreign merchants who would come to Barus and buy the camphor and benzoin from local traders.

In 1017 and 1025, the Chola kings had sent fleets to raid ports controlled by Sriwijaya in the Malacca Straits. After these successful attacks, the Chola seem to have been in a position to intervene in the region for the rest of the 11th century. This allowed for an increased presence of Tamil merchant guilds in Sumatra.

== Tanjore Inscription ==
In the ancient city of Tanjore (Thanjavur — ancient name) in Tamil Nadu are inscriptions dating from 1030. which contain a list of the ports in the Malacca Strait raided by a fleet sent by King Rajendra Chola I. The following are the places that Rajendran claims to have raided:

- Sriwijaya (Palembang)
- Pannai (Pannai kingdom)
- Malaiyur (Disputed, either referring to the ancient Melayu Kingdom or the Malay Peninsula.)
- Mayirudingan (the Je-lo-ting of the Chinese on the Malay Peninsula), surrounded by the deep sea as by a moat. Some placed it at the Sathing Phra Peninsular in Songkhla, where the Chinese called Rìluótíng in the 13th–14th century.
- Ilangasokam (Langkasuka)
- Mapappalam (Papphaal, placed by the Sinhalese chronicle Mahavamsa on the coast of Pegu in Burma)
- Mevilimbangam (Kamalanka)
- Valaippanduru (unknown)
- Talaittakkolam (Takkola of Ptolemy and the Milinda Panha, On the isthmus of Kra)
- Madamalingam (Tambralinga, Chinese Tan-ma-ling, of which the center was at Ligor in Southern Thailand), or the Kra Isthmus
- Ilamuridesam (Lamuri of the Arabs, Lambri of Marco Polo at northern Sumatra)
- Manakkavaram (Nicobar Islands)
- Kadaram (Kedah)

== See also ==
- Sanskrit inscriptions in the Malay world
- Tamil bell
