= Gouvernment of Atjeh and Dependencies =

Dutch East Indies administrative division in Sumatra

Gouvernment of Atjeh and Dependencies Gouvernement Atjèh en Onderhoorigheden
- Governorate of the Dutch East Indies
- 1898–1938
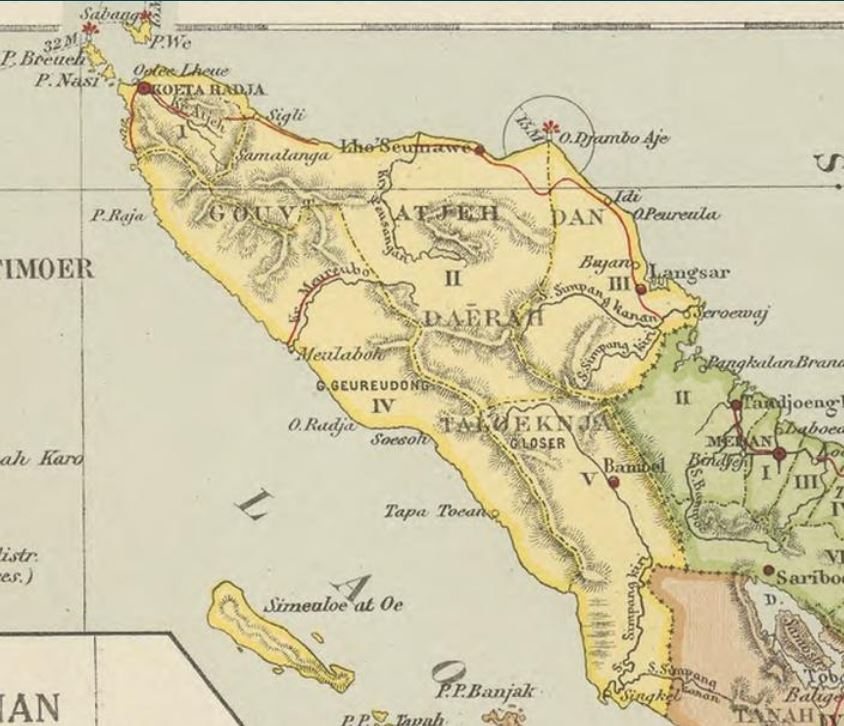
- 1909 Malay-language map of Gouvernement Atjeh
- Capital: Koetaradja
- History
  - Established: 1898
  - Disestablished: 1938
Succeeded by
Atjeh and Dependencies Residency
- Today part of: Aceh, Indonesia

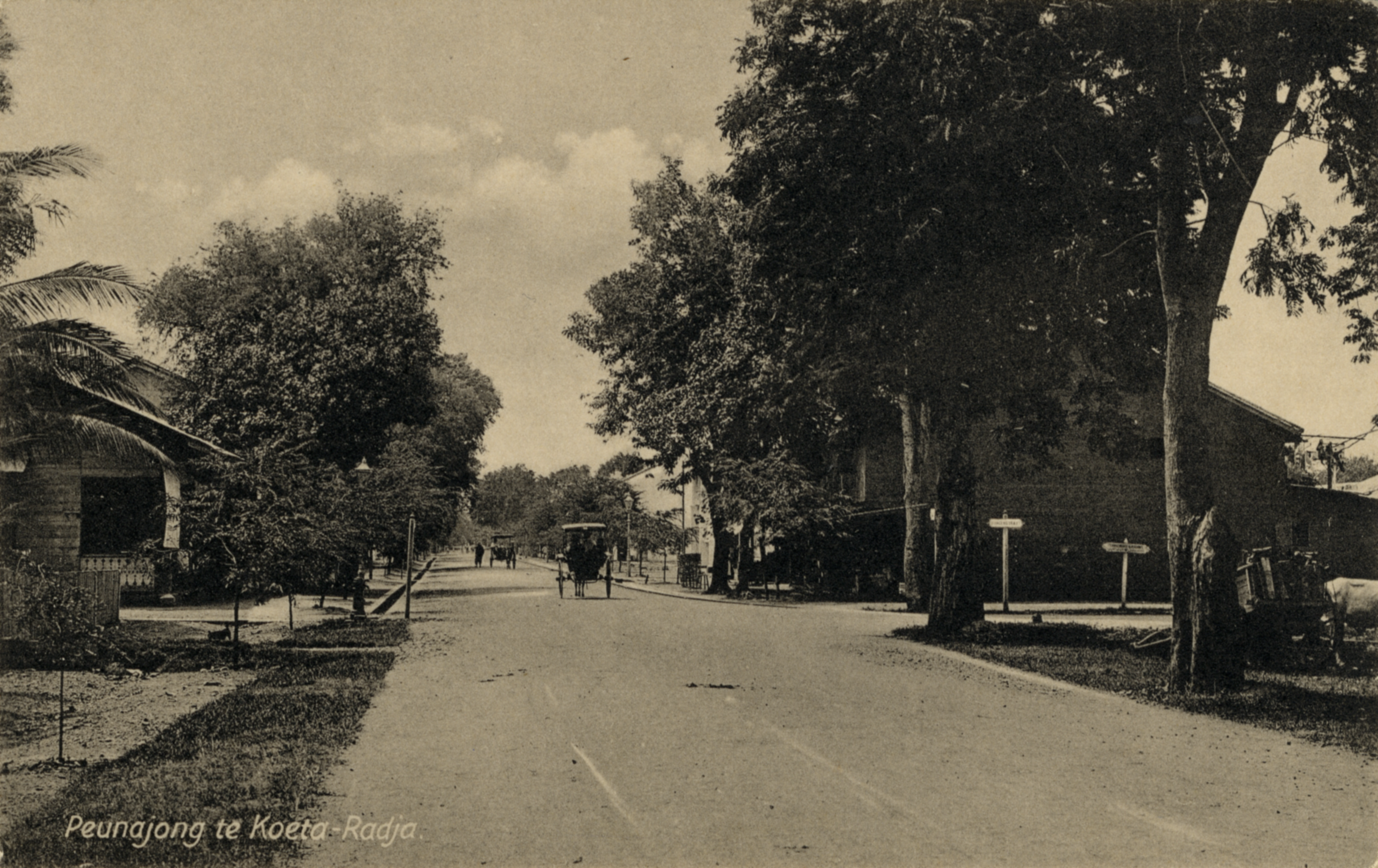
Koeta-Radja street scene c.1910

The Gouvernment of Atjeh and Dependencies (Dutch: Gouvernement Atjèh en Onderhoorigheden) was an administrative subdivision (governorate) of the Dutch East Indies located in northern Sumatra in the region of present-day Aceh, Indonesia which existed from the late nineteenth century to 1938. The capital of the governorate was at Koetaradja (now called Banda Aceh). In 1938, due to a reorganization of the government structure of the Indies, it no longer had a governor and became a Residency instead, called the Atjeh and Dependencies Residency (Dutch: Residentie Atjèh en Onderhoorigheden).

== History ==
The Governorate of Atjeh and Dependencies was created by the Dutch during the Aceh War in the territory of the Aceh Sultanate which they were attempting to conquer; thus although it was created in the late nineteenth century it did not control a large territory for some time. Part of the reason for their success was their coopting of local elites to participate in their rule. At the turn of the twentieth century it was ruled by a military-civilian governor and a Resident for Acehnese Affairs (Dutch: resident voor de Atjèhsche zaken) as well as several Assistant Residents. The government structure of Atjeh was significantly influenced by the Orientalist Christiaan Snouck Hurgronje. The borders were redrawn as well; in 1902 and 1904 Trumon and Singkil were transferred to Atjeh from Tapanoeli Residency.

Even after the end of the Aceh War, the region was not truly pacified by the Dutch and conflicts continued in remote areas until the end of Dutch rule. Nonetheless, as they increased their control of the region with the end of the main conflict the Dutch built a significant amount of infrastructure after 1908, including a road system, trolleys, and businesses. They also purged many of the former ulama and village heads who had been loyal to the Sultanate and replaced them with their underlings or relatives who would be willing to collaborate.

Starting in 1901 and lasting into the final decades of Dutch rule, there was significant exploration and extraction of Petroleum in this Residency.

The Governorate was subdivided in 1914 into 5 divisions (Dutch: afdeeling), each with an assistant resident:

- Groot-Atjèh with the seat of the assistant resident at Koeta-Radja, including also Sabang, Ulèë Lheuë, and Lhoknga;
- Noordkust van Atjèh with the seat of the assistant resident at Lhokseumawe, including also Sigli, Meureudu, Bireuën, Lhoksukon, and Takengon;
- Oostkust van Atjèh with the seat of the assistant resident at Langsa, including also Idi Rayeuk, Temijang, Sërbödjadi, and Gayo Lues;
- Westkust van Atjèh with the seat of the assistant resident at Meulaboh, including also Calang, Tapaktuan, Singkil, and Simeulue;
- and Alaslanden with a lower-level official with a seat at Kutacane.

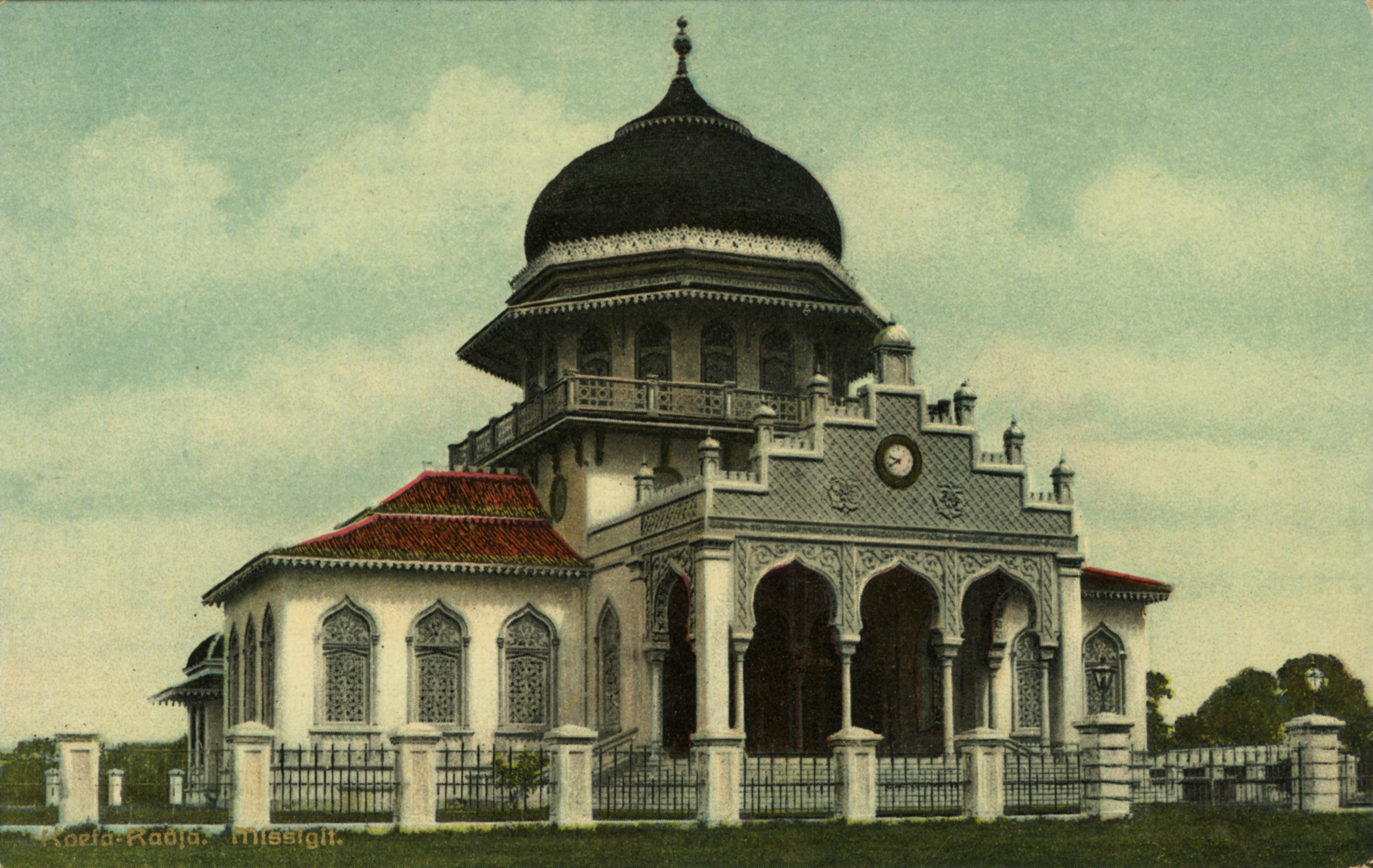
Mosque in Koeta-Radja, circa 1910

In 1938, all of the various Residencies and Gouvernements in Sumatra were reorganized under the new Gouvernement of Sumatra. Therefore Atjeh no longer had a governor and became a Residency instead: the Atjeh and Dependencies Residency (Dutch: Residentie Atjeh en Onderhoorigheden). Its only resident was J. Pauw, who held office from 1938 until the Japanese invasion of the Dutch East Indies in 1942. During the Indonesian National Revolution after the Japanese departure, the Residency was abolished and, after briefly being made a province by the Republic of Indonesia in December 1949, it became part of the province of North Sumatra. However, the basic administrative subdivisions were used as Regencies in Indonesia, with some changes.
