= Sibolga Bay =

Coordinates: 1.6488°N 98.7985°E

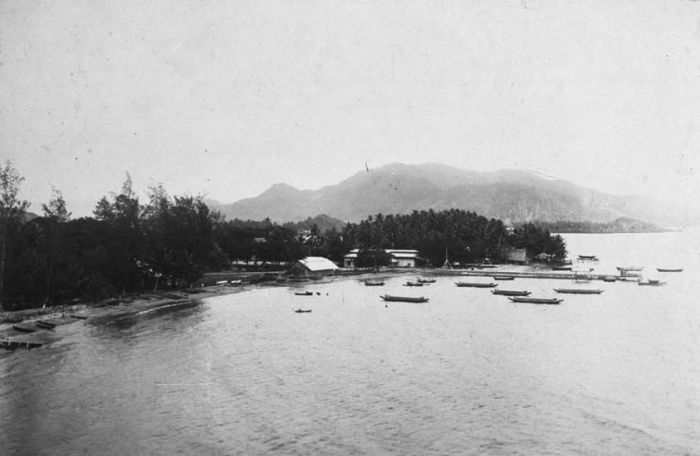
The Harbour of Sibolga, c. 1910-1920

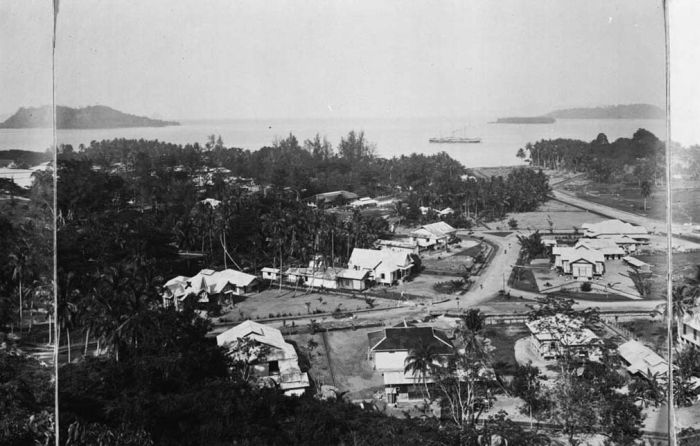
View of Sibolga Bay over the old European quarter, 1917

Sibolga Bay (formerly known by the Dutch Baai van Tapanoeli, literally The Bay of Tapanoeli; alternatively Tapanuli Bay) is a natural harbour on the west coast of North Sumatra, Sumatra, Indonesia. It is named after the city of Sibolga which is located inside of the bay.

In terms of wildlife, the waters of the bay are home to a large coral reef ecosystem. The bay lends its name to the species Pongo Tapanuliensis, or the Tapanuli orangutan, a critically endangered great ape native to the region surrounding the bay.

There are a few islands in the bay, one of which was formerly controlled by the English and the Dutch.

== Tsunamis ==
The area is relatively exposed to tsunamis. Notable instances of tsunamis in the area include one in 1852 and one in 1935, the latter of which reportedly destroyed multiple huts. The December 26, 2004 Indian Ocean earthquake and tsunami hit the area hard.

== See also ==
- Sibolga
- Central Tapanuli Regency
