= Barus =

Town and kecamatan (district) in Sumatra, Indonesia

Coordinates: 2.0000°N 98.4000°E

Map showing the location of Barus on the west coast of Sumatra

Barus is a town and kecamatan (district) in Central Tapanuli Regency, North Sumatra Province, Sumatra, Indonesia. Historically, Barus was well known as a port town or kingdom on the western coast of Sumatra where it was a regional trade center from around the 7th or earlier until the 17th century. It was also known by other names, namely Fansur and possibly Barusai. The name Fansur or Pansur means "spring of water" or "a place where water flows" in the local Batak language. Barus was well known for its production of camphor. In the 16th century, Barus became absorbed into the rising power of the Aceh Sultanate. The earliest known Malay poet Hamzah Fansuri may be from Barus as indicated by his name.

== Historical records ==
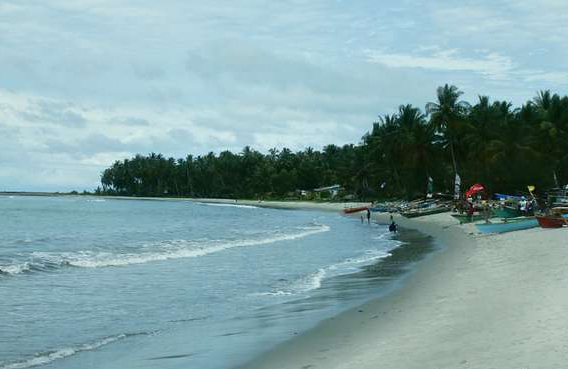
The beach at Barus

Barus was a significant settlement on the west coast of Sumatra widely recorded in many historical documents. Other related sites in Sumatra include Lamuri in Aceh and Pannai in North Sumatra. The second-century Greek geographer Claudius Ptolemy in his work Geography recorded the name Barusai (or Barousai) (Ancient Greek: Βαροῦσαι) as a group of five islands, which some scholars believe to refer to islands facing the Western Sumatran coast at Barus. The Indian text Mañjuśrī-mūla-kalpa refers to a Warusaka that may be Barus. In 4th Chinese records, the name "Po-lu" is found, suggested to mean Barus or the northern part of Sumatra. During the Tang dynasty, the Chinese traveller Yijing mentioned the island of Polushi (婆魯師洲) to the west of Palembang where Mulasarvastivada Buddhism was practiced. Arabic language sources use the name Fansur or Pansur, the 9th-century Persian geographer Ibn Khurdadhbih also used the term the "island of Bālūs", although the Arabs appeared to consider Bālūs different from Fansur. Around 900 Ahmad ibn Rustah called Fansur "a well-known country in the Indies" and wrote about its jurisdiction.

The best-known commodity produced and traded in Barus was camphor, locally known as kapur barus (lit. "Barus' chalk"). One of the earliest mentions of Barus in Muslim sources may be by Sulaiman who wrote in 851 of gold mines and "plantations called Fansur, where one obtains a superior quality of camphor". In the 10th century, Al-Masudi wrote that "... the land of Fansur, whence is derived the fansuri camphor, which is only found there in large quantities in the years that have many storms and earthquakes". In the 13th century, the Chinese writer Zhao Rukuo （or Chau Ju-kua, 趙汝适）wrote in Zhu Fan Zhi that Binsu (賓窣, Pansur) was one of the countries producing camphor. According to the Venetian traveller Marco Polo, the camphor from Fansur was the best in the world, it's quality "so fine that it sells for its weight in fine gold".

Barus may have been an important site during the Srivijaya period; Xin Tangshu says that "Srivijaya is a double kingdom and the two parts have separate administration", and that its western kingdom was Barus. There may have been Tamil presence in the 11th century; four inscribed stones have been found in Barus, and one in Tamil known as the Lobu Tua Inscription has been dated to 1088. It named the local inhabitants as Zabedj, a name also found in Arabic sources as Zabag or Zabaj and may refer here to the Batak people. A 13th-century source mentions that there were once Christians there, although no trace of these early Christians remains. In Indonesian sources, Barus is mentioned in Carita Parahyangan as one of the conquests of King Sanjaya. It is also named in the 1365 Old Javanese epic poem Nagarakretagama as one of the vassal states of the Majapahit that formed part of 'tanah ri Malayu'.

Barus has not been located in the same place all through its history; a Batak chronicle mentions that Barus had moved three times. Older sites may decline and become abandoned. In the 16th century, Barus was a prosperous port; the Portuguese writer Tomé Pires mentioned in Suma Oriental the "very rich kingdom of Baros" that was also known to people from many nations as "Panchur" or "Pansur". The first known Malay poet Hamzah Fansuri may have been either born or raised in Barus in this period. Barus was then dominated by the Aceh Sultanate around the middle of the 16th century and an Acehnese Panglima or governor was stationed there. Later it came under the influence of the Dutch East India Company in 1668 after they ousted the Acehnese Panglima. The area also came under the influence of the Minangkabaus and became part of the Malay cultural sphere.

== Archaeology ==
Archaeological excavations at several sites around Barus have uncovered significant evidence of human settlement and trading activity. These settlements were inhabited at different times. A site a few miles to the north of modern Barus at Lubok Tua (or Lobu Tua) produced artifacts of Chinese, Arab, Egyptian, Persian, and Indian origin. Lubok Tua however was abandoned around the turn of the 12th century. A site at Bukit Hasang was settled in the mid-12th century and abandoned in the 15th but resettled again in the late 15th to mid-16th century. Tombstones found in the area, of which one of the earliest may be dated to 1370, indicate Arabic, Persian, and possibly Chinese influences or presence. The site at Kedai Gadang was occupied from the 13th to the 19th century.

Gold and silver coins found in Barus indicate it may have produced a currency as early as the 10th century, which may be the earliest found in Sumatra.

== Present-day Barus ==
Barus district in Central Tapanuli Regency

Barus at present is a small town and a district in the Central Tapanuli Regency in North Sumatra. It is located to the northwest of Sibolga along the Sumatran coast. There are two main kampungs in the town. Both are located along the Batu Gerigis River, one upstream (Mudik) and one downstream (Hilir), with the one downstream on the river mouth now the center, although in the past the one upstream was more important. Historically, the Barus population is a mixed people descended from the Minangkabau, Batak, and Acehnese, known as the ethnic of Pesisir (Pasisia).

Located near the town of Barus and in Northern Barus are the Islamic funerary monuments, the Mahligai Tomb Complex and Makam Papan Tinggi which have been developed as tourist attractions.

== See also ==
- Srivijaya
- Lobu Tua Inscription
