= Pandan, Central Tapanuli =

Coordinates: 1°40′57″N 98°49′30″E

Pandan
- Town of Pandan; Kota Pandan
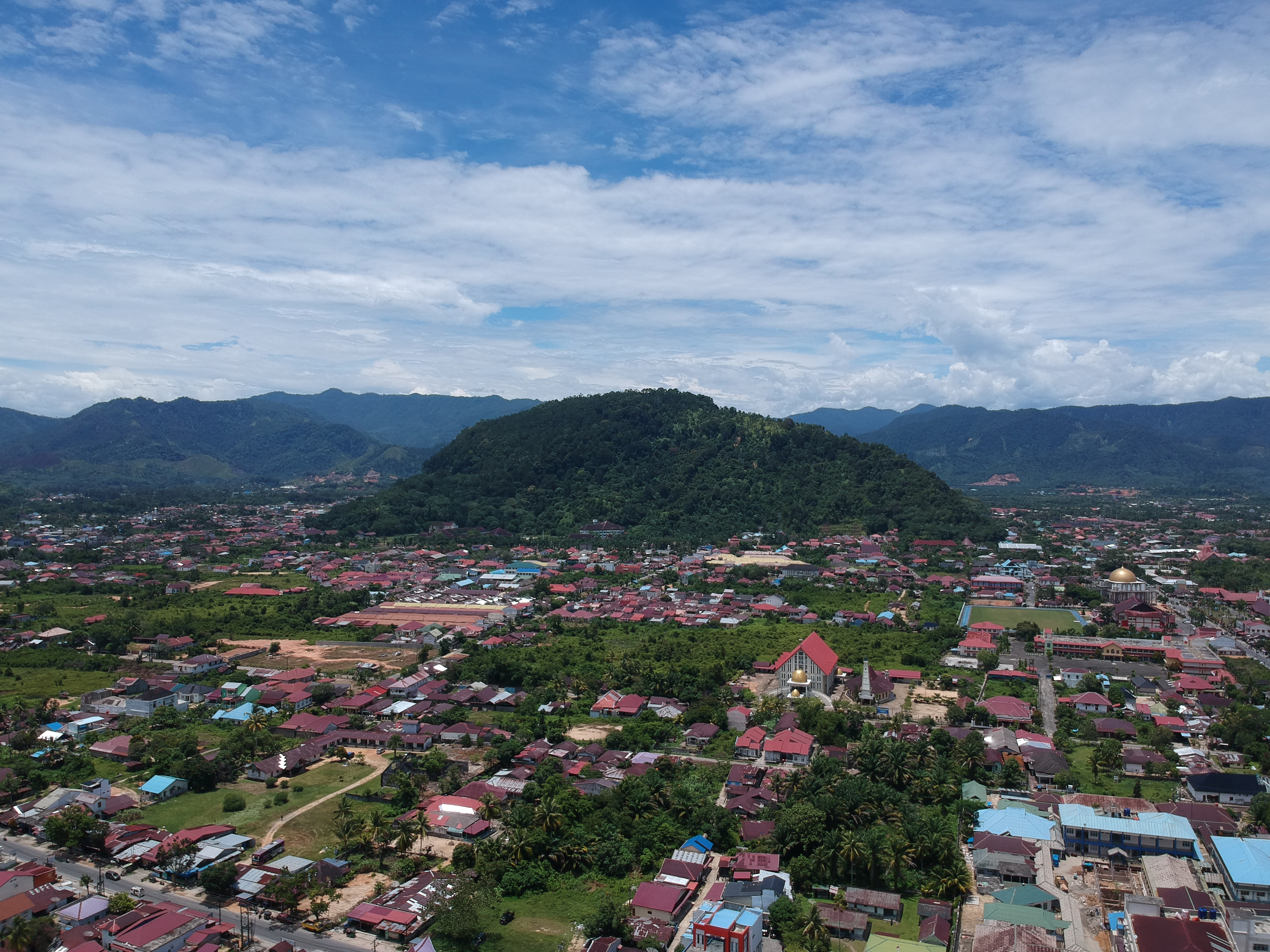
- Town of Pandan
- Interactive map of Pandan

Pandan is a town in North Sumatra province of Indonesia and it is the seat (capital) of Central Tapanuli Regency.

== Climate ==
Pandan has a tropical rainforest climate (Af) with heavy to very heavy rainfall year-round:

Climate data for Pandan
Month	Jan	Feb	Mar	Apr	May	Jun	Jul	Aug	Sep	Oct	Nov	Dec	Year
Mean daily maximum °C (°F)	28.3 (82.9)	29.1 (84.4)	29.7 (85.5)	29.6 (85.3)	29.5 (85.1)	29.2 (84.6)	28.9 (84.0)	28.7 (83.7)	28.9 (84.0)	29.1 (84.4)	28.8 (83.8)	28.4 (83.1)	29.0 (84.2)
Daily mean °C (°F)	25.4 (77.7)	25.9 (78.6)	26.4 (79.5)	26.7 (80.1)	27.0 (80.6)	26.9 (80.4)	26.6 (79.9)	26.5 (79.7)	26.5 (79.7)	26.4 (79.5)	25.9 (78.6)	26.5 (79.7)	27.0 (80.6)
Mean daily minimum °C (°F)	23.6 (74.5)	24.1 (75.4)	24.1 (75.4)	24.6 (76.3)	25.0 (77.0)	24.9 (76.8)	24.7 (76.5)	24.6 (76.3)	24.5 (76.1)	24.3 (75.7)	24.1 (75.4)	23.9 (75.0)	24.4 (75.9)
Average rainfall mm (inches)	208 (8.2)	141 (5.6)	216 (8.5)	252 (9.9)	228 (9.0)	179 (7.0)	170 (6.7)	177 (7.0)	176 (6.9)	258 (10.2)	336 (13.2)	321 (12.6)	2,662 (104.8)
Source: Climate Data
