= Sibolga =

City in North Sumatra, Indonesia

- City
- City of Sibolga; Kota Sibolga

Other transcription(s)
  - Batak: ᯘᯪᯅᯬᯞ᯲ᯎ
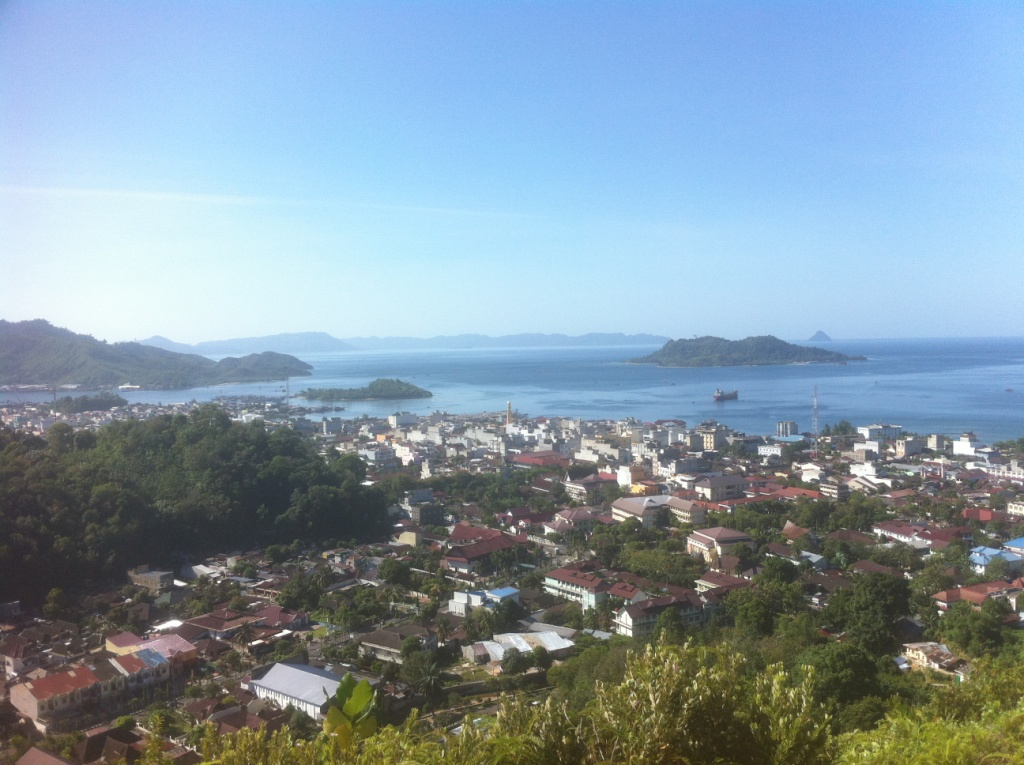
- Sibolga view from Simarbarimbing hill, 2016, with Sibolga Bay and Poncan Island in the background

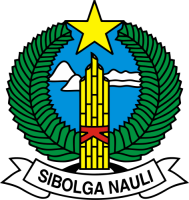
- Seal

- Location within North Sumatra

- Location in Sumatra and Indonesia Sibolga (Indonesia)
- Coordinates: 1°44′24″N 98°46′48″E
- Country: Indonesia
- Province: North Sumatra

Government
  - Mayor: Akhmad Syukri Nazri Penarik (Nasdem)
  - Vice Mayor: Pantas Maruba Lumbantobing (Nasdem)
  - Chairman of City's Council of Representatives: Ansyar Afandi Paranginangin (Nasdem)
  - Vice Chairman of City's Council of Representatives: Andika Pribadi Waruwu (Gerindra)

Area
  - Total: 11.47 km^{2} (4.43 sq mi)

Population (mid 2025 estimate)
  - Total: 92,244
  - Density: 8,042/km^{2} (20,830/sq mi)
- Time zone: UTC+7 (Indonesia Western Time)
- Area code: (+62) 631
- Website: www.sibolgakota.go.id

Sibolga (formerly sometimes Siboga) is a city and a port located in the natural harbour of Sibolga Bay on the west coast of North Sumatra province, in Indonesia.

The city is located on the western side of North Sumatra facing the Indian Ocean, is a transit harbour to Nias Island, and was hard hit during the 2004 Indian Ocean earthquake. Sibolga is also a semi-enclave within Central Tapanuli Regency, as Sibolga borders Central Tapanuli Regency in the north, east, and south, while it borders the Mentawai Strait in the west.

The city has an area of 11.47 km^{2} (4.43 sq mi) — the smallest city by land area in Indonesia. It had a population of 84,444 at the 2010 census and 89,584 at the 2020 census; the official estimate as of mid 2025 was 92,244 (comprising 46,365 males and 45,879 females).

== History ==
Poncan Ketek Island (Small Poncan Island) in Sibolga Bay was once the location of a fort, with British, Dutch, French, and American traders passing through. It is thought Stamford Raffles passed through before he moved to Bengkulu in southern Sumatra. From Bengkulu Raffles, after relinquishing the port to the Dutch, established the trade port that became Singapore.

At some point between 1890 and 1920, there was a major fire in the city, which was presumably mostly built from wood from the surrounding mountains (shown partly denuded in the 1928 panorama below).

After the Japanese invasion of Sumatra in 1942, a makeshift prison described as a "civilian camp" was set up at Taroetoengweg, in the city center, from 16 March to 4 May 1942. It first housed 10 "European" men from in and around Sibolga, who were then joined on April 24 by another 10 men from the island of Nias. On May 4 they were taken to the Native Secondary School for Boys in Pearadja (Taroetoeng), located in the mountains behind Sibolga.

== Administrative districts ==
The city is divided into four districts (kecamatan), tabulated below with their areas and their populations at the 2010 census and the 2020 census, together with the official estimates as of mid 2025. The table also includes the number of administrative villages or subdistricts (all classed as urban kelurahan) in each district and its postcodes.

Kode Wilayah	Name of District (kecamatan)	Area in km^{2}	Pop'n census 2010	Pop'n census 2020	Pop'n estimate mid 2025	No. of subdistricts	Post codes
12.73.01	Sibolga Utara (North Sibolga)	6.02	19,970	21,383	22,096	5	22511 -22514
12.73.02	Sibolga Kota (Sibolga Town)	1.27	14,304	15,172	15,608	4	22521 -22524
12.73.03	Sibolga Selatan (South Sibolga)	3.29	30,082	33,346	34,681	4	22533 -22538
12.73.04	Sibolga Sambas	0.90	20,125	19,683	19,859	4	22531 -22535
	Totals	11.47	84,441	89,584	92,244	17	

== Transport and tourism ==
Buses are available from Medan, Parapat, and Padang. Ferries from here service the outlying islands to the west, Simeulue and Nias, as well as the rest of Indonesia. Sibolga is a step-off point for trade and passenger boats to Nias Island. The local airport is Ferdinand Lumban Tobing Airport.

== Climate ==
This area has a tropical rainforest climate with no real dry season. Regions with this climate typically feature tropical rainforests, and are designated by the Köppen climate classification as "Af".

Climate data for Sibolga
Month	Jan	Feb	Mar	Apr	May	Jun	Jul	Aug	Sep	Oct	Nov	Dec	Year
Mean daily maximum °C (°F)	31 (87)	31 (88)	31 (88)	31 (87)	31 (88)	31 (88)	31 (87)	30 (86)	29 (85)	30 (86)	30 (86)	31 (87)	31 (87)
Mean daily minimum °C (°F)	23 (74)	23 (74)	23 (74)	24 (75)	24 (75)	23 (74)	23 (73)	23 (73)	23 (73)	23 (73)	23 (74)	23 (73)	23 (74)
Average precipitation mm (inches)	300 (11.8)	280 (11.0)	390 (15.4)	420 (16.5)	310 (12.2)	230 (9.1)	280 (11.0)	350 (13.8)	370 (14.6)	490 (19.3)	450 (17.7)	420 (16.5)	4,290 (168.9)
Source: Weatherbase

== Gallery ==
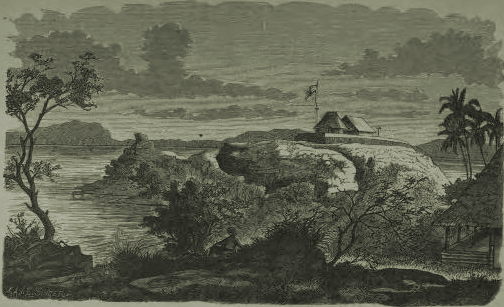
Fort Tapanuli on Poncan Ketek Island in 1878

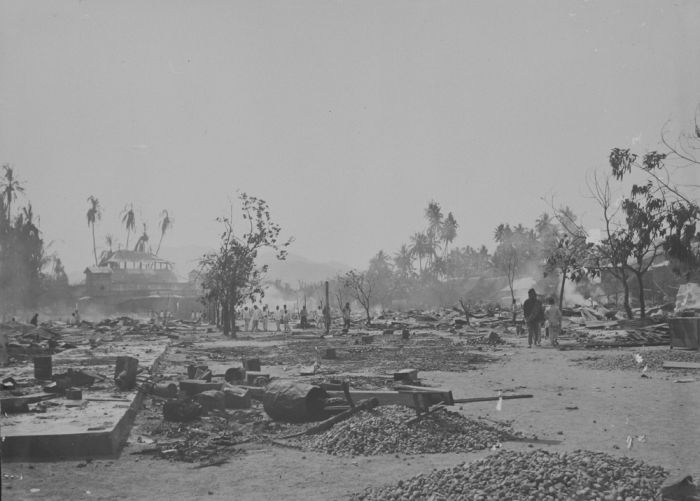
Devastation after the fire (ca. 1890–1920)

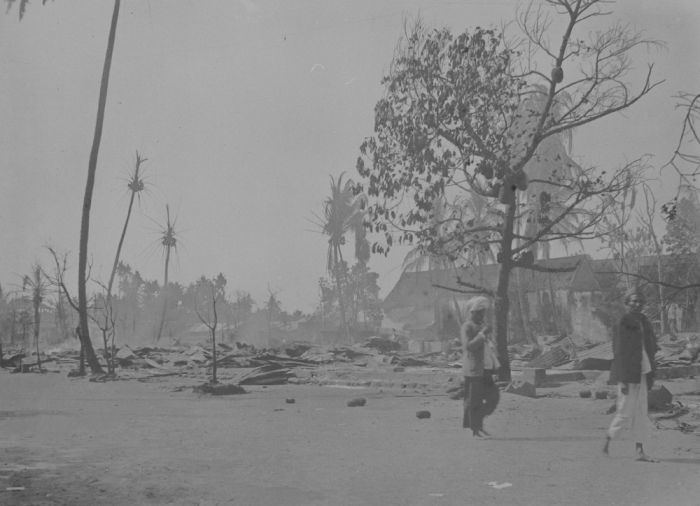
Devastation after the fire (ca. 1890–1920)

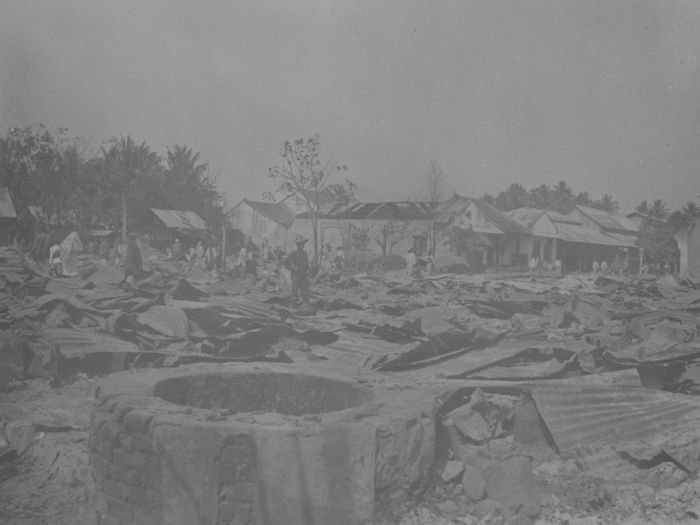
Devastation after the fire (ca. 1890–1920)

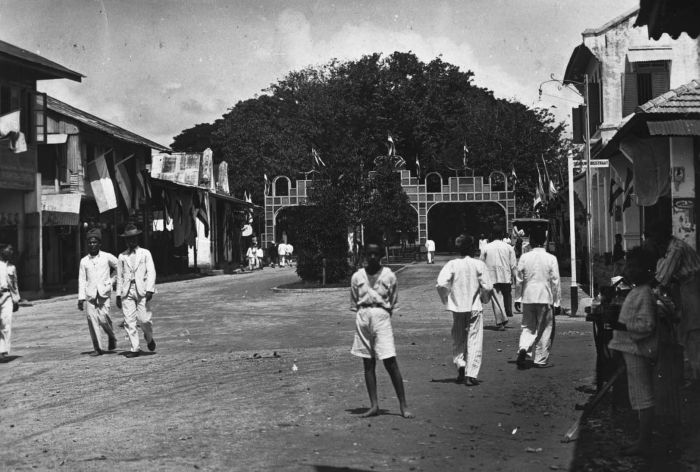
Entrance gate to Sibolga's Chinese Quarter, 1920

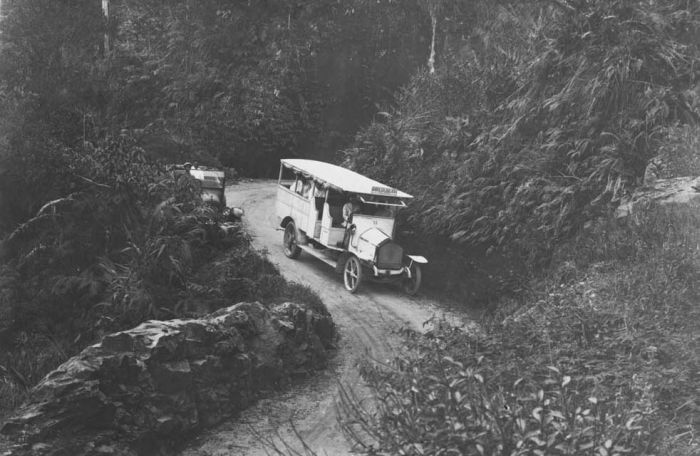
Government bus descending Sibolga's mountain road, June 1919

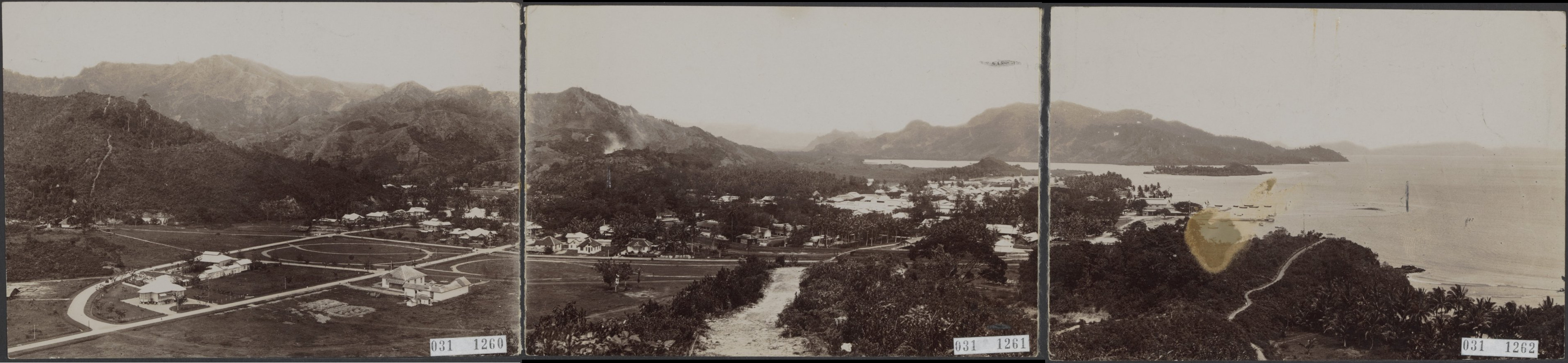
Panorama of Sibolga, 1928
