= Central Tapanuli Regency =

Regency in North Sumatra, Indonesia

Coordinates: 1.9000°N 98.6667°E

Central Tapanuli Regency Kabupaten Tapanuli Tengah
- Regency
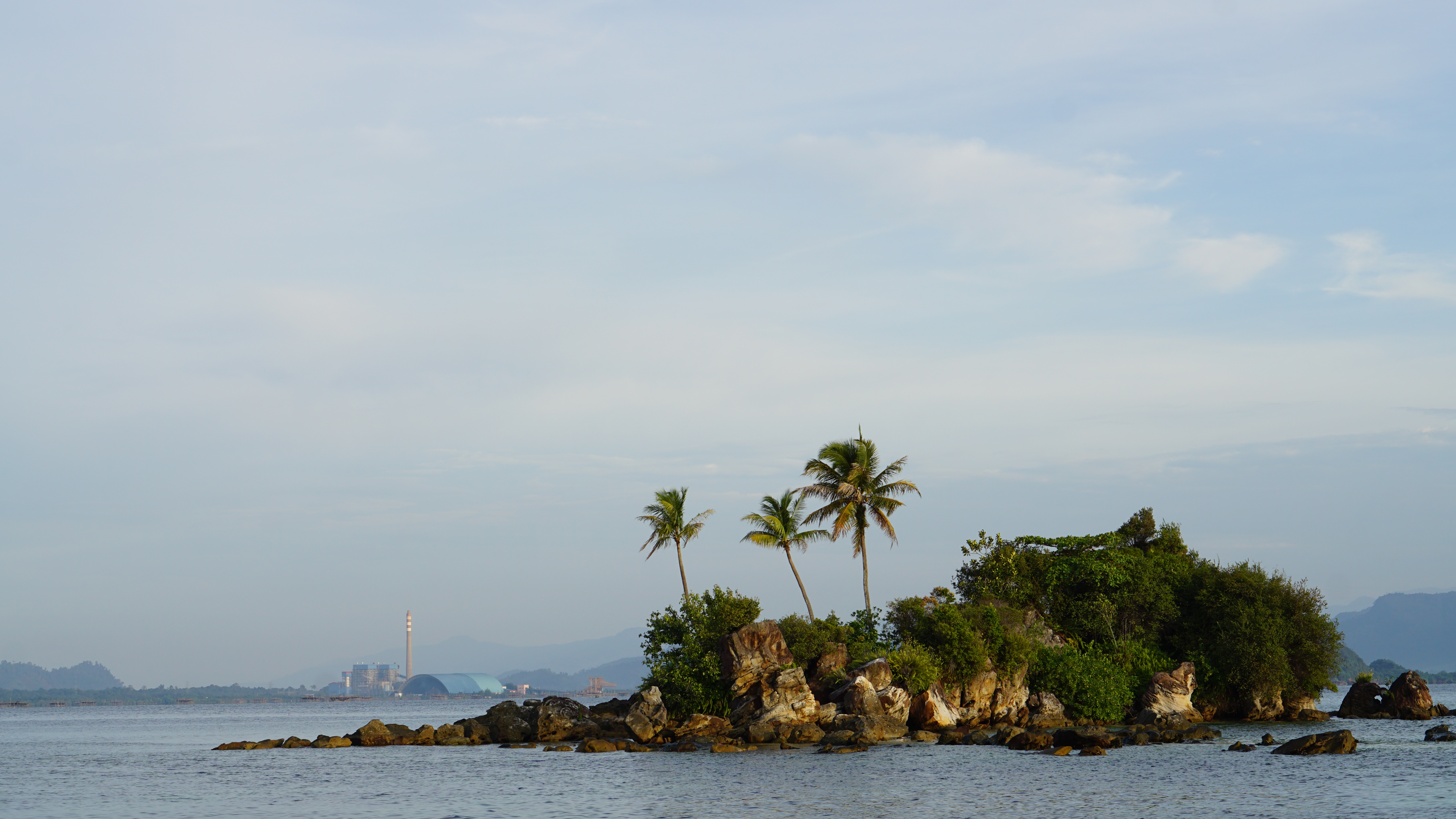
- View of Labuhan Angin Powerplant from Poncan Island

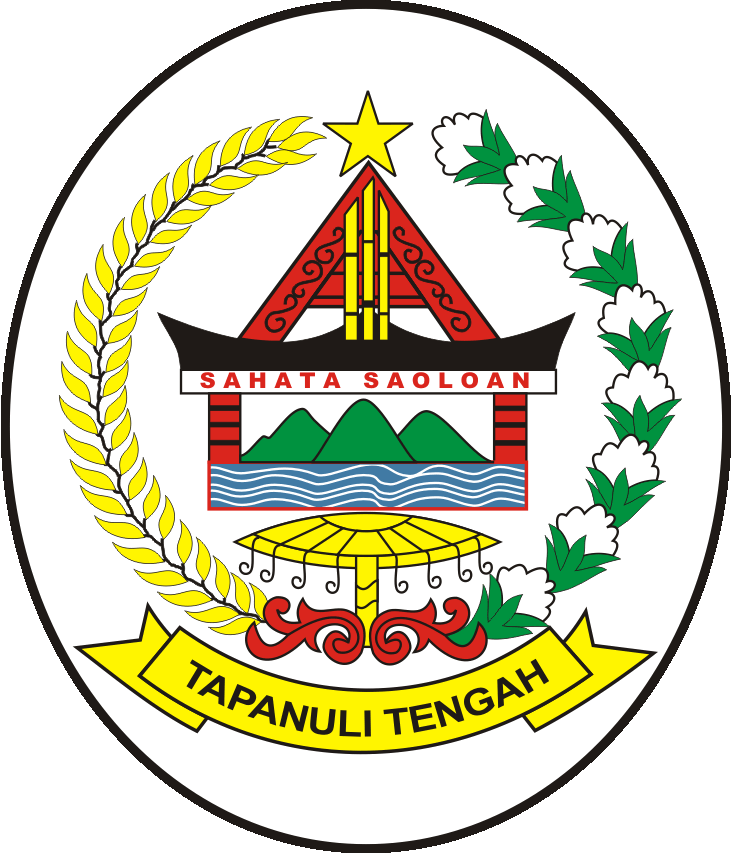
- Seal
- Motto: Sahata Saoloan; Agree
- Country: Indonesia
- Province: North Sumatra
- Regency seat: Pandan

Government
  - Regent: Masinton Pasaribu
  - Vice Regent: Mahmud Efendi Lubis
  - Chairman of Regency's Council of Representatives: Khairul Kiyedi Pasaribu (Nasdem) (Acting)
  - Vice Chairman of Regency's Council of Representatives: Agus Fitriadi Panggabean (Golkar) (Acting)

Area
  - Total: 2,194.98 km^{2} (847.49 sq mi)

Population (mid 2025 estimate)
  - Total: 402,904
  - Density: 183.557/km^{2} (475.411/sq mi)
- Time zone: UTC+7 (WIB)
- Website: www.tapteng.go.id

Central Tapanuli Regency (Tapanuli Tengah in Indonesia) is a regency in North Sumatra province, Sumatra, Indonesia. The seat of the regency government is at Pandan. The regency covers an area of 2,194.98 km^{2} and consists of a long extent of land along the western coast of North Sumatra, together with offshore islands of which the largest is Mursala Island; it had a population of 311,232 at the 2010 census and 365,177 at the 2020 Census; the official estimate as of mid 2025 was 402,904 (comprising 203,302 males and 199,602 females). The regency surrounds the landward side of the city of Sibolga, which is administratively separate from the regency.

== Administrative districts ==
The regency is divided into twenty districts (kecamatan), tabulated below with their areas and their populations at the 2010 Census and the 2020 Census, together with the official estimates as of mid 2025 (note there is a discrepancy in the official estimates between the sum of the district populations and the overall regency population). The table also includes the locations of the district administrative centres, the number of administrative villages in each district (totaling 160 rural desa (villages) and 55 urban kelurahan (urban village), and its postcode.

Kode Wilayah	Name of District (kecamatan)	Area in km^{2}	Pop'n Census 2010	Pop'n Census 2020	Pop'n Estimate mid 2025	Admin centre	No. of desa	No. of kelurahan	Post code
12.01.04	Pinangsori	78.32	22,550	25,552	26,463	Pinangsori	5	5 ^{(a)}	22653
12.01.15	Badiri	129.49	21,973	27,237	28,707	Lopian	7	2 ^{(b)}	22654
12.01.08	Sibabangun	284.64	16,395	18,412	18,824	Sibabangun	6	1 ^{(c)}	22655
12.01.19	Lumut	105.98	11,160	12,749	13,255	Aek Gambir	5	1 ^{(d)}	22652
12.01.18	Sukabangun	49.37	2,866	3,849	4,425	Pulo Pakkat I	6	-	22656
12.01.03	Pandan (town)	34.31	47,106	59,056	56,319	Pasar Baru	2	20 ^{(e)}	22611: 22616
12.01.14	Tukka	150.93	11,376	14,343	14,804	Tukka	4	5 ^{(f)}	22617: 22618
12.01.20	Sarudik	25.92	20,976	22,258	19,343	Pondok Batu	1	4 ^{(g)}	22611: 22616
12.01.07	Tapian Nauli ^{(h)}	83.01	18,459	20,507	19,985	Tapian Nauli II	8	1 ^{(c)}	22618
12.01.13	Sitahuis	50.52	5,040	5,897	5,797	Nauli	5	1 ^{(c)}	22611
	Southeast sector	992.49	177,901	209,860	207,922		49	40	
12.01.06	Kolang	436.29	15,957	20,827	21,110	Kolang Nauli	12	2 ^{(j)}	22562
12.01.02	Sorkam	80.61	15,993	16,511	17,529	Sorkam	17	4 ^{(k)}	22560
12.01.10	Sorkam Barat (West Sorkam)	44.58	14,734	17,598	17,769	Sorkam Kanan	10	2 ^{(m)}	22561
12.01.16	Pasaribu Tobing	103.36	6,467	7,517	7,578	Pasaribu Tobing	9	-	22563
12.01.01	Barus	21.81	15,645	17,480	18,648	Padang Masiang	11	2 ^{(n)}	22564
12.01.09	Sosorgadong	143.13	12,461	14,598	15,215	Sosor Gadong	8	1 ^{(c)}	22568
12.01.12	Andam Dewi	122.42	14,057	16,191	17,449	Rina Bolak	13	1 ^{(c)}	22651
12.01.17	Barus Utara (North Barus)	63.02	4,155	4,844	4,969	Hutaginjang	6	-	22567
12.01.05	Manduamas	99.55	19,449	22,951	24,165	Pasar Onan Manduamas	17	3 ^{(p)}	22565
12.01.11	Sirandorung	87.72	13,413	16,800	18,436	Bajamas	7	1 ^{(c)}	22566
	Northwest sector	1,202.49	132,331	155,317	162,868		110	16	
	Totals	2,194.98	311,232	365,177	370,790	Pandan	158	56	

Notes: (a) comprising Albion Prancis, Pinang Baru, Pinangsori, Sitonong Bangun and Sori Nauli. (b) comprising Lopian and Huta Balang. (c) the district administrative centre, as named. (d) Lumut kelurahan.
(e) comprising Aek Sitiotio, Aek Tolang, Budi Luhur, Hajoran, Hajoran Indah, Kalangan, Kalangan Indah, Lubuk Tukko, Lubuk Tukko Baru, Mangga Dua, Muara Nibung, Pandan, Pandan Wangi, Pasar Baru, Sibuluan Baru, Sibuluan Indah, Sibuluan Nauli, Sibuluan Raya, Sibuluan Terpadu and Sihaporas Nauli.
(f) comprising Aek Tolang Induk, Bona Lumban, Hutanabolon, Sipange and Tukka. (g) comprising Pasir Bidang, Pondok Batu, Sarudik and Sibuluan Nalambok.
(h) includes Mursala Island and 18 smaller islands off the coast. (j) comprising Kolang Nauli and Pasar Onan Hurlang.
(k) comprising Sorkam, Naipospos Barat,and Pargarutan Tarutung Bolak. (m) comprising Sorkam Kanan and Binasi.
(n) comprising Padang Masiang and Pasar Batu Gerigis. (p) comprising Binjohara, Pasar Onan Manduamas and Perluasan.

== Tourist sites ==
Central Tapanuli's beaches are ideal for surfing, although they are not as well known as those of Nias Island. The regency has 30 offshore islands; one of the biggest is Mursala Island with 8,000 hectares (1 hour by motorboat from Sibolga), which has a waterfall that directly drops to the sea; around 100 metres from the waterfall the water still tastes plain and the corals are unique and beautiful. In 1933, the first King Kong film has taken pictures here.
