= Indian Indonesians =

Ethnic group

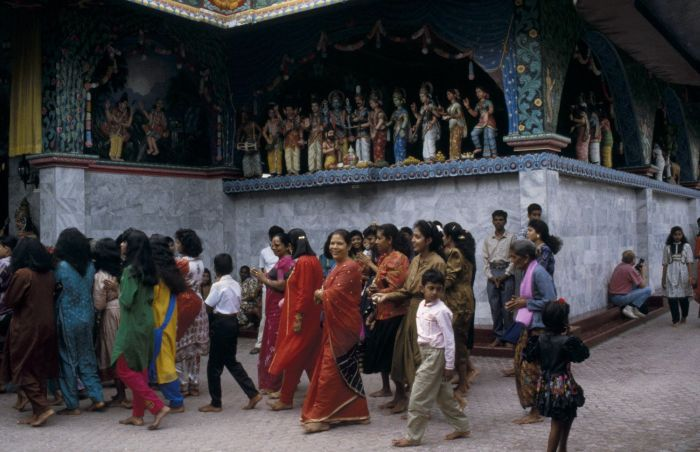
- Indian Indonesian community in Sri Mariamman Temple, Medan, North Sumatra, Indonesia.

Total population
- 7,251 (2025)

Regions with significant populations
- North Sumatra, Aceh, West Sumatra, South Sumatra, Riau, Riau Islands, Jakarta, Bali

Languages
- Mainly: Indonesian (Lingua Franca) • Tamil; Also: · Javanese · Punjabi · Hindustani · Urdu · Minangkabau · Gujarati · Sindhi · Telugu · Sundanese · Balinese · English

Religion
- Predominantly; Hinduism (50%); Significant minorities Islam (20%) • Buddhism (18%) • Christianity (10%); Others; Sikhism (1%) • Jainism (1%)

Related ethnic groups
- People of Indian origin, Malaysian Indians, Tamil Indonesians, Mardijkers, Betawi People

Indian Indonesians are Indonesians whose ancestors originally came from the Indian subcontinent. Therefore, this term can be regarded as a blanket term for not only Indonesian Indians but also Indonesians with other South Asian ancestries (e.g. Pakistanis, Bangladeshis, etc.). According to the Indian Ministry of External Affairs, there were about 120,000 people of Indian origin as well as 9,000 Indian nationals living and working in Indonesia as of January 2012. Most of them were concentrated in the province of North Sumatra and urban areas such as Banda Aceh, Padang, Surabaya, Medan, and Jakarta. However, it is quite impossible to get correct statistical figures on the Indian Indonesian population, because some of them have merged and assimilated with the indigenous population to become indistinguishable from native Indonesians.

The history of Indian presence in the Indonesian archipelago dates back to the late 1st millennium BCE, characterized by a period of Indianization driven by maritime trade and cultural exchange. Archaeological excavations at Sembiran and Pacung in northern Bali have unearthed Indian-style rouletted ware and glass beads dating to approximately 200 BCE, representing some of the earliest physical evidence of South Asian contact.

This interaction facilitated the introduction of Sanskrit, the Pallava script, and Dharmic religions, as evidenced by the 4th-century Yupa inscriptions of King Mulavarman in Kalimantan, which are the earliest known written records in Indonesia. Genetic studies further corroborate these ancient links, identifying Indian genomic markers in modern Indonesian populations—particularly in Bali and Java—consistent with an admixture event occurring roughly 2,000 years ago. This long-standing relationship culminated in the rise of influential maritime empires such as Srivijaya and Majapahit, which synthesized indigenous Austronesian customs with South Asian political and religious frameworks.

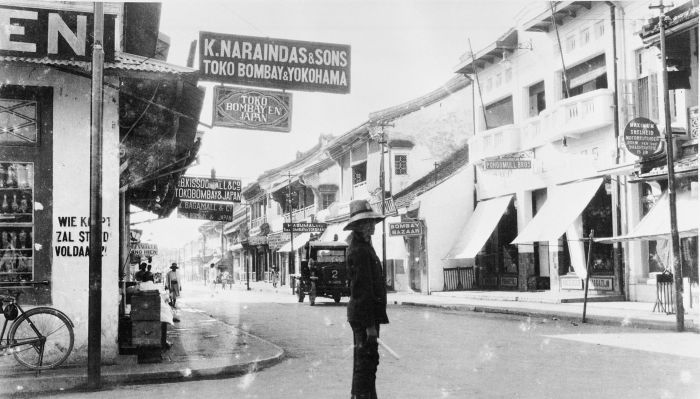
An old Indian enclave in Pasar Baru, Jakarta, Indonesia

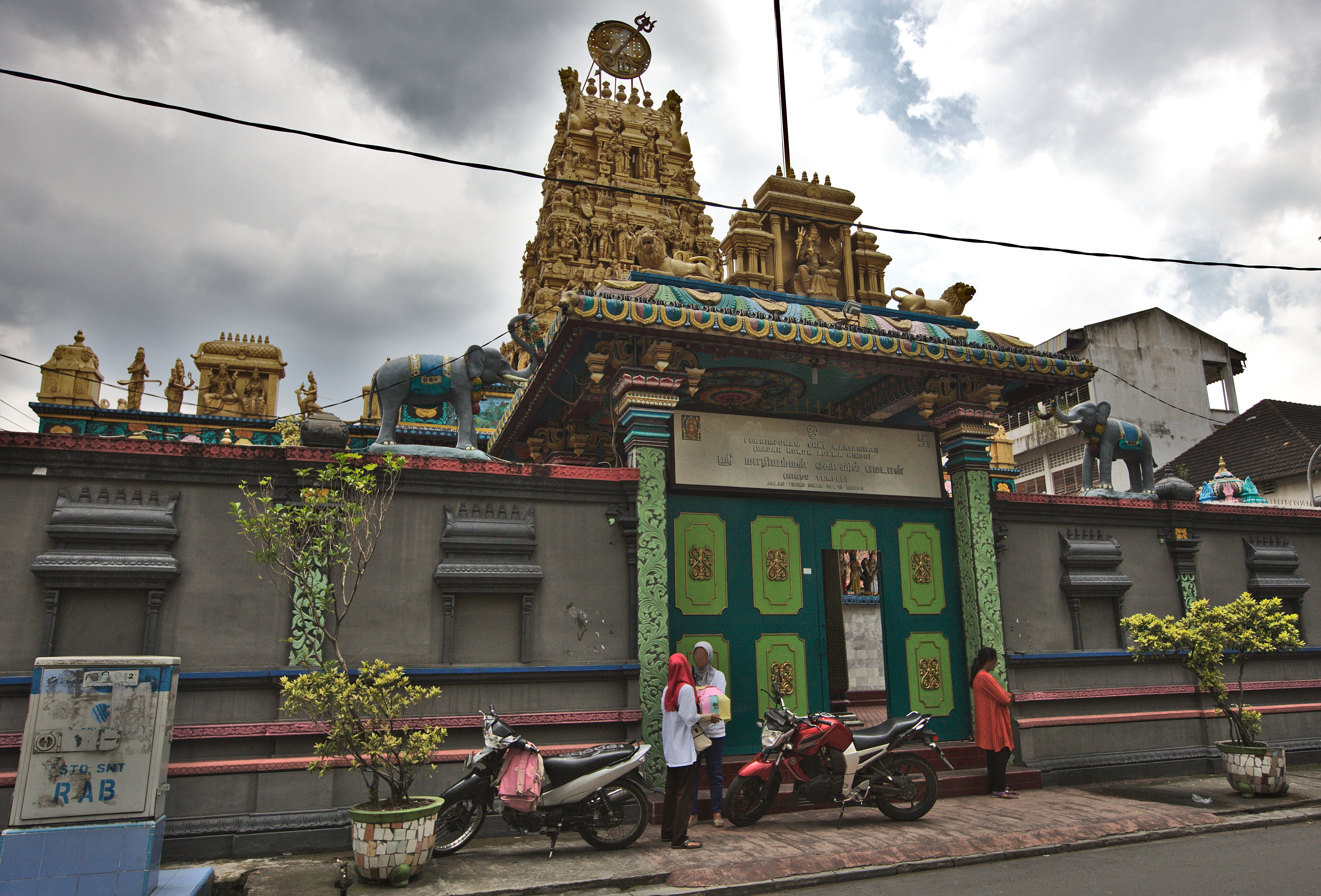
Shri Mariamman Temple in Kampung Madras, Medan, Indonesia

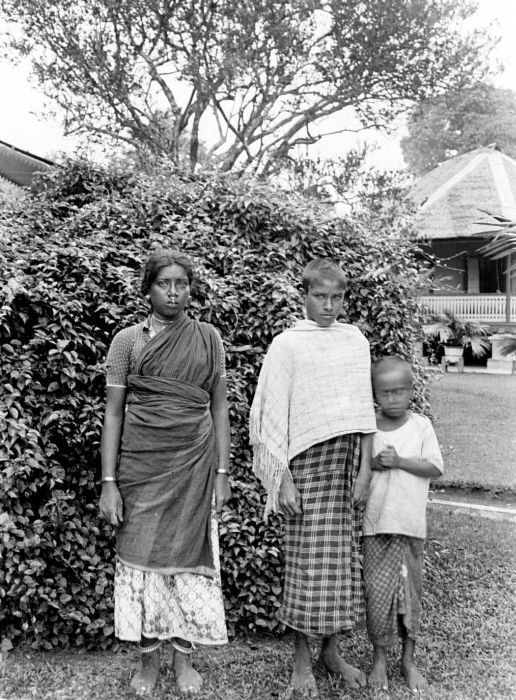
Portrait of an Indian family in Sumatra, 1920s

== History ==
=== Pre-colonial era ===
The name Indonesia itself derives from the Latin Indus, meaning "India", and the Greek nesos, meaning "island". (due to the similarity of the culture in both regions).

The ties between Indonesia and the Indian subcontinent dates back to the times of the Ramayana, where "Yawadvipa" (Java) is mentioned in India's earliest epic, the Ramayana. Sugriva, the chief of Rama's army dispatched his men to Yawadvipa, the island of Java, in search of Sita. Indians had visited Indonesia since ancient times, and ancient Indonesian peoples has embarked in maritime trade in Southeast Asian seas and Indian Ocean. The spread of Hinduism and Buddhism in Indonesia is also pioneered by Indian merchants, scholars, missionaries, priests and traders who settled within the region.

An rouletted ware of South Indian origin at the site of Simberan, Bali has produced a carbon dating of 660 BCE (± 100). Signifying that Indian settlement have reached as far as Bali and The population exchanges and intermarriages in the island of Bali between Indonesians and Indians has been archaeologically dated as far as to second century BCE.

Southern Indians, particularly Tamils, have a long history in Indonesia. After Rajendra Chola I's invasion of Srivijaya in 1024–1025, there was a noticeable increase in Tamil economic activity in Indonesia and Southeast Asia in general. One of direct consequence of Chola invasion was the emergence of Kota Cina, an ancient trading town currently located in northern Medan.

Tamil presence has been recorded in Lobu Tua Inscription dating about 1088 regarding the Five Hundred Lords of Ayyanuruwar, a Tamil merchant guild had trading post in Barus, an ancient port town currently located in Central Tapanuli Regency, North Sumatra. The inscription itself is written in Tamil, and Barus was referred as Varocu by them. The Tamils residing permanently or temporarily in Barus were mainly traders or craftsmen by profession. Some of them migrated westward towards Karoland and Kota Cina, and assimilated with local Karo people. The clan (marga) Sembiring is believed to have a connection with the Tamils. Many of its sub-mergas, like Colia, Berahmana, Pandia, Meliala, Depari, Muham, Pelawi and Tekan, are indicated to be of South Indian origin as well. Some scholars cited that some aspects of Karo tradition are believed to have been influenced from Tamil culture, such as disposing of the dead and urung (village federation, thought to be influenced from medieval Tamil society).

One of the suggested theories of the spread of Islam within the region was the "Gujarat Theory". Just like what the name implies, the theory suggested that the introduction of Islam within the region was due to the efforts of Gujarati Muslim traders and merchants who came and settled within the region, these traders are commonly found in areas the locals referred as "Kampung Pekojan". In Jakarta there are areas named Pekojan in West Jakarta, and Koja in North Jakarta. Both of these areas used to be settlements of Indian Muslims who were also called Khoja. They generally came from Cutch, Kathiawar and many other areas in Gujarat. They mostly came from the Ksatria caste. In the 14th century, this community underwent a major change when a Persian missionary, Pir Sadruddin, spread Islam among them and gave them the name "Khwaja", and from this word the word "khoja" or "koja" was derived. "Khawaja" itself means "teacher, respected and well-off person".

=== Colonial period ===
Large numbers of Tamils from India were brought by the Dutch in the early build-up of the plantation industries across the island of Sumatra in the 1830s.

After they arrived in Indonesia, they were used for hard labor and housed in simple huts. Most of them worked for the Dutch company, Deli Maatschappij under harsh conditions. A small number of Tamils returned to India after their contract expires. At the end of the 1940s, many Tamils got an opportunity to return and left, although a number of them opted to remain within the colony, about 5,000 to 10,000 Tamils remained in North Sumatra alone, mainly in Medan, but also in Lubuk Pakam, Tebing Tinggi, and Binjai.

Many Merchants and traders from various parts of India have also began immigrating to Indonesia around this time, in Batavia, a large number of silk merchants hailing from Mumbai and Calcutta (particularly those who are of Sindhi, Sikh and Punjabi ethnicity) established themselves within Weltevreden district, in an area now known as Pasar Baru.

Sikh settlement and migration within Indonesia is also accelerated around the colonial times, In Sumatra, specifically Aceh in particular, acted as a gateway to Sikh settlement and migration across the Indonesian archipelago. The early Sikh settlers to Sumatra arrived via the Malayan post of Penang, Sikh settlement in Sumatra dates back to the 1870s. In the early years, the Sikh population of Sumatra would have been a few hundred people until the early 1880s, whereafter it was bolstered with fresh numbers by young, male Sikh arrivals from the Straits Settlements. The partial motivation of the large scale Sikh Migration towards Sumatra might've been motivated by tales of Guru Nanak visiting the island.

The early Sikhs who settled in northern Sumatra in the late 19th century originated from the Jalandhar and Amritsar areas of the Majha and Doaba regions of the Punjab. These early Sikh arrivals came as traders and gradually scattered throughout northern Sumatra. Sumatran Sikhs of the time also were engaged in the dairy, security, and taxi industries, later branching out to business, trading, sports equipment manufacturing, and textile sectors later-on. Some of the Sumatran Sikh pioneers worked in tobacco and rubber plantations. By the late 19th century, a Medan branch of the De Javasche Bank was established, with Sikhs working as security guards at it. They would be followed by Sikhs seeking work as watchmen. Stories of Sikh success and opportunities in Sumatra made their way back to the Punjab, which encouraged further Sikh migration to the island by prospective Sikhs. Some of these Sikhs have also came to work as soldiers and policemen.

=== World War II and independence ===
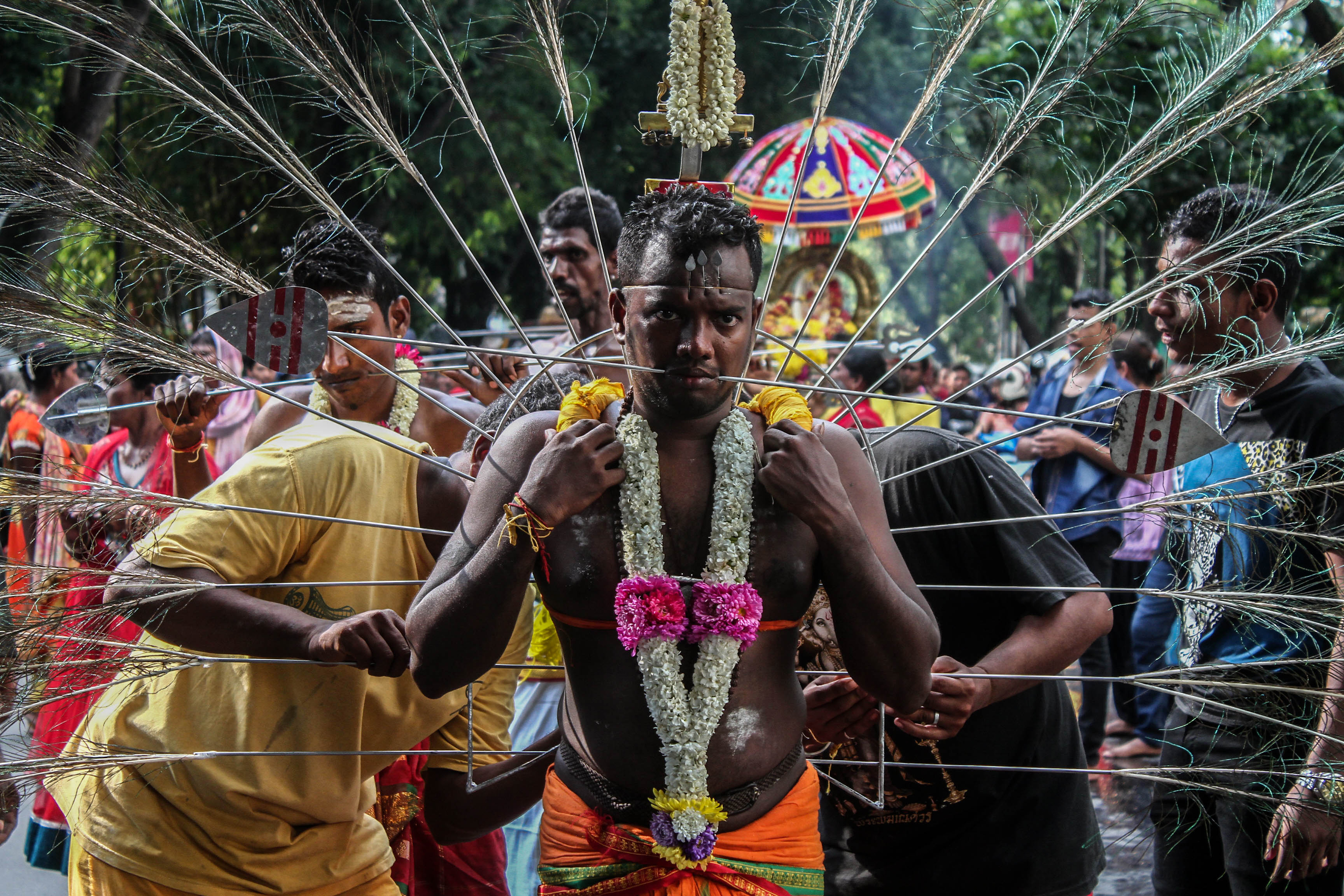
Thaipusam celebration in Medan, 2016. The devotee piercing the skin, tongue or cheeks with Vel as symbol of honoring to the Tamil God of Murugan

After World War II and the country's independence from the Netherlands, many Indians opted to remain within the country, although some have left during several turbulent and unstable periods in the country, with most migrating to the neighboring countries of Malaysia and Singapore due to its close proximity and for economic reasons.

Association communities have also existed across the country. the Tamil community has an organization called Indonesia Tamil Tamram, which works to preserve the Tamil language and culture, build mutual understanding between Indians and Indonesians, and provide learning opportunities for Tamil children in Indonesia to learn their mother tongue.

== List of notable Indonesian Indians ==
Name	Notes
Ayu Azhari	Indonesian actress.
A. Rafiq	Indonesian actor and Dangdut musician
Afifa Syahira	Indonesian film actress
Ahmad Hassan	Ulama, one of the founders and member of PERSIS
Angbeen Rishi	Indonesian film actress
Charles Tambu	Indonesian politician.
Chand Parwez Servia	Movie producer and businessman.
Chelsy Liven	Indonesian model
Dhamoo Punjabi	Cineaste, movie producer and media tycoon, co-founder of MD Entertainment.
Dheeraj Kalwani	Movie producer
D. Kumaraswamy	Indonesian Hindu reformer and Tamil community leader in Indonesia.
Farouk Afero	Indonesian film actor
Fiaz Servia	Movie producer
Gandhi Fernando	Indonesian film actor
Gitty Srinita	Indonesian film actress
Gocah Pahlawan	Founder of the Deli Sultanate and Sultanate of Serdang
Godja Babouw	Former Harbourmaster of Banjarmasin.
Gope T. Samtani	Movie producer and businessman, founder of Rapi Films
Gurnam Singh	Indonesian athlete, won three gold medals in the 1962 Asian Games in athletics.
Hamid Algadri	Politician and independence fighter, BPUPK member.
Harbrinderjit Singh Dillon	Indonesian politician.
Hasan Ali	Artist and language activist
H. B. Naveen	Businessman and movie producer, founder and owner of Falcon Pictures.
James Bharataputra	Indonesian Catholic priest and missionary, founder of the Graha Maria Annai Velangkanni church in Medan.
Jesica Fitriana	Beauty pageant titleholder and activist
Karan Sukarno	Actor and politician.
Kimmy Jayanti	Indonesian model and actress.
Kobalen A.S	Indonesian politician.
Manoj Punjabi	Indonesian cineaste and media tycoon and founder of MD Pictures and MD Entertainment production houses.
Marissa Haque	Actress and politician
Muhammad Nazaruddin	Indonesian politician and businessman.
Musa Rajekshah	Indonesian entrepreneur and politician
Nataraja Ramakrishna	Indonesian dance guru
Nuruddin ar-Raniri	Sultanate of Aceh politician
Leonardo Arya	Indonesian film Actor
Parvez Ghoman	Indonesian film Actor
Raffi Ahmad	Indonesian actor, entrepreneur, film producer and media personality
Raam Punjabi	Indonesian cineaste and media tycoon and founder of the Multivision Plus production house, uncle of Manoj Punjabi.
Rahmat Shah	Indonesian politician and businessman
Raline Shah	Indonesian actress and entrepreneur
Ram Soraya	Indonesian entrepreneur, movie producer and the owner of production house Soraya Intercine Films.
Rocky Soraya	Movie producer and media Tycoon, founder of Hitmaker studios and the current COO of Soraya Intercine Films son of Ram Soraya.
Saira Nisar	Businesswoman
Sarah Azhari	Indonesian actress, model and singer.
Sellen Fernandez	Indonesian film actor
Shahul Hameed	Cricket athlete
Shanker R. S.	Movie producer and businessman.
Sri Prakash Lohia	Indonesian billionaire businessman.
Swami Anand Krishna	Indonesian spiritual humanist.
Tamil Selvan	Political observer and commentator.
Visagan M	Founder of the first major Tamil organization in Indonesia. President of Asian Tamil Sangam.
Vivek Lall	American scientist, chief executive of General Atomics (born in Indonesia)
Wijay	Indonesian football player for PSMS Medan.

== See also ==
- Bali Jatra
- Desi
- Klingalese
- Mardijker people
- Non-resident Indian and Overseas Citizen of India
- Tamil diaspora

== Other sources ==
- J.L.A. Brandes, 1913, Oud-Javaansche oorkonden: nagelaten transscripties van wĳlen J.L.A. Brandes; uitgegeven door N.J. Krom. Batavia: Albrecht. (Old Javanese inscriptions, bequeathed by the late J.L.A. Brandes, edited by N.J. Krom).
- de Vletter, M.E.; Voskuil, R.P.G.A.; van Diessen, J.R. (May 1997). Batavia/Djakarta/Jakarta Beeld van een metamorfose. Purmerend: Asia Maior. ISBN 9074861091.
- Jan Gonda, 1952, Sanskrit in Indonesia. New Delhi: International Academy of Indian Culture.
- Page of the Indian Embassy in Jakarta on Indonesia
- Nilay Kothari
- There has never been Indian Kings whose expansion in the South-east Asia known to be of a Sanskrit Speaking. The Raja-raja Chera, Chola, Pandia and the rest of the Kings whose ruler-ship established in this part of the world are of the South Indian Kings.
