= Punjabi diaspora =

Ethnic Punjabis and their descendants living outside of India and Pakistan

ਪਰਦੇਸੀ ਪੰਜਾਬੀ; پردیسی پنجابی; Pardēsī Panjābī
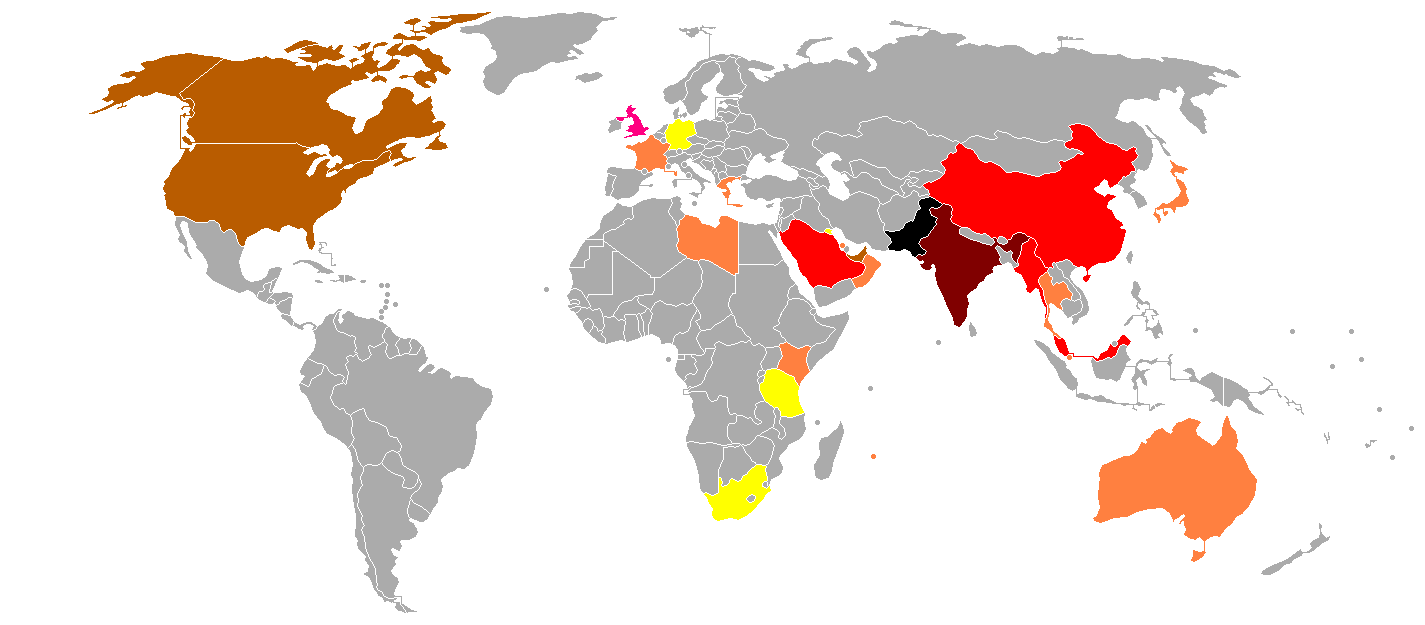
- Map of Punjabis around the world

Total population
- 2–2.5 million.

Regions with significant populations
- Canada: 942,170 (2021) (Note: Statistic includes all speakers of the Punjabi language, as many multi-generation individuals do not speak the language as a mother tongue, but instead as a second or third language.)
- United Kingdom: 700,000 (2006)
- United States: 253,740
- Australia: 239,033 (2021)
- Italy: 200,000 (2019)
- Malaysia: 56,400 (2019)
- Philippines: 50,000 (2016)
- Indonesia: 35,000 (2019)
- New Zealand: 34,227 (2018)
- Sweden: 24,000 (2013)
- Bangladesh: 23,700 (2019)
- Germany: 18,000 (2020)
- Nepal: 10,000 (2019)

Languages
- Punjabi • Hindi-Urdu • English • others

Religion
- Islam • Sikhism (incl. Nanakpanthi) • Hinduism • Christianity

Related ethnic groups
- Indian diaspora, Pakistani diaspora, South Asian diaspora

The Punjabi diaspora (Punjabi: Pardēsī Panjābī) consists of the descendants of ethnic Punjabis who emigrated out of the Punjab region in Pakistan and India to the rest of the world. Punjabis are one of the largest ethnic groups in both the Pakistani and Indian diasporas. The Punjabi diaspora around the world numbers between 3 and 5 million, mainly concentrated in Britain, Canada, the United States, Western Europe, Southeast Asia, the Middle East, Australia and New Zealand.

== History ==
During the mediaeval period, Punjabis (mostly merchants) settled in other parts of South Asia, from Assam, Tamil country, Kashmir, Sindh, to Balkh. The colonial-era allowed for further migration overseas to countries, with diasporic communities being rooted in Australia, New Zealand, Hong Kong, Singapore, Thailand, Iran, Kenya, England, Canada, and the United States.

== Australia ==
Percentage of people in each Australian Bureau of Statistics (ABS) statistical area 1 (SA1) in the coastal New South Wales town of Woolgoolga and nearby Sandy Beach and Safety Beach who reported speaking Punjabi at home in the 2021 census. 0–5% 5–10% 10–15% 15–20% 20–25% 25–30% 30–35% 35–40%

== Bangladesh ==
Many families from Punjab, Pakistan migrated to erstwhile East Pakistan (present-day Bangladesh) as it was one country at the time. Some of these families chose to remain in Bangladesh after its independence. One such example is the family of Bangladeshi-Punjabi cricketer Junaid Siddique.

== Brazil ==
Most Punjabis in Brazil are Sikhs.

Punjabis migrated to Australia from other parts of the Punjabi diaspora, as well from the state of Punjab itself. The majority were Sikh and Hindu Punjabis are a.

== Canada ==
Punjabis make up approximately 2.6% of the Canadian population as per the 2021 Canadian Census. The largest Punjabi community in Canada is in Ontario, with 397,867 Punjabis as of 2021 (making up 2.84% of the overall population), while British Columbia is home to approximately 315,000 Punjabis (making up 6.41% of the overall population). 85% of South Asians in British Columbia are Punjabi Sikhs, including former premier of British Columbia, Ujjal Dosanjh and former leader of the federal New Democratic Party (NDP), MP for Burnaby South, Jagmeet Singh.

Punjabi Canadians by province and territory (1991−2021)
Province/territory	2021		2016		2011		2006		2001		1996		1991	
Province/territory	Pop.	%	Pop.	%	Pop.	%	Pop.	%	Pop.	%	Pop.	%	Pop.	%
Ontario	397,865	2.84%	282,065	2.13%	238,130	1.87%	201,720	1.68%	146,250	1.3%	99,135	0.93%	64,105	0.64%
British; Columbia	315,000	6.41%	244,485	5.36%	213,315	4.9%	184,590	4.53%	142,785	3.69%	112,365	3.05%	77,830	2.4%
Alberta	126,385	3.03%	90,485	2.27%	62,815	1.74%	44,480	1.37%	28,460	0.97%	20,660	0.77%	15,165	0.6%
Manitoba	42,820	3.28%	22,900	1.85%	12,555	1.05%	7,600	0.67%	6,305	0.57%	5,445	0.49%	4,150	0.38%
Quebec	34,290	0.41%	17,860	0.22%	14,480	0.19%	15,435	0.21%	13,050	0.18%	9,155	0.13%	4,850	0.07%
Saskatchewan	13,310	1.21%	8,300	0.78%	3,250	0.32%	1,210	0.13%	925	0.1%	760	0.08%	635	0.07%
Nova; Scotia	6,730	0.7%	1,010	0.11%	800	0.09%	625	0.07%	525	0.06%	765	0.09%	705	0.08%
New; Brunswick	2,475	0.33%	205	0.03%	115	0.02%	130	0.02%	135	0.02%	80	0.01%	55	0.01%
Prince Edward; Island	1,550	1.03%	185	0.13%	40	0.03%	15	0.01%	0	0%	30	0.02%	90	0.07%
Newfoundland and Labrador	1,040	0.21%	485	0.09%	115	0.02%	150	0.03%	150	0.03%	140	0.03%	235	0.04%
Yukon	490	1.24%	150	0.43%	105	0.31%	100	0.33%	90	0.32%	95	0.31%	50	0.18%
Northwest; Territories	175	0.43%	105	0.26%	30	0.07%	25	0.06%	35	0.09%	60	0.09%	65	0.11%
Nunavut	30	0.08%	15	0.04%	15	0.05%	10	0.03%	10	0.04%	N/A	N/A	N/A	N/A
Canada	942,170	2.59%	668,240	1.94%	545,730	1.65%	456,090	1.46%	338,715	1.14%	248,695	0.87%	167,930	0.62%

== Georgia ==
In 2012, around 2,000 farmers from Punjab, India migrated to Georgia to farm. As of 2018 about 200 of them are still living in Tsnori, a town in Kakheti region.

== Germany ==
The Punjabi Sikh diaspora in Germany is around 15,000-21,000.

== Greece ==
The first arrival of Punjabis in Greece came through the British Indian Army during World War I and World War II. Since the 1990s, many Sikh migrants from Punjab came to Greece to work on shipping lines, in agriculture, construction, and as taxi drivers. During the 2015 European migrant crisis, many immigrants including Punjabis illegally entered Greece.

== Indonesia ==
Punjabis are the second largest Indian group in Indonesia, right after Tamil people, some of them are known as film producer, politician and athlete such as Manoj Punjabi, H. S. Dillon, Gurnam Singh, Ayu Azhari, and Musa Rajekshah. Punjabis in Indonesia adheres primarily to Sikhism, Hinduism and Islam, according to some source, the population of ethnic Punjabis are estimated to be around 35,000 to 60,000.

== Hong Kong ==
Among Hong Kong Indian adolescents, Punjabi is the third most common language after English and Cantonese. The Punjabis were influential in the military, and in line with the British military thinking of the time (namely, the late 19th century and early 20th century) Punjabi Sikhs, Punjabi Hindus and Punjabi Muslims formed two separate regiments. The regiments were as follows:

- Punjab regiment: 25,000 soldiers (50% Muslim, 40% Hindu and 10% Sikh)
- Sikh Regiment: 10,000 soldiers (80% Sikh, 20% Hindu)

In 1939, Hong Kong's police force included 272 Europeans, 774 Indians (mainly Punjabis) and 1140 Chinese. Punjabis dominated Hong Kong's police force until the 1950s.

From the 2006 government by-census results, it shows a population of roughly 20,444 Indians and roughly 11,111 Pakistanis residing at the former British territory.

== Iran ==
Around 60 Punjabi Sikh families reside in Iran. The Punjabi language is also taught at Kendriya Vidyalaya Tehran, an Indian co-educational school in Baharestan District, Tehran.

== Italy ==
The Punjabi Sikh diaspora in Italy is a growing minority in Italy. The country has the second biggest Sikh population in Europe after the United Kingdom. It is estimated that there are more than 200,000 Sikhs in Italy.

== Japan ==
There are 71,000 Punjabis. In Japan 98% of the Punjabis are Sikh and 1.5% of the Punjabis are Christian.

== Kenya ==
Most Kenyan Asians are Gujaratis, but the second largest group are Punjabis. All three major religious groups (Sikh, Muslim and Hindu) are represented in the Punjabi population. The artisan Ramgharia caste used to be the largest group amongst the Sikhs.

== Malaysia ==
Although most Malaysian Indians are Tamils, there were also many Punjabis that immigrated to Malaysia. They are known to be the third largest Indian ethnic group in Malaysia, after the Tamils and Malayalees. According to Amarjit Kaur as of 1993 there were 60, 000 Punjabis in Malaysia. Robin Cohen estimates the number of Malaysian Sikhs as 30, 000 (as of 1995). Recent figures state that there are 130,000 Sikhs in Malaysia.

== New Zealand ==
In New Zealand, Punjabis are one of the largest group of Indian New Zealanders.

== Persian Gulf states ==
In the Gulf states, the largest group among Pakistani expatriates are the Punjabis.

== Philippines ==
The Philippines has over 50,000 Punjabi Indians as recently as the year 2016, not including illegal Punjabi Indian immigrants. This makes the Philippines having the 6th highest population of Punjabi Indians in the world.

== Singapore ==
The third largest group among Indo-Singaporeans in 1980 were Punjabis (after Tamils - who form a majority of Indo-Singaporeans - and Malayalis), at 7.8% of the Indo-Singaporean population.

== Spain ==
Between the 1980s and the 1990s, many Punjabis migrated to Spain due to relaxed immigration policies and a labour shortage. Many consisted of Sikh agricultural and manufacturing labourers, as well as business owners.

== Thailand ==
Most Indians in Thailand are Punjabis.

== Trinidad and Tobago ==
The Sikh community in Trinidad and Tobago, numbering at about 300, consists of the descendants of the few Punjabis who came during the indentureship period and Punjabi Sikhs who came in the twentieth and twenty-first century. The Sikhs have a gurdwara in Tunapuna dating back to 1929. There were also Punjabi Hindus and Punjabi Muslims who came during the indentured period as well in the twentieth and twenty-first century. Bhangra has also had a minor impact on the local Indian Bhojpuri-derived chutney music, with few songs mixing bhangra rhythms to create a chutney bhangra style.

The founder of Solo Beverage Company, one of the largest beverage companies in Trinidad and Tobago, Serjad Makmadeen (a.k.a. Joseph Charles), was born in 1910 in Princes Town to Makmadeen, a Punjabi Muslim who emigrated from Punjab in then British India to Trinidad, and his wife Rosalin Jamaria, a Dougla (mixed Indian and African heritage) who emigrated from Martinique. One of the most notorious gangster and pirate of the twentieth century in Trinidad and Tobago and the wider Caribbean, Boysie Singh was born in Woodbrook, Port of Spain in 1908 to a Punjabi Hindu father who immigrated as a fugitive to Trinidad to escape persecution in British India. Ranjit Kumar, one of the founding fathers of Trinidad and Tobago, a "Moulder of the Nation", and an Indo-Trinidadian and Tobagonian civil rights activist, was born in 1912 in Rawalpindi, Punjab, British India (present-day Punjab, Pakistan) to a Punjabi Hindu family. He immigrated to Trinidad and Tobago in 1935 to distribute the first Indian films there and later became an engineer in the Trinidad and Tobago Works Department, where he was responsible for constructing numerous major roads and irrigation and drainage systems. He was also an alderman on the Port of Spain City Council and the founder of the Challenger newspaper, educating the public on engineering, irrigation and flooding problems.

== United Kingdom ==
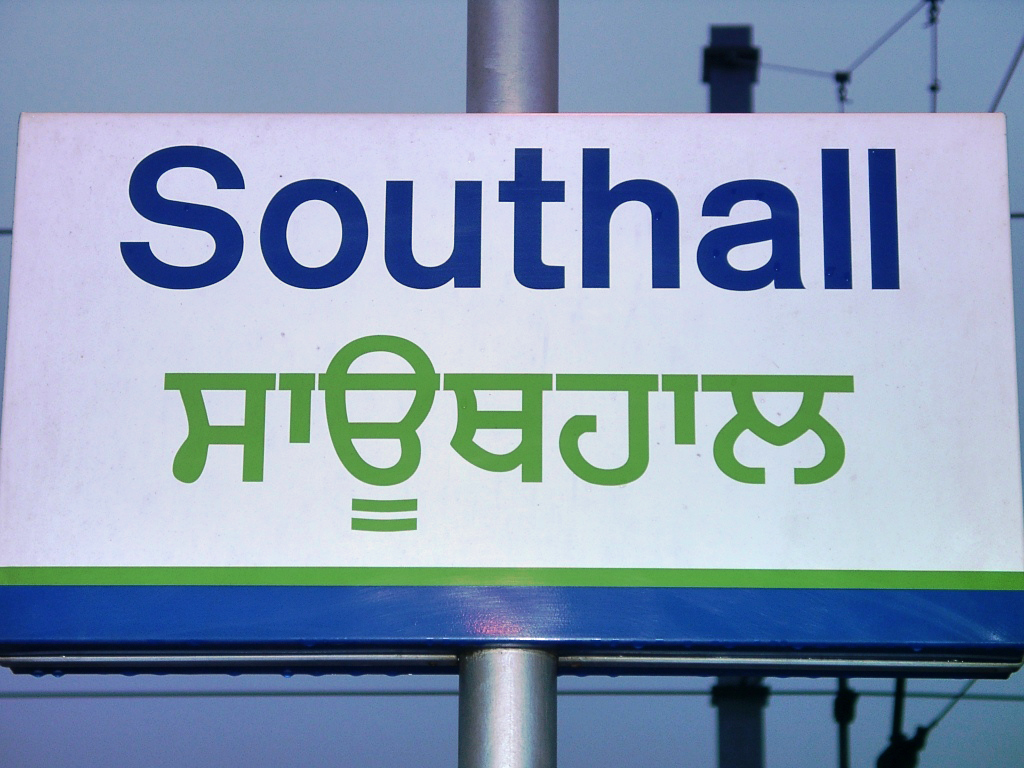
Sign at Southall railway station written in Latin script and Gurmukhi, the script of Punjabi language

In the United Kingdom, around two-thirds of direct migrants from South Asia were Punjabi. The remaining third is mostly Gujarati and Bengali. They form a majority of both the South Asian British Sikh and Hindu communities.

Most "twice-migrants" - a term describing South Asian descendants who migrated to the United Kingdom not directly from South Asia (mainly from the Indian diaspora in Southeast Africa and other British Colonies) were also Punjabi or Gujarati.

United Kingdom is also known as the birthplace of bhangra music, a style of non traditional Punjabi music created by the Punjabi diaspora.

== United States ==
Punjabis in the US by state

The earliest South Asian immigrants to the United States were Punjabis, who mostly immigrated to the West Coast, particularly California. Half of Pakistani Americans are Punjabis. 85% of the early Indian immigrants to the US were Sikhs, although they were incorrectly branded by White Americans as "Hindus". 90% of Indians who settled in the Central Valley of California were Punjabi Sikhs. The first Asian American and member of a non-Abrahamic faith elected to the US Congress was Dalip Singh Saund, a Punjabi Sikh.

== See also ==
- Sikh diaspora
- Romani people
