= Sikhism in Brunei =

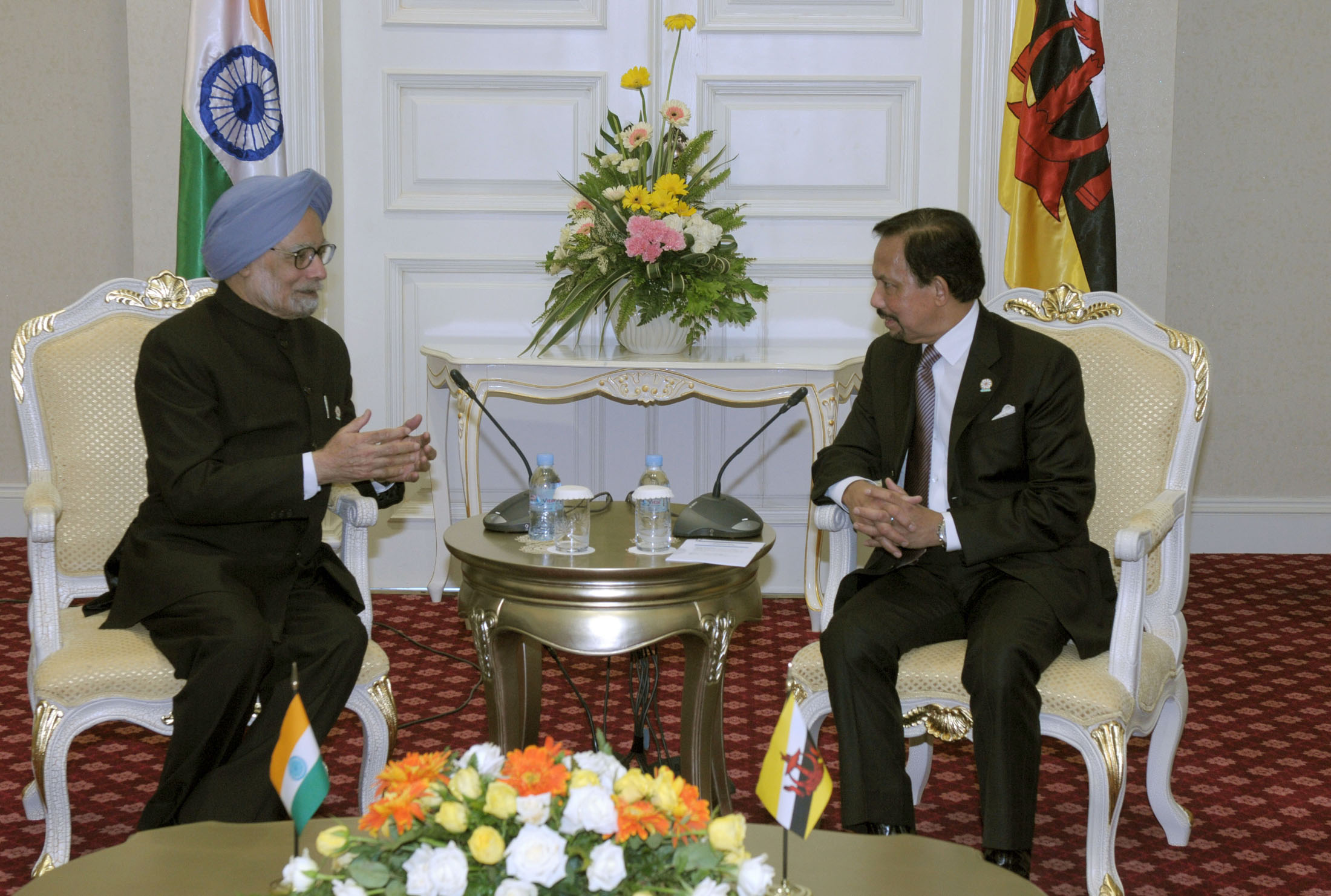
- The first Sikh Prime Minister of India, Dr Manmohan Singh meeting with the Sultan Brunei, Hassanal Bolkiah in Cambodia (2012)

Total population
- 500

Religions
- Sikhism

Languages
- English • Punjabi • Malay

Sikhs are a religious minority in Brunei. There is estimated to be no more than 500 Sikhs living in Brunei, with most residing in Bandar Seri Begawan on the island of Borneo.

== History ==
Most Sikhs in Brunei are within the business sector. They specialise in sport goods, textiles, ready-made garments and carpets. The rest are drivers, doctors, teachers and engineers. Most Sikhs in Brunei are closely connected with the Malaysian Sikh community.

In 2010, Mohinder Singh Bhullar, a Sikh Brunei citizen was awarded the Pravasi Bharatiya Samman award for community service.

In 2013, Dr Manmohan Singh, the first Sikh Prime Minister of India met with the Sultan of Brunei, Hassanal Bolkiah at the ASEAN Summit in Bandar Seri Begawan, Brunei.

== Demographics ==
- In 1993, there were estimated to be 32 Sikh families.
- In 2010, there was estimated to be 500 Sikhs living in Brunei.

== Gurdwara ==
There is currently no Sikh Gurdwara in Brunei, despite lobbying from the Sikh community to have one.

== See also ==
- Sikhism by Country
- Sikhism in Indonesia
- Sikhism in Malaysia
- Sikhism in Singapore
- Religion in Brunei
- Indians in Brunei
