= Academy of the Punjab in North America =

- Abbreviation: APNA
- Type: Non-profit cultural organization
- Purpose: Promotion of Punjabi language, literature, history and culture; digital archiving
- Headquarters: North America
- Region served: Worldwide
- Website: https://apnaorg.com/

Academy of the Punjab in North America (commonly abbreviated APNA) is a non-profit cultural organization that promotes Punjabi language, literature and cultural heritage, and maintains a large open-access digital repository of Punjabi books, articles and music. APNA has been discussed in academic literature and covered by major South Asian newspapers for its role in Punjabi cyberspace and diaspora cultural activities.

== History and mission ==
APNA was established as part of Punjabi diaspora efforts to preserve and disseminate Punjabi literature and cultural materials electronically and through events in North America. Scholars have cited APNA as an example of a diasporic institution that forges cross-border Punjabi cultural ties and encourages bilingual/multi-script publishing (Shahmukhi and Gurmukhi).

== Activities and publications ==
APNA operates an online portal that offers digitized books, articles, and other resources related to Punjab's history, literature and music; it has also published and distributed translated and transliterated Punjabi works. Major English-language and Urdu/Punjabi media have reported on APNA's digital archive and publishing activities. APNA has also organized and hosted conferences, literary events and Punjabi cultural programs across North America and in Pakistan and India; one frequently cited event is APNA's Punjabi conference at Harvard University in April 2002.

== Notable affiliates ==
Several Punjabi scholars and activists associated with diaspora literary activity have been described in media profiles as APNA founders or coordinators; for example Safir H. Rammah is noted in press and organizational profiles as a founding member and a coordinator of APNA.

== Reception and academic commentary ==
Academic sources analyzing Punjabi digital culture and diaspora networks reference APNA as a significant online hub contributing to the construction of a global Punjabi identity and the circulation of literary texts in multiple scripts.

== Media coverage ==
APNA's launch of an expanded website and its archive has been reported by mainstream South Asian press, including The Indian Express and The News (The News on Sunday), which highlighted APNA's role in online access to Punjabi texts.
