= Osing =

Osing may refer to:

- Osing people
- Osing language
