= Swami Anand Krishna =

Indonesian writer

Anand Krishna
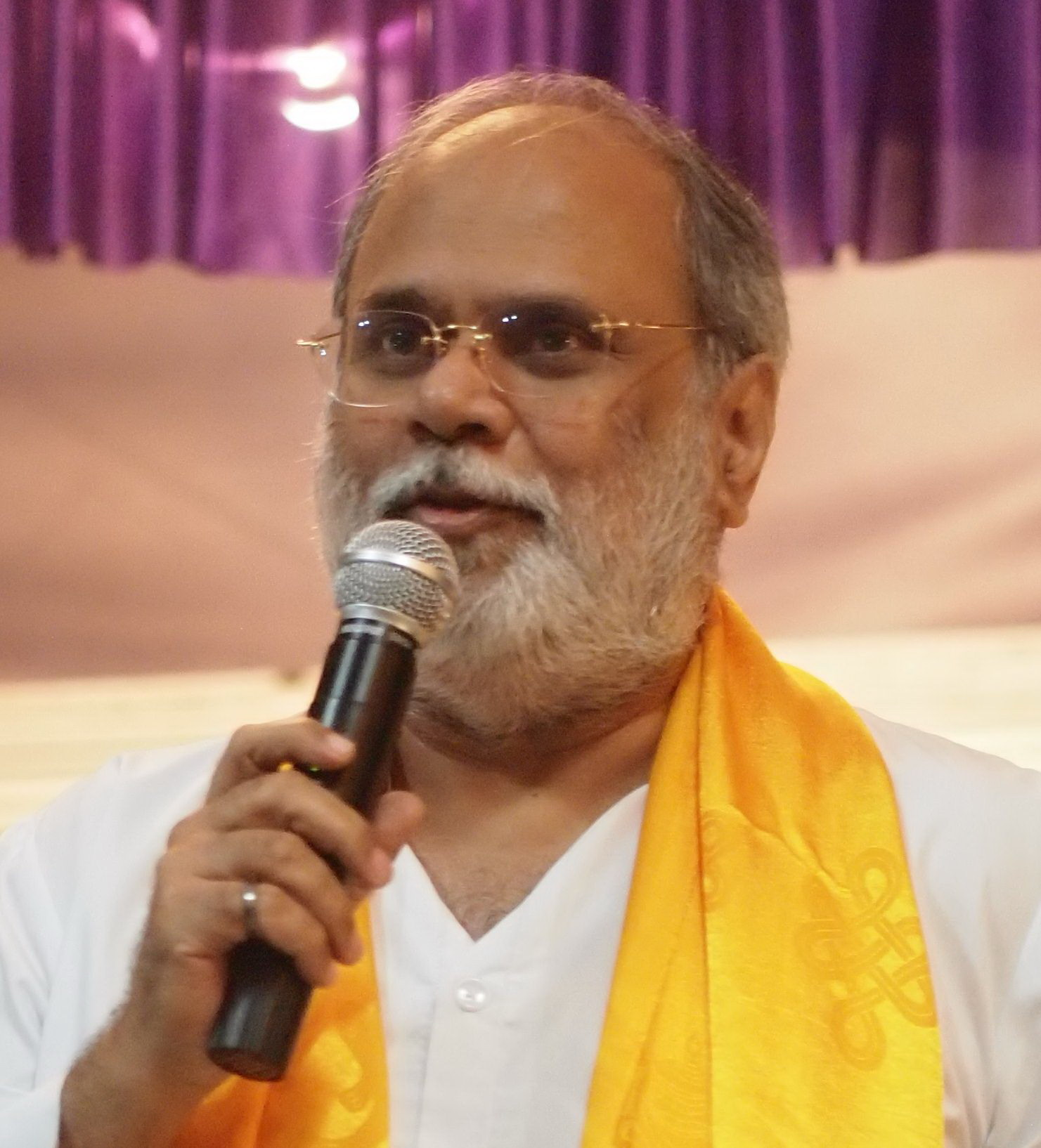
- Anand Krishna of Indonesia
- Born: Krishna Kumar Tolaram Gangtani; 1 September 1956 (age 69); Solo, Central Java, Indonesia
- Works: Over 200 books in Indonesian and English
- Movement: Self-Empowerment, Culture

Anand Krishna (September 1, 1956 - February 6, 2025) was an Indonesian spiritual humanist of ethnic Indian origin and Sindhi descent, who lived in Ubud, Bali. A prolific author and promoter of inter-faith harmony, he was accused of blasphemy by militant Muslim groups after he criticized Islamic conservatives seeking to transform Indonesia into an Islamic state.

He has founded numerous humanitarian initiatives and spiritual establishments, such as the Anand Ashram Foundation and Anand Krishna Centres since 15 December 2006, as well as a Center for Wellbeing and Self-Empowerment in 1991. He promotes a concept of love being the only solution to resolving global problems.

== Early life, education, and business career ==
Anand Krishna was born Khrisna Kumar Tolaram Gangtani in Solo, Central Java, on 1 September 1956. He was educated in Lucknow, North India, where he met his first spiritual mentor, Sheikh Baba, who was an ice vendor. Anand had already learned Sufi poetry and the teachings of Shah Abdul Latief of Sindh, from his father, Tolaram.

Anand's biodata in several of his books states that he earned his master's degree from "a reputable university". However, Indonesian media reports note that he received his master's degree from Pacific Southern University, a blacklisted and unaccredited university.

In 1999, Anand received a Cultural Doctorate in Sacred Philosophy from the now-defunct The World University in Benson, Arizona. In 2012, he received a Ph.D. in Comparative Religions from the University of Sedona.

According to his biodata, Anand was the director and shareholder of a garment factory in Indonesia when he suffered leukemia in 1991 at age 35. He reportedly recovered after meetings with a Tibetan lama in the Himalayas and thereafter decided to devote his life to healing, peace, love and joy.

== Spiritualism career ==
Anand shared his personal experiences on the basis of "Be Joyful and Share your Joy to Others".

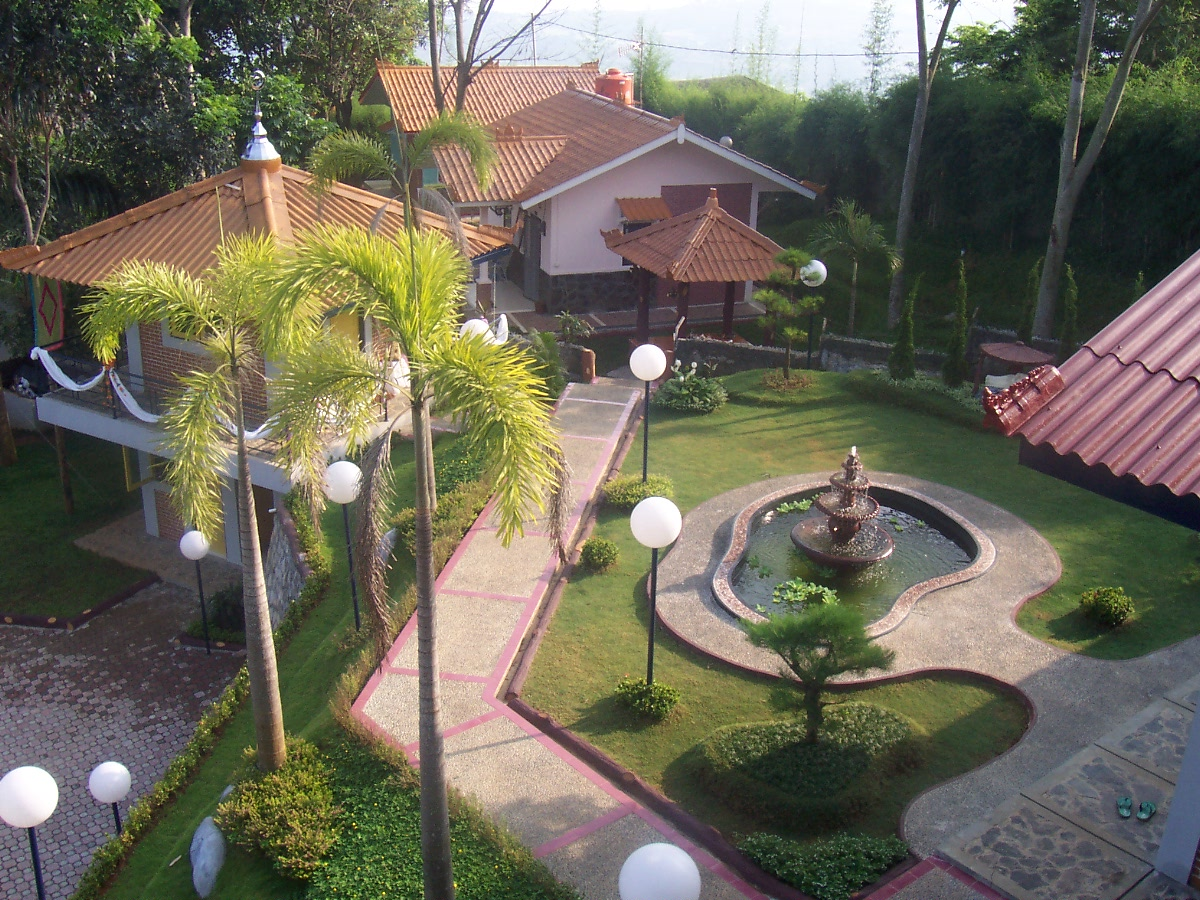
One Earth Meditation Retreat Centre, Ciawi, Indonesia

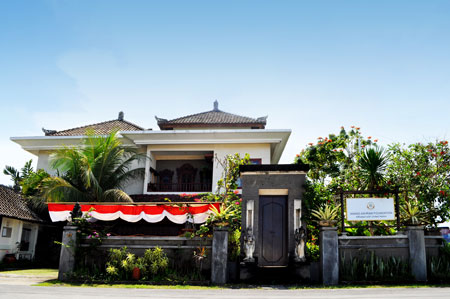
Ashram Centre, Kuta, Bali

He has promoted his teachings through print and electronic media, training seminars, as well as meetings and workshops held at the syncretistic neo-Hindu "Anand Ashram: Center for Holistic Health and Meditation", One Earth Retreat Center in Ciawi, Anand Krishna Center and Ashram@Ubud, and at four meditation centers in Jakarta, Bogor, Yogyakarta and Bali. His ashram foundation is (affiliated to the United Nations Department of Public Information).

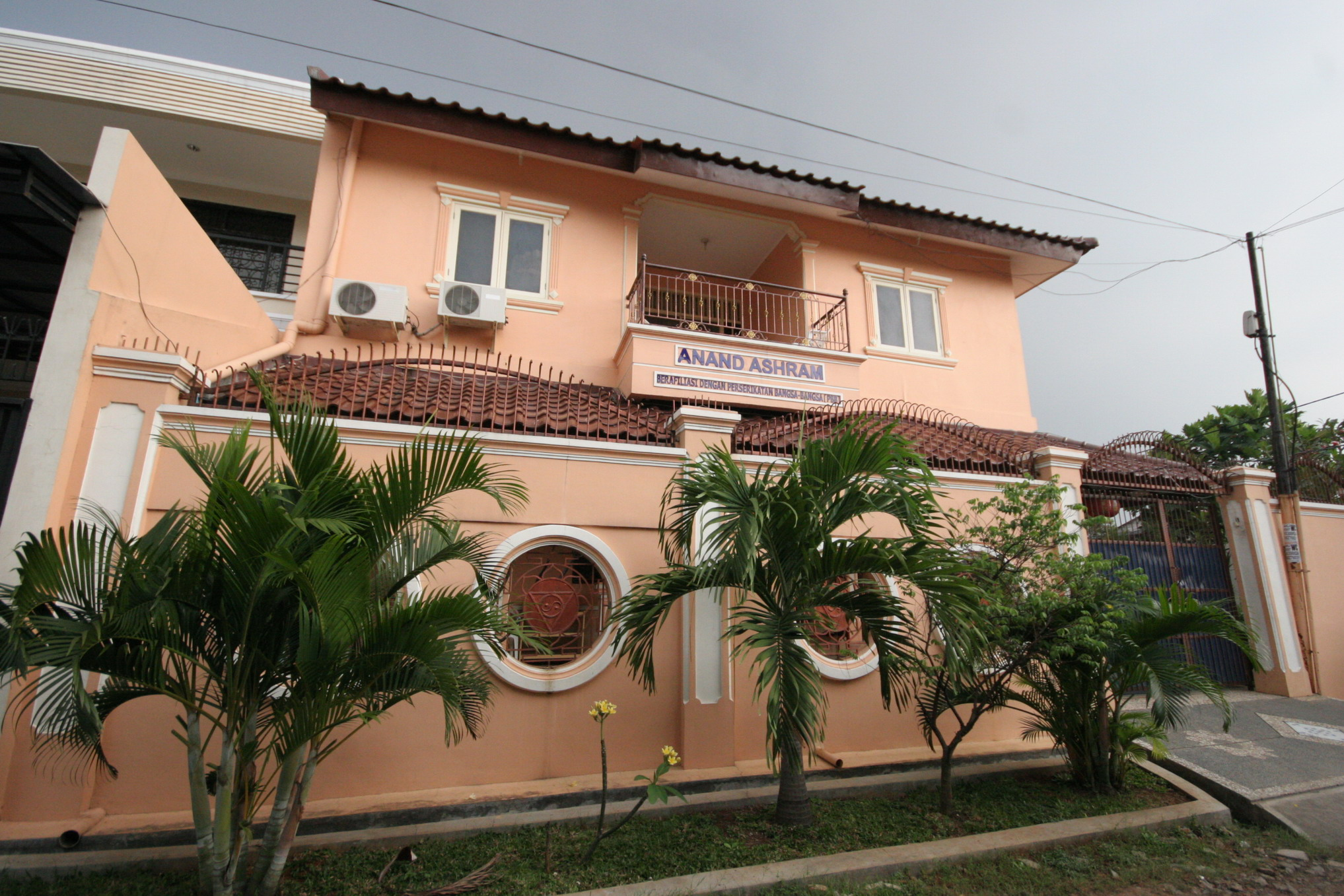
Anand Ashram at Sunter - Jakarta, Indonesia Centre for Wellbeing and Self-Empowerment

He has written columns for Indonesian media publications and also appeared on Indonesian television and radio shows in Bali. In Jakarta, he was the subject of a 13-episode television serial called Building Indonesia Anew with Anand Krishna, broadcast on Q Channel (now BeritaSatu) and Swara networks. A follow-up series was made, called Building The World Anew with Anand Krishna. Guests on the shows included fourth Indonesian president Abdurrahman Wahid; senior police detective Mangku Pastika; the Sultan of Yogyakarta; an Australian ambassador to Indonesia; as well as various politicians and celebrities.

Anand has authored 170 books over 18 years with more than half a million copies sold in Indonesia. He has also promoted meditation across the Indonesian archipelago. One of his three books in English, Voice of Indonesia was discussed on a University of California campus radio show.

In 1997, he was made Reverend Minister by the Universal Life Church. In 2010, he was named Ambassador for Peace by the Universal Peace Federation. In 2011, he joined the International Metaphysical Ministry.

=== Humanitarian initiatives ===
Anand has promoted several movements and Centers for Self Development, among others:

1. International Bali Meditators’ Festival (IBMF)
2. Forum for Revival of Human Spirit – which has given free Self Development Programs to more than 25,000 teachers within last 5 years.
3. Anand Krishna Centres in many major cities, and L’Ayurveda Healing Centers in Jakarta and Bali.
4. AK Global Co-Operation, a national co-operative society with branches in several cities.
5. The National Integration Movement, with almost 30 branches all over Indonesia and overseas representation, including one in the Middle East
6. California Bali Friendship Association
7. Brazil Indonesia Friendship Association
8. Secret Garden of The Mother Divine, Dedicated to Healing Mother Earth and All Her Children, located in Kuta (Bali)
9. AK Education Foundation, First Interfaith School in Bali, for which land has been acquired (about 2,500 sq meters in the prime area of Kuta)
10. Bali Dvipa Charitable Clinic in Bali
11. One Earth Integral Education Foundation
12. Regular Free Medical and Trauma Relief Camps
13. Global Harmony Monument in Ashram@Ubud – Bali
14. The Charter for Global Harmony

== Sexual harassment conviction and blasphemy accusations ==
Anand's promotion of inter-faith harmony and his stance as a Universalist resulted in criticism from Islamic radicals. In 2000, his books were deemed heretical and recalled from Indonesian bookstores.

In 2010, some of his former students accused him of sexual harassment. The main accuser's lawyer, Agung Mattauch, stated: "Harassment is just an entry point for a more serious problem, religious blasphemy".

He was tried at South Jakarta District Court, which acquitted him in November 2011. The Supreme Court overturned the verdict in August 2012 and gave him a two-and-a-half-year jail term for sexually harassing three of his students. He was arrested at his residence in Ubud in February 2013 and sent to Cipinang jail in East Jakarta to serve his sentence. The Supreme Court in January 2014 announced it had rejected his request for a judicial review.

Professor Julia D. Howell of the Centre for the Study of Contemporary Muslim Societies at Western Sydney University noted that since the Indonesian Council of Ulama had pronounced a series of fatwa against pluralism and liberalism in religion in 2005, religious pluralists such as Anand had been criticized in the Indonesian mass media.

In January 2018, Jonaedi Efendi released a book, Reconstructing the Foundation of Justice's Considerations based on Principles of Laws and Social Justice Observed and Lived in Society (Rekonstruksi Dasar Pertimbangan Hakim Berdasarkan Nilai-Nilai Hukum dan Rasa Keadilan yang Hidup dalam Masyarakat), which viewed the Supreme Court's conviction of Anand as "misguided justice".

== International speaking career ==
=== Conference on Sufi Movements in Contemporary Islam ===
After attending the 60th Annual DPI/NGO Conference on "Climate Change: How It Impacts Us All" in September 2007, Anand Krisha was invited to present his paper on Sufi Solutions to World’s Problems at a conference held by the National University of Singapore and Institute of Southeast Asian Studies, over 4–5 August 2008

=== Ubud Writers & Readers Festival 2008 ===
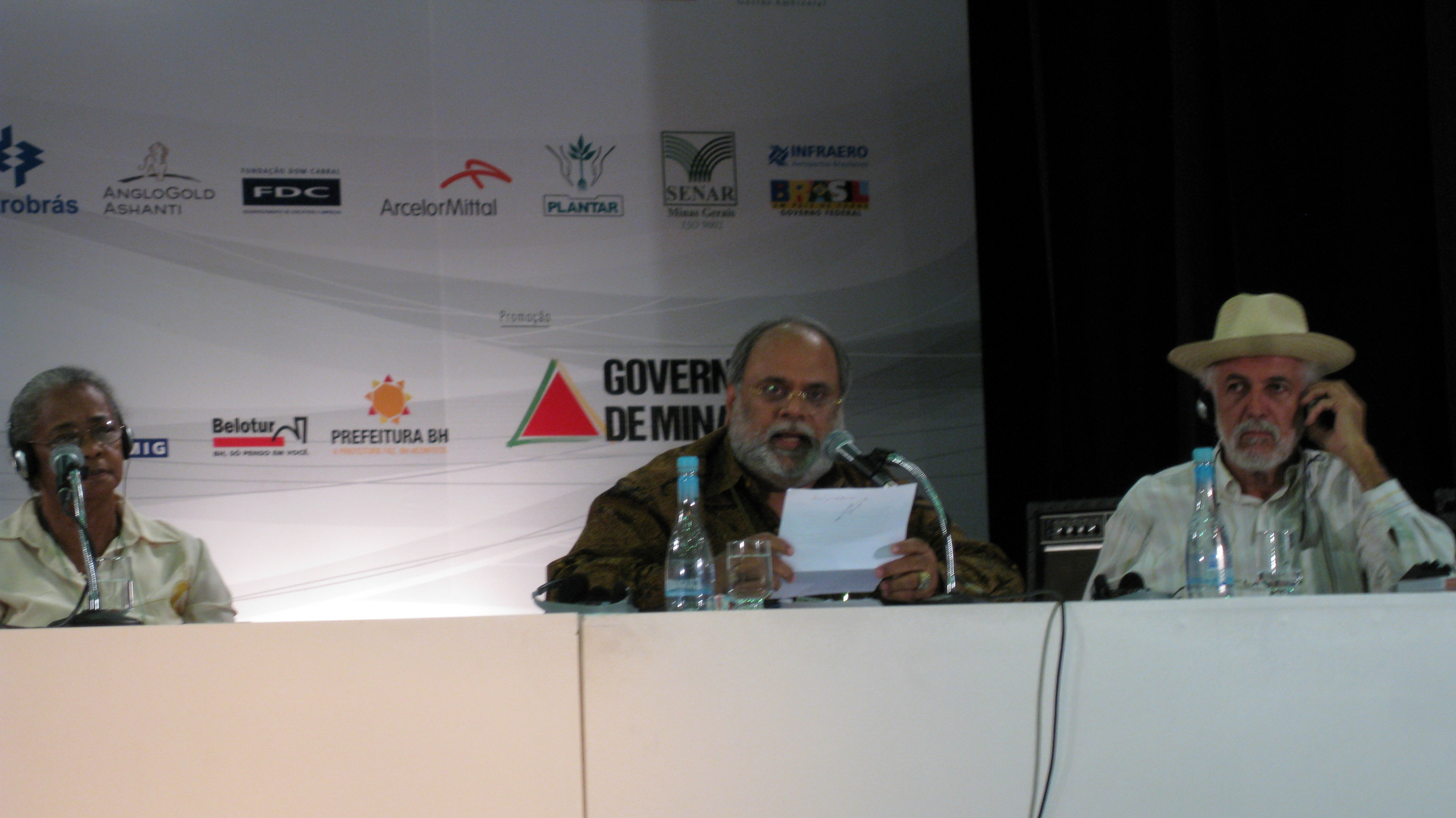
Earth Dialoques on Water Planet, November 2008

=== Earth Dialogues on Water Planet 2008 ===
Anand spoke at Earth Dialogues on Water Planet (Dialogos da Terra no Planeta Aqua) hosted by the government of Minas Gerais and Green Cross International in Belo Horizonte, Brazil on 26–28 November 2008. Anand presented his paper on Water of Life, Wisdom of the Ancient – In Pursuit of the Indigenous Wisdom of Sundaland and South America to Save Our Planet. His paper was published as a book with the same title in 2009.

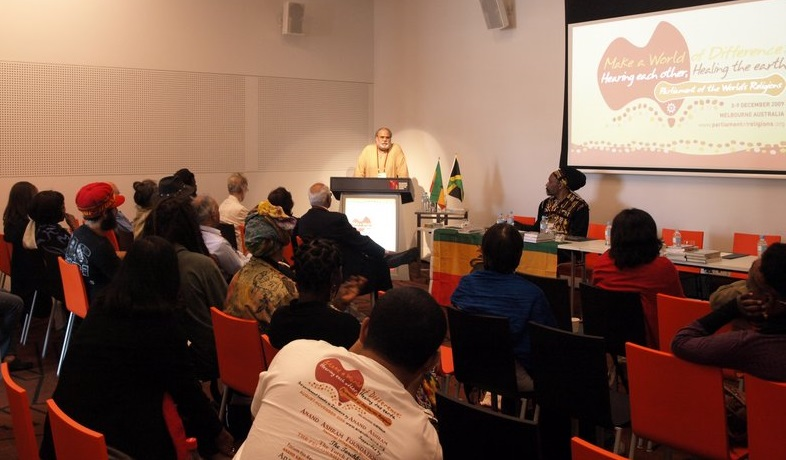
Anand Krishna of Indonesia addresses the Parliament of World's Religions in December 2009, Melbourne, Australia

=== Ambassador of Parliament of the World’s Religions ===
Anand addressed the Parliament of the World’s Religions in Melbourne, Australia, at a forum held over 3–9 December 2009. His speech was titled "Addressing Religious Radicalism in Indonesia: Appreciating and Cultivating Bhinneka Tunggal Ika (Unity in Diversity) and Pancasila (Indonesia’s Preambule)". He was appointed Ambassador of the Parliament of the World’s Religions Council in September 2009.

== Selected works ==
Anand Krishna's books and audiobooks include:

In English

- Anand Krishna, Life – A Traveler’s Guide to Journey Within (Gramedia Pustaka Utama) 2003 ISBN 979-22-0157-2
- Anand Krishna, Soul Quest – Journey from Death to Immortality (Gramedia Pustaka Utama) 2003 ISBN 979-22-0153-X
- Anand Krishna, "Voice of Indonesia" (AK Global Co-Operation) 2007 ISBN 978-979-16787-0-4
- Anand Krishna, "Christ of Kasmiri – The Incredible Saga of Sage Yuzu Asaph" (AK Global Co-Operation) July 2008 ISBN 978-979-16787-3-5
- Anand Krishna, "Tri Hita Karana : Ancient Balinese Wisdom for Neo Humans" (AK Global Co-Operation) 2008 ISBN 978-979-16787-5-9
- Anand Krishna, "Sufi Solution to World’s Problems" (AK Global Co-Operation) 2008 ISBN 978-979-16787-4-2
- Anand Krishna, "From Bali to Belo Horizonte – In Pursuit of the Indigenous Wisdom of Sundaland and South America to Save Our Planet" (AK Global Co-Operation) 2009 ISBN 978-979-16787-7-3
- Anand Krishna, "One Earth One Sky One Humankind – Living Prayerfully in the Spirit of Unity in Diversity" (Gramedia Pustaka Utama) 2009 ISBN 978-979-22512-6-5
- Anand Krishna, "The Hanuman Factor : Life Lessons from the Most Successful Spiritual CEO" (Gramedia Pustaka Utama) 2010 ISBN 978-979-22-5296-5
- Anand Krishna, "The Wisdom of Bali : The Sacred Science of Celebrating Heaven on Earth" (Gramedia Pustaka Utama) January 2010 ISBN 978-979-22-6318-3
- Anand Krishna, "The Zen Yoga : An Integral Approach to Spirituality" (Parimal Publication India) 2011 ISBN 978-81-7110-373-7
- Anand Krishna, "Sai Anand Gita: Lord’s Song of Bliss Eternal" (Sri Sathya Sai Books and AK Global Co-Operation) Nov 2011 ISBN 978-602-95405-5-0
- Anand Krishna, "Guru Yoga : The Way Within" (AK Global Co-Operation) January 2012 ISBN 978-602-95405-6-7
- Anand Krishna. "The Wisdom of Sundaland : The Ancient Unrecorded Prehistory of Indonesia Archipelago" (Gramedia Pustaka Utama) 2012 ISBN 978-979-22-8657-1
- Anand Krishna, "The Kaligis Success Factor, Lesson from a rare Man of Law" (Gramedia Pustaka Utama) 2013 ISBN 978-979-22-9944-1
- Anand Krishna, "Dvipantara Dharma Sastra : Sara Samuccaya-Slokantara-Sevaka Dharma, Ancient Indonesian Wisdom for Modern Human" (Centre of Vedic and Dharmic Studies) May 2015 ISBN 978-602-17679-4-8
- Anand Krishna, "Live Yoga : The Yoga Sutras of Patanjali for Modern Times" (Gramedia Pustaka Utama) 2015 ISBN 978-602-03-1529-4
