= Emilia Contessa =

Indonesian pop singer and actress (1957–2025)

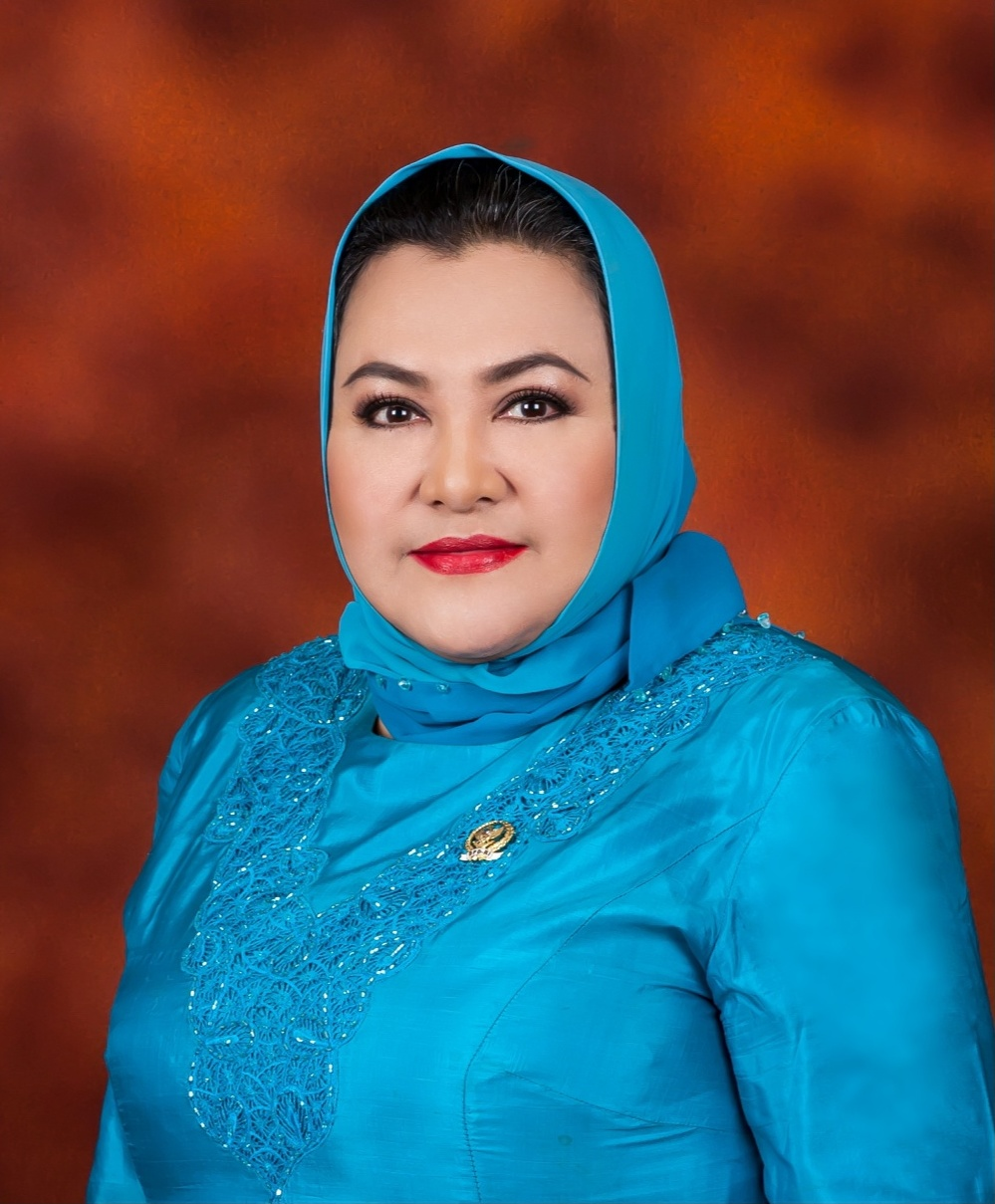
- Hj. Emilia Contessa as a Member of the Regional Representative Council of the Republic of Indonesia, East Java Province for the period 2014–2019
- Born: Nur Indah Cintra Sukma Munsyi; 27 September 1957; Banyuwangi, East Java, Indonesia
- Died: 27 January 2025 (aged 67); Banyuwangi, East Java, Indonesia
- Other name: Emilia Bin Hasan Ali
- Occupations: Singer; actress; politician; model; philanthropist
- Years active: 1969–2025
- Notable work: Akhir Sebuah Impian, Brandal-Brandal Metropolitan, Ratapan Anak Tiri
- Spouses: Rio Tambunan (m. 1976; div. 1983); Abdullah Sidik Sukarty (m. 1988; div. 1992); Ussama Bin Muhammad Al-Hadar (m. 1994)
- Children: Married to Rio Tambunan: Denada Elizabeth Anggia Ayu Tambunan; Enrico Whenry Rizky Tambunan; Married to Abdullah Sidik Sukarty: Muhammad Abdullah Surkaty; Married to Ussama Bin Muhammad Al-Hadar: Kaisar Hadi Haggy Al-Hadar
- Parent(s): Hasan Ali; Anna Suriani
- Musical career
- Genres: Dangdut; Indo pop; Keroncong
- Instrument: Vocals
- Labels: Asia Record; Flower Sound; Musica Studios; Gajah Mada Records

Nur Indah Cintra Sukma Munsyi (27 September 1957 – 27 January 2025), commonly known as Emilia Contessa, was an Indonesian pop singer and actress. She was a member of the Regional Representative Council, representing East Java, from 2014 to 2019.

== Life and career ==
Contessa was born Nur Indah Cintra Sukma Munsyi in Banyuwangi on 27 September 1957 to Anna Suriani, a Javanese mother, and Hasan Ali, a Pakistani-Madurese father. She was the eldest of the couple's three children.

She started singing at five, and her mother became her manager.

Her niece Maharasyi competed in the Voice.

After serving as a member of the Regional Representative Council for the 2014–2019 period, she stood for election for the national parliament on the ticket of the National Mandate Party but was not elected.

Contessa died suddenly at Blambangan Regional Hospital, Banyuwangi, 27 January 2025, after suffering a heart attack resulting from complications of diabetes and hypertension. She had been admitted to the hospital an hour earlier, and died surrounded by her husband, children, and other family members.

== Discography ==
- Repelita (1969)
- Yatim piatu
- Masa Depan
- Sudah Kucoba
- Burung Sangkar
- Katakanlah
- Untuk Apa
- Mimpi Sedih
- Malam Yang Dingin
- Pak Ketipak Ketipung
- Hitam Manis
- Sio Mama
- Penasaran
- Bimbi
- Main Tali
- Kegagalan Cinta
- Penghibur Hati
- Layu Sebelum Berkembang
- Setangkai Bunga Anggrek
- Nasib Pengembara
- Samudera Shalawat

== Filmography ==
- Brandal-Brandal Metropolitan (1971)
- Tanah Gersang (1971)
- Dalam Sinar Matanya (1972)
- Pelangi di Langit Singosari (1972)
- Perkawinan (1972)
- Takkan Kulepaskan (1972)
- Dosa di Atas Dosa (1973)
- Akhir Sebuah Impian (1973)
- Tokoh (1973)
- Perempuan (1973)
- Aku Mau Hidup (1974)
- Calon Sarjana (1974)
- Pilih Menantu (1974)
- Ratapan Anak Tiri (1974)
- Tangisan Ibu Tiri (1974)
- Tetesan Air Mata Ibu (1974)
- Benyamin Raja Lenong (1975)
- Senja di Pantai Losari (1975)
- Memble Tapi Kece (1986)
