= D. Kumaraswamy =

Duraisamy Kumaraswamy துரைசாமி குமாரசாமி
- Born: 3 November 1906; Kelantan, Malaysia
- Died: 29 May 1972; Medan, Indonesia
- Occupation: exporter
- Known for: Reforming Hindu society among Indian Indonesians

Kumaraswamy s/o Duraisamy Pillay (11 March 1906 – 29 May 1972) was a Hindu reformer and Tamil community leader in Indonesia. He started the Deli Hindu Sabah, the Indian Boy Scout Association and many other projects benefitting the Hindu Tamil communities of Medan. He died in May 1972 in Medan.

== Sources ==
- A Mani, Kernial Singh Sandhu. Indian Communities in Southeast Asia. Institute of Southeast Asian Studies, 2006. ISBN 981-230-418-5
