= Sikhism in Indonesia =

Sikhism in Indonesia Sikhisme di Indonesia
- Pasar Baru Sikh Temple in Jakarta, 2025

Total population
- 10,000-15,000

Regions with significant populations
- Jakarta · Medan

Religions
- Sikhism

Languages
- Punjabi • Indonesian • Dutch

Sikhism in Indonesia (Indonesian: Sikhisme di Indonesia) is a small religious minority in Indonesia. There are about 10,000 to 15,000 Sikhs in Indonesia. However, despite the presence of Sikhs in the country, the religion is not officially recognized by the Indonesian government.

== History ==
=== Pre-colonial ===
Local Indonesian-Sikh folklore claims Guru Nanak visited the island of Sumatra during his Udasis (travels), yet there is no evidence to support this myth. This Sikh tale believes Guru Nanak visited Sumatra via Sri Lanka and the Andaman Islands.

A record dated to 1828 from the Hakka Chinese state, the Langfang Republic, located in western Borneo, contains an account of "two turbanned and black-bearded Indians", named Nancha Singh and Mika Singh, who were Sikh advisors to the state's army leader about the prospect of recruiting men from India to combat the encroaching Dutch colonists.

=== Colonial ===
A record from 1836 records a man with the surname of McCoy recruiting 50 Sikh workers for his sugar plantation in Australia, with the group stopping in Batavia (modern-day Jakarta) en route to their destination.

Sikh settlement in the Malay Archipelago began in the late 1870s. Sumatra, specifically Aceh, acted as a gateway to Sikh settlement and migration across the Indonesian archipelago. The early Sikh settlers to Sumatra arrived via the Malayan post of Penang, with a minority possibly coming from the Andaman Islands. Sikh settlement in Sumatra dates back to the 1870s. In the early years, the Sikh population of Sumatra would have been a few hundred people until the early 1880s, whereafter it was bolstered with fresh numbers by young, male Sikh arrivals from the Straits Settlements.

According to academics K. S. Sandhu and A. Mani, the early Sikh migrants to Sumatra consisted of unmarried men who worked for six to seven years before returning to the Punjab to get married. After being wed, these men would come back to Sumatra and work towards bringing their family over.

The early Sikh migrants to Sumatra may have been partially motivated by Sikh tales of Guru Nanak visiting the island. The early Sikhs who settled in northern Sumatra in the late 19th century originated from the Jalandhar and Amritsar areas of the Majha and Doaba regions of the Punjab. These early Sikh arrivals came as traders and gradually scattered throughout northern Sumatra. Sumatran Sikhs of the time also were engaged in the dairy, security, and taxi industries, later branching out to business, trading, sports equipment manufacturing, and textile sectors later-on. Some of the Sumatran Sikh pioneers worked in tobacco and rubber plantations. By the late 19th century, a Medan branch of the De Javasche Bank was established, with Sikhs working as security guards at it. They would be followed by Sikhs seeking work as watchmen. Stories of Sikh success and opportunities in Sumatra made their way back to the Punjab, which encouraged further Sikh migration to the island by prospective Sikhs.

Sikhs also arrived to work in the police and as soldiers. Some of these Sikh troops were sent to assist the Dutch colonial government in-suppressing native revolts. However, some of these Sikhs began sympathizing with the local Indonesians and switched their allegiance to the native rebels and engaged in anti-colonial activities such as taking over Dutch ships. Many of the Sikh soldiers settled on the island of Sumatra.

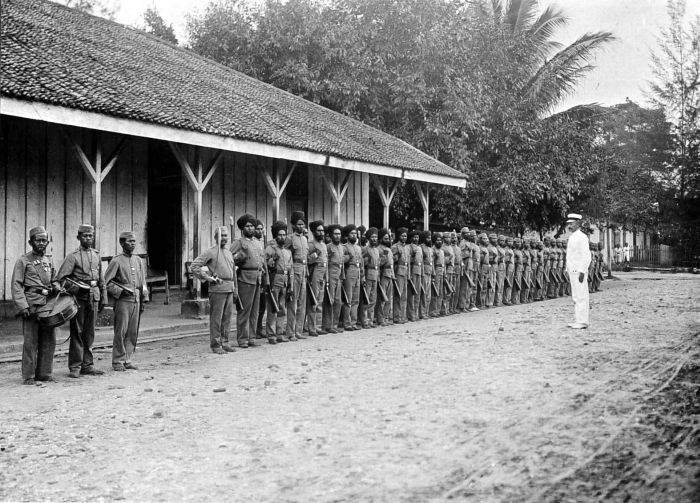
Police officers of the Royal Dutch East Indies Army (including Sikhs) in Pangkalan Brandan, Sumatra, ca.1907–1945

In 1894, British colonial authorities of the Straits Settlements (present-day Malaysia and Singapore), writing to the equivalent authorities in British India, were alarmed by a new immigration trend of an increasing number of Sikhs, whom after arriving in the colony, applied for certificates under Section 11 of [the Straits Immigration] Ordinance V of 1884, which allowed the holder to leave the colony to seek employment elsewhere. Sikhs in the Straits Settlements who successfully were granted this certificate migrated further on to areas like Sumatra, Borneo, and Siam. After arriving, they tended to work in the police force or as watchmen. The British authorities, whilst admitting this had been going on for some years, decried this increasing trend as of late and wished to bring an end to it. The British were against its Sikh subjects leaving for regions in the Dutch East Indies, under the control of the Dutch, as they viewed the Dutch as rivals, and also to areas colonized by the French. The Dutch readily paid better salaries to Sikh police and military recruits compared to the British, which worried the British at the time.

Our requirements of Sikhs for our own army are already very sensibly affected by the competition of our own Colonial forces and the question of restricting the enlistment of Sikhs in some way in these forces has been under consideration, and now it appears that a new field is open to them. ... But putting aside this consideration, it is submitted that it would be impolitic to permit any classes from this country (Sikhs or others) to take service in the civil or military forces of another nation – if they go to Sumatra and Borneo, they can find their way to Annam and Tonquin and take service with the French.

— H. B. W. (British official), 1894 memo to the Adjutant-General in India

Despite wishing to stop Sikh migration to Dutch colonies in the East Indies, the British gave-up as even if they barred Sikhs from obtaining the certificates under the 1884 Ordinance, the Sikhs would still find a way to Dutch-controlled territory.

By 1900–1910, many Sikhs had migrated from Sumatra to other areas of Indonesia, such as Jakarta and Surabaya, where they developed and diversified their economic prowess further. There were around 80–100 Sikh families residing in the Tandjung area of Jakarta and around 40 Sikh families residing in Surabaya. Less affluent Sikhs of Tandjung at the time worked as security watchmen, such as on the harbour, or as labourers for British shipping firms, whilst those who were wealthy worked as money-lenders. The affluent Sikhs owned horse-carts, which they rented to native Indonesians for the purpose of being used as taxis. Other Sikhs worked as clerks and salesmen in Sikh shops. Whilst Sikh settlers who established themselves in northern Sumatra mostly originated from northern Punjab, the Sikh pioneers of Batavia tended to come from eastern Punjab.

Indonesian-Sikhs established sports companies, such as Bir & Co., Nahar Sports, and Hari Brothers, to serve the needs of the Dutch colonists who needed sports equipment. With increased demand for sports equipment, many Sikh migrants from Sumatra were drawn to settle in Batavia to work as labourers. The Rose and Co. company was responsible for bringing over 20 Sikh families to Batavia and Surabaya to work at its local branches. The local Sikh and Sindhi community of Batavia at the time had close relations with each-other.

Around the end of the First World War in 1918, many Sikhs established textile shops, with their garments being sourced from Sindhi firms. By 1920, the Sikh population in Medan and Binjai had risen to a level where the construction of Sikh gurdwaras was now warranted. Medan would become a prominent cultural and economic centre of Sikhism in Southeast Asia. In Medan, the Sikh settlers replicated the lifestyles they had back in their Punjabi homeland, with characteristic animal husbandry (cattle rearing and dairy farming) and by being family-orientated.

The Sikh population of Java expanded when two British firms began bringing over Sikhs to work as security men and watchmen. In 1925, the first gurdwara of Jakarta was established at the main harbour of Tanjung Priok in northern Jakarta to cater to the local Sikh population. Sindhi housewives were the readers of the Sikh scripture during festivities at the Tanjung Priok gurdwara.

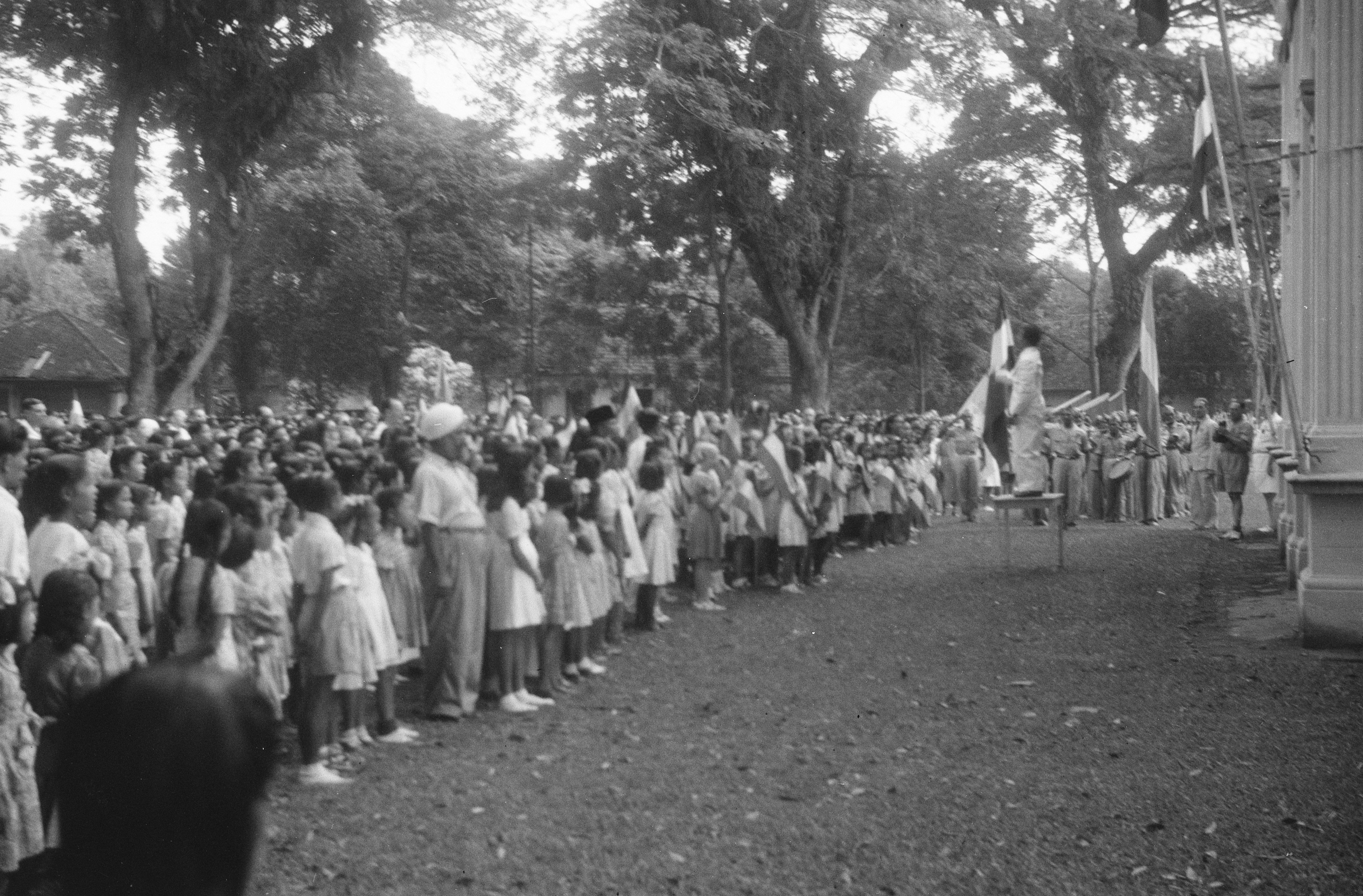
Celebration of the 50th anniversary of Queen Wilhelmina's reign, Medan, 31 August 1948. A Sikh man wearing a white turban can be seen in the front row of the crowd.

In Medan, many Sikhs resided in the Kampung Keling area early-on but eventually began to move to more affluent neighbourhoods of the city. Many of the early Sikh settlers of Medan were in the dairy farming industry to meet the local demand for dairy products. In 1925, both a gurdwara and G.P.C. Khalsa High School (with English as the medium of instruction) was established in Medan. The first headmaster of the Medan Khalsa High School was sirdar Bahadur Singh. Many prominent Indonesian-Sikhs were graduates of the Medan Khalsa High School, such as Thakur Singh, Partap Singh Raniwala, Gurnam Singh, and H. S. Dillon. H. S. Dillon later became the Secretary of Agriculture of Indonesia. The Khalsa School did not only have Sikh pupils, many native Sumatran children attended it as their families hoped they could become proficient in the English-language as a result. By the 1930s, there were around 5,000 Punjabi Sikhs in Sumatra. A source from 1930 describes how Sikh women also arrived in considerable numbers and makes an observation of them donning nose rings and distinctive clothing.

During World War 2, the Sikh community of Sumatra did not flee the island and were joined by the Indian National Army (INA), which was propped-up by the Japanese. Many Indonesian Sikhs served in the INA, which had a local garrison headquartered at garrison Medan Aerodrome, Sumatra. Indonesian-Sikhs prospered during the Japanese occupation as they received many contracts with the Japanese Army and Navy. Many Sikh soldiers fought on the side of the Allies against the Japanese in Indonesia. Sikh soldiers liberated thousands of European captives held by the Japanese. The area of Tjideng camp where Ben Bot was incarcerated was liberated by Sikh soldiers. After the war, general Mohan Singh, a prominent figure of the INA, was interned for several months on either Selat Panjang or Bengkalis off the coast of Sumatra. Some Allied forces Sikh regiments stayed in Sumatra for up to year after the end of the war.

During the Japanese retreat, the Sikh soldiers were instructed to hold their lines until the Dutch could reestablish control over their former colony. Many Sikhs went against this order and instead allied with Indonesian rebels.

With the end of the war and withdrawal of the Japanese, the local Sikh community faced insecurities. An incident occurred in western Java, where deserters of the British Indian Army, allegedly Muslims, massacred 25 Indians, including some Sikhs, as part of "revenge acts". As a result of their uncertainty, local Sikhs began to shift to the Dutch enclave of Pasar Baru in Jakarta for their security. After independence of Indonesia, the properties vacated by the Dutch in Pasar Baru fell into Indian, mostly Sikh, possession.

During the Indonesian National Revolution, many Sikh soldiers protected Dutch civilians from being lynched by native mobs. Most Sikhs supported the Indonesian revolutionaries against the European colonists. The Sikhs had been disillusioned from supporting both the Dutch and Japanese due to the violence they inflicted on the local Indonesian population. Many Sikhs participated in the Indonesian war of independence on the side of the Indonesian fighters.

Due to the ongoing partition of India, many Sikhs could not return to the Indian subcontinent.

=== Present (post-1949) ===
After the Dutch transferred sovereignty to the United States of Indonesia, the vast majority of local Sikhs decided to remain in the archipelago. Jakarta was established as the capital city of the new state, which attracted a new wave of Sikh migrants across Indonesia to it.

In June 1953, the Gurdwara Sri Guru Arjan Dev Ji was established in Medan to serve as the central temple to serve the Medanese Sikh community. In 1955, a new gurdwara building was constructed in Medan.

Whilst a gurdwara had already been established at Tanjung Priok in 1925, the Sikh community felt that it was it was inconvenient for congregants from central Jakarta to visit the temple in Tanjung Priok located in northern Jakarta every Sunday for religious services. Thus, a new gurdwara, the Pasar Baru Gurdwara, was built in 1954 at Pasar Baru, where most of the Sikh population resided. The construction of the Pasar Baru Gurdwara was assisted by Sindhi businessmen.

In the 1950s, many of the Sikh-founded sports good companies from the colonial-era still remained, such as Bir & Co; Rose & Co.; Rattan Sports; Sporting House; and Seth & Co. These companies carried-on with recruiting Sikh youth from the Punjab for work. Some of these sporting goods companies have since grown larger and become regional companies that are well known to the Indonesian public.

During the latter part of Soekarno's rule, India-Indonesian relations were at a low-point and thus local Sikhs had to keep a low-profile. Local Sikh leader Pritam Singh, who had participated in both the Indian Independence League and Indonesian independence movement, worked with the Indonesian military and civil authorities at the time as a representative of the local Indian community to address any misunderstandings. Due to Pritam Singh's activism, expatriate Indians were granted Indonesian citizenship in 1965.

In the 1990s, internal conflicts within the Sikh community led to the Khalsa School Medan's closure.

Between 25 and 27 January 2010, the World Sikh Council – America Region (WSC-AR) participated in US-Indonesia bilateral interfaith conference in Jakarta sponsored by the governments of both countries. The Sikhs were represented by Tarunjit Singh Butalia, chairperson of WSC-AR's Interfaith Committee.

In 2010, there were an estimated ~1,000 Sikhs residing in northern Sumatra. Many of the Sikhs of northern Sumatra work in business, merchant, and cow-breeding fields.

In 2015, the Supreme Council for the Sikh Religion in Indonesia was founded.

In 2017, it was reported that the overall Sikh population of the island of Sumatra was around ~5,000. However, this figure is questioned as Sikhs are subsumed as "Hindus" legally, since Sikhism is not an officially-recognized religion by the Indonesian government. There are around nine gurdwaras located across Sumatra (seven in northern Sumatra) in Pematang Siantar, Palembang, and several other localities in the vicinity of Medan. In northern Sumatra, Sikhs can be found in Binjai, Sibolga, Tadjung Balai, Permantang Siantar, and Tebing Tinggi.

In 2017, Sikh population of Jakarta was also reported to be ~5,000. The major Sikh temples of Jakarta are the Yayasan Sikh Gurdwara Mission, Pasar Baru, Sikh Temple, Antara Jakarta, Sikh Temple, Tanjung Priok and Gurudwara Guru Nanak Tanggerang Selatan.

Modern Medanese-Sikhs reportedly speak Bahasa Indonesia with a unique accent. The Indian Consulate located in Medan coordinates with the local Sikh temples to commemorate religious events, such as the 550th Guru Nanak Gurpurab celebrations at the GPC Khalsa Gurudwara in November 2019.

The Indonesian Sikh community has forged close-ties with the local Sindhi Hindu community as the Sindhis also believe in the sanctity of the Guru Granth Sahib and the Sikh gurus but the two groups still maintain separate identities ultimately. Indonesian-Sikhs are sometimes conflated and misidentified as "Bengalis", similar to a phenomenon found in Malaysia and Singapore and in pre-war publications.

Sikhism is not one of Indonesia's officially-recognized religions. Sikhs are currently classified as part of the larger Hindu community by the Indonesian government. Sikhs are socially considered a non-indigenous people. The Sikh population of modern Indonesia may consist of up to 35,000 but it is difficult to accurately affirm any population figure, as the Indonesian government doesn't record Sikhs as a separate ethnic group due to the lack of official recognition of the religion.

== Gurdwaras ==
- Tanjung Priok Gurdwara – founded by Prasant Singh, Partap Singh, Dasunder Singh and Ajura Singh in 1925 with a giani being brought over from India. Sindhi women played important roles in the early history of the temple.
- Yayasan Missi Gurdwara Medan – constructed in the 1930s and later upscaled with the support of the provincial government. This temple is associated with many charitable, health, and social activities.
- Gurdwara Sri Guru Arjan Dev Ji, Medan – the gurdwara was originally a small structure after its establishment in June 1953 but has since expanded to meet the needs of the growing Sikh congregation.
- Guru Nanak Devji Gurdwara, Pematangsiantar - the gurdwara was founded in 1919 by the local Sikh community, which makes it, if not. The oldest Gurdwara in Indonesia.
- Pasar Baru Gurdwara – founded by Pritam Singh, Karam Singh, Avtar Singh, Shiv Singh, Ajit Singh, Tarlok Singh, Partap Singh, Kulwant Singh, Harchand Singh, along with Sindhi businessmen of Pasar Baru, R. L. Seth and G. L. Vohra, in 1954. The Tanjung Priok Gurdwara assisted with the establishment of the gurdwara by donating 50,000 rupiah to the cause. It has become the largest Sikh temple of Jakarta.
- Gurdwara Guru Nanak – founded by three Sikhs named Hardjan Singh Bhuller, Charanjit Singh Mesampur and Balwant Singh Rahal and originally located at Jalan Johari No.2, South Jakarta. In 2001, the gurdwara shifted from its original location to Jalan Merpati, Ciputat Tangerang Selatan. On an adjacent piece of vacant land, an international school from kindergarten to junior high school, was established as a joint venture by the gurdwara. The overall complex measures 12,000 square metres and has sport facilities.

== Prominent Indonesian Sikhs ==
- Balwant Singh Rahal, Activist, Social volunteer and co-founder of the Gurdwara Guru Nanak in South Jakarta
- Binder Singh, Football commentator and observer
- Gurnam Singh (runner), Indonesian athlete, won three gold medals in the 1962 Asian Games in athletics.
- H. S. Dillon, Politician and Economist

== See also ==
- Jainism in Southeast Asia
- Hinduism in Southeast Asia
