= Times of Indonesia =

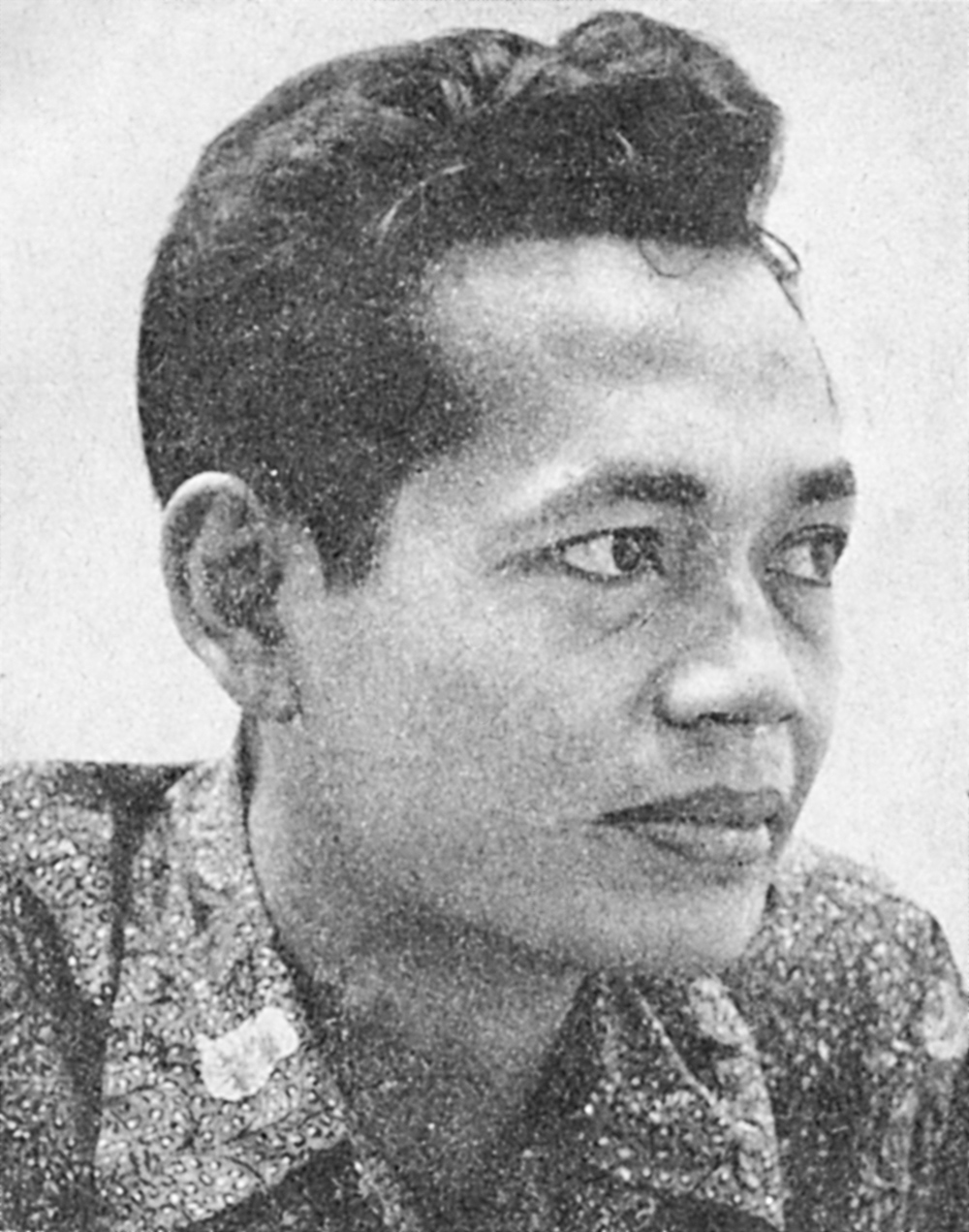
Mochtar Lubis (founding editor of the Times), in 1955.

The Times of Indonesia was a daily English newspaper published in Jakarta, Indonesia. Founded in 1952, it was the first English daily newspaper in Indonesia. The founding editor was Mochtar Lubis, who was also the editor of Indonesia Raya at the time. Mochtar Lubis had close links to the army leadership. In 1953, Lubis stepped down from his position due to the stresses of his simultaneous editorship of Indonesia Raya. Charles Tambu, from Ceylon (present-day Sri Lanka), took over as managing editor of the newspaper.

In the aftermath of the Revolutionary Government of the Republic of Indonesia revolt, the publishing license of "The Times of Indonesia" was revoked on October 31, 1960. The publication of the newspaper was thus discontinued. Times of Indonesia later switched to Indonesian Times in the later years in actual Indonesian language.
