= Hasan Ali (activist) =

Indonesian artist and activist (1933–2010)

Member of Banyuwangi DPRD
- In office 1955–1966
- Parliamentary group: PNI – Artists

Personal details
- Born: 7 December 1933 Banyuwangi, Dutch East Indies
- Died: 14 June 2010 (aged 76) Banyuwangi, East Java, Indonesia
- Known for: Promotion of Osing language

Hasan Ali (7 December 1933 – 14 June 2010) was an Indonesian artist and language activist from Banyuwangi Regency, East Java. He is best known for his promotion of the Osing language, considering it as a separate language from Javanese and advocating for its adoption in Banyuwangi. He published a dictionary for the language in 2002.

== Early life ==
Hasan Ali was born on 7 December 1933 in the village of Mangir, in what is today Rogojampir district of Banyuwangi Regency. He was of mixed Madurese–Osing–Pakistani descent. He completed his highschool in 1956 in Malang, and studied law at Brawijaya University there. Due to lack of funds, he did not complete his law degree.

== Career ==
At age 15, Ali had founded a performing arts group which performed the story of Damar Wulan. He was appointed to the municipal council (DPRD) of the regency as an artists' representative within the Indonesian National Party, serving between 1955 and 1966. Early in the Suharto period, following a request by the local government to Ali to help preserve the local culture, Ali documented Banyuwangi's local traditional music in cassette form. He also starred in the 1971 movie Tanah Gersang by Mochtar Lubis, and later became head of the Blambangan Arts Council.

Ali began work on an Osing–Indonesian dictionary in 1978, initially collecting vocabulary from day-to-day conversations in Banyuwangi and in migrant Osing communities nearby. At the time, the language was commonly identified as a dialect of Javanese instead of being its own language. He compiled the dictionary on a typewriter, though he later received a computer as a grant from Japan's Toyota Foundation through a researcher's recommendation. Throughout the 1980s, Ali published a number of works on the Osing language. He advocated for the Osing language to be incorporated into textbooks and for the language to be formally codified.

After Ali's participation in the Javanese Language Congresses in 1991 and 1996, where he advocated Osing language education, the Ministry of Education and Culture approved the inclusion of Osing in Banyuwangi's school curriculums. In the 1996 congress, Ali used seven sentences in Osing which were nonintelligible with Javanese to support his claim of the languages' separation. He completed his dictionary and published it in 2002, containing around 30 thousand words. The dictionary was printed three times, and Ali distributed half of the copies to schools and government offices. He further published educational books on Osing.

== Family and death ==
Ali had four children and ten grandchildren from his marriage to Anna Susiani. Their eldest daughter, Nur Indah Cintra Sukma Munsyi (better known as Emilia Contessa), became a nationally famous singer, actress, and a senator. Ali died on 14 June 2010 at Fatimah Islamic Hospital in Banyuwangi due to diabetes and hypertension.
