= Charles Tambu =

Indonesian diplomat

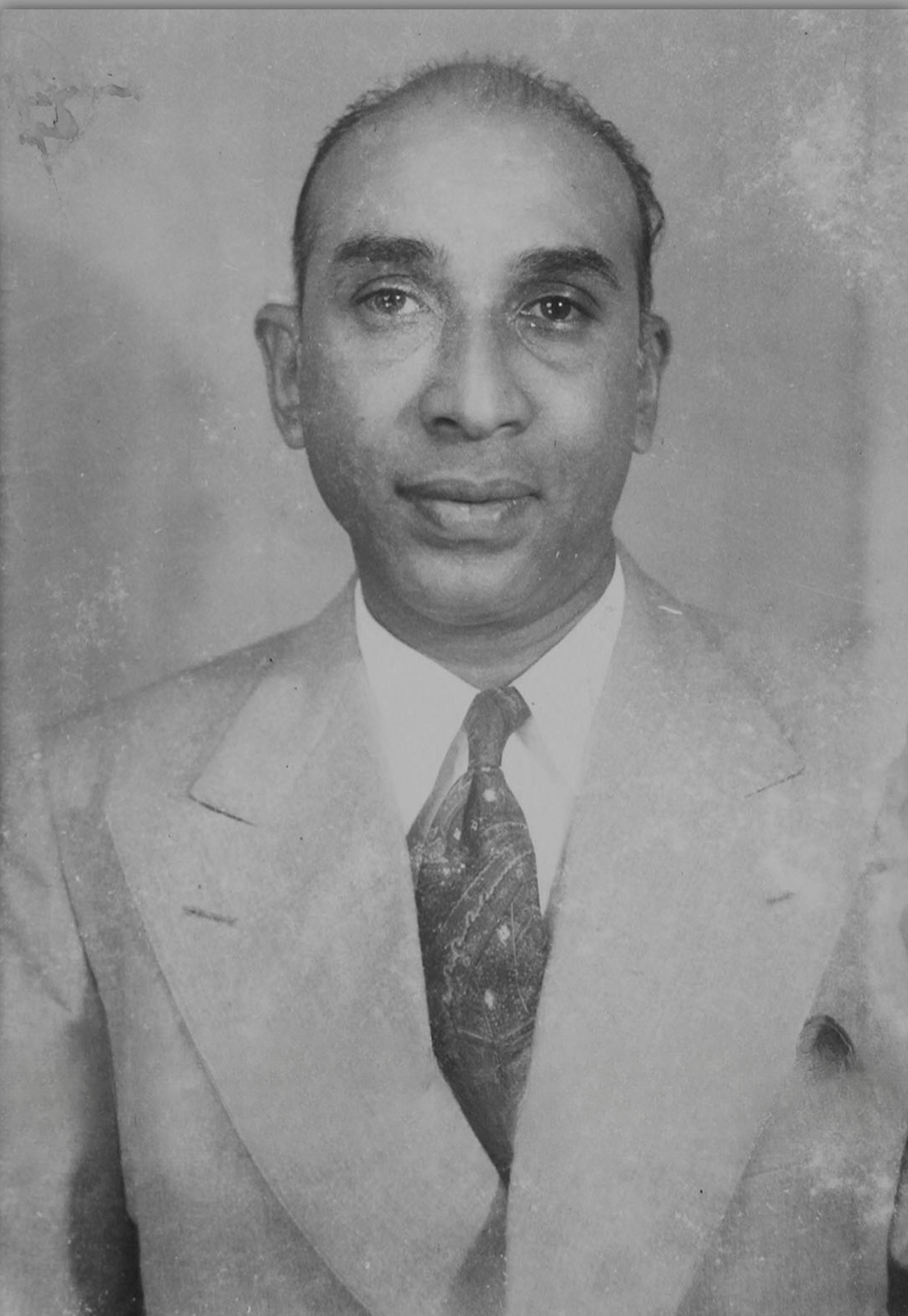
- Official portrait, 1953
- Born: 1907; British Ceylon (today Sri Lanka)
- Died: 1965 (aged 57–58); Kuala Lumpur, Malaysia
- Occupations: Politician, diplomat

Charles Tambu (1907-1965) was a representative of the Indonesian government in international diplomacy even though he was not a native Indonesian by descent. He is best known for being one of Indonesia's representatives at the UN security session held on August 14, 1947, together with Soedjatmoko, Soemitro Djojohadikusumo, Sutan Sjahrir, H. Agus Salim, and L. N. Palar.

== Biography ==
According to various literacies, Charles Tambu was born in 1907 in British Ceylon (today Sri Lanka). Tambu was of Tamil descent. He went to the Dutch East Indies, joining his father and mother who migrated in search of a better life. Although he is not a native Indonesian, he represented Indonesia in various international forums.

An article in the Merdeka magazine entitled "Charles Tambu: Turunan Asing Tapi Djiwanya Indonesia", (No. 43, th. II, October 22, 1949) mentions Charles Tambu, a former illegal immigrant from Sri Lanka, who steadfastly and sincerely defended Indonesian sovereignty at the United Nations in 1947.

Tambu's struggle at the United Nations to defend the newly independent Indonesian government on August 17, 1945, resulted in the awarding of an Indonesian passport from President Sukarno. After the recognition of Indonesian sovereignty by the Dutch in 1949, Tambu was appointed by President Sukarno to be the Indonesian Consul General in Manila until 1953.

After his stint as Indonesia's Consul General to Manila, Tambu returned to Indonesia and took up the appointment as editor-in-chief of the country's first English-language newspaper, the Times of Indonesia. Tambu’s former co-worker Mochtar Lubis was instrumental in setting up this newspaper in 1952 and was himself the editor-in-chief of Indonesia Raya.

However, following the PRRI/Permesta affair, a rebel movement in Indonesia, both newspapers were deemed unfit for publication. After that, life became more challenging for Tambu and he disappeared from historical records. He is known to have later relocated to Kuala Lumpur, where he remained until his death in 1965.

== Gallery ==
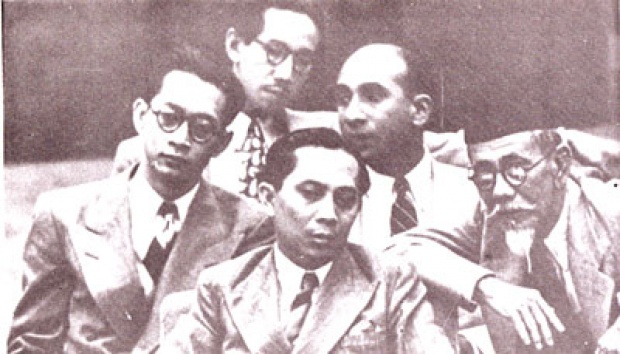
Charles Tambu at the UN Security Council session at Lake Sukses 1947. (Charles Tambu is next to Sumitro Djojohadikusumo)

Charles Tambu as Indonesian Consul in Manila.
