= Osing language =

Language of the Osing people of East Java, Indonesia

Osing Basa Using ꦧꦱꦲꦸꦱꦶꦁ
- Native to: Indonesia
- Region: East Java; Banyuwangi Regency; Jember Regency; Panti; Wuluhan
- Ethnicity: Osing people
- Native speakers: (300,000 cited 2000 census)
- Language family: Austronesian: Malayo-Polynesian; Javanese; Osing Basa Using ꦧꦱꦲꦸꦱꦶꦁ
- Writing system: Javanese script and Latin; Pegon script (historical)

Language codes
- ISO 639-3: osi
- Glottolog: osin1237
- Areas where Osing is spoken by a majority of the population Areas where Osing is spoken by a significant minority of the population

An Osing speaker, recorded in Indonesia

The Osing language (Osing: Basa Using; Indonesian: Bahasa Osing), locally known as basa Banyuwangi, is the Modern Javanese dialect of the Osing people of East Java, Indonesia. The Osing dialect uses a special diphthongization (changing the vowel [i] to [ai] and the vowel [u] to [au]) which is not found in any Other Javanese dialects. They are primarily distributed in Banyuwangi Regency, but can also be found in the eastern part of Jember Regency, particularly in districts of Panti and Wuluhan.

Some Osing words have the infix /-y-/ 'ngumbyah', 'kidyang', which are pronounced /ngumbah/ and /kidang/ in standard Javanese, respectively.

A dictionary of the language was published in 2002 by Hasan Ali, an advocate for the language's use in Banyuwangi.

== Vocabulary ==
Divergent Osing vocabulary includes:

- osing/sing 'not' (standard Javanese: ora)
- paran 'what' (standard Javanese: åpå Paran in standard Javanese mean existing)
- kadhung 'if" (standard Javanese: yèn, lèk, nèk, dhonge)
- kelendhi 'how' (standard Javanese: kepiyè, piyè)
- maning 'again' (standard Javanese: manèh, the Banyumasan dialect and some Gresik of Javanese also uses 'maning')
- isun 'I/me' (standard Javanese: aku, Lamongan and Gresik sometimes also uses 'esun')
- rikå 'you' (standard Javanese: kowè, the Banyumasan dialect also uses "rikå")
- ring/nong 'in/at/on' (standard Javanese: ning, nang, Malang also uses 'nong', the Balinese language and Old Javanese also uses "ring")
- masiyå/ambèknå 'even if'/'although' (standard Javanese: senadyan, senajan, najan, the Arekan dialect of Javanese also uses 'masiyå' / ambekna )
