= H. S. Dillon =

Indonesian politician (1945–2019)

H.S. Dillon
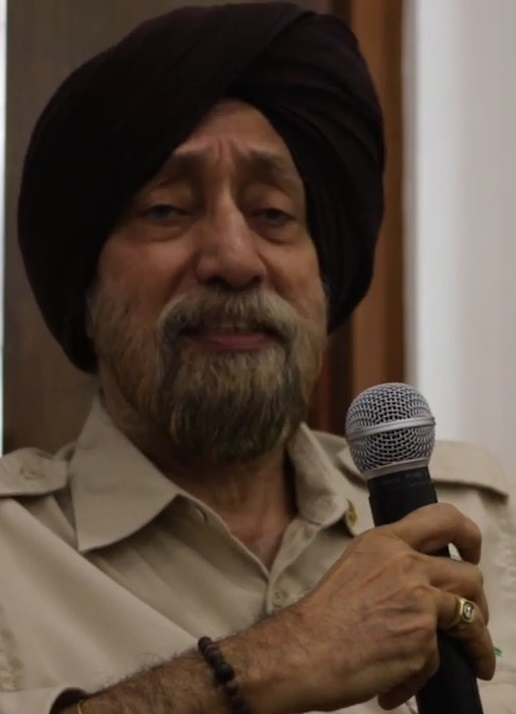
- Born: Harbrinderjit Singh Dillon; 23 April 1945; Medan, Indonesia
- Died: 16 September 2019 (aged 74); Kuta, Indonesia
- Education: Universitas Sumatera Utara; Cornell University
- Spouse(s): Dr. Drupadi Kaur Harnopidjati Dhillon, Ph.D
- Children: Ir. Haryasetyaka Singh Dillon, MA. PhD; Ir. Mahawira Singh Dillon, MA; Mahareksha Singh Dillon, SH.LLM

Harbrinderjit Singh Dillon (23 April 1945 – 16 September 2019) was an Indonesian Sikh who occupied a variety of positions in Indonesian political life, including assistant to the Minister of Agriculture, and Commissioner of the National Commission on Human Rights). His positions included executive director of Partnership Governance Reform in Indonesia. He was an outspoken critic of corruption in Indonesia.

H.S. Dillon was also the founder of The Foundation for International Human Rights Reporting Standards (FIHRRST), an international association dedicated to respecting, protecting and fulfilling human rights. Dillon was joined by a group of internationally respected human rights advocates (among others, Marzuki Darusman, Marzuki Usman, Makarim Wibisono, James Kallman, Dradjad Hari Wibowo) to establish the organization, which develops and promotes standards by which adherence to human rights principles can be demonstrated.

He studied at Cornell University in the United States, earning his PhD in agricultural economics and studying international trade and development, resource management, and developmental sociology.

== Bibliography ==
- H. S. Dillon and Marcellus Rantetana, Food Security in Indonesia, (Chapter 4 in Vijay S Vyas, Food Security in Asian Countries, 2005 ISBN 8171884563 )
- see HS Dillon, a fearless campaigner which lists several publications.
