= Gurnam Singh (runner) =

Indonesian athlete

Personal information
- Born: August 16, 1931 Punjab, British Raj
- Died: December 7, 2006 (aged 75) Jakarta, Indonesia

Sport
- Sport: Track and field
Medal record
Men's athletics
Representing Indonesia
Asian Games
Bronze medal – third place	1962 Jakarta	10,000 m

Gurnam Singh (August 16, 1931 – December 7, 2006) was a former Indonesian track and field athlete who won a bronze medal in the 10,000 meters at 1962 Asian Games in Jakarta. Rusli Lutan described him as "remembered as a unique runner who ran bare-footed."

== Career ==
Gurnam Singh's involvement in track and field began in the early 1950s within the Indonesian athletics scene, particularly through local sports activities in Medan, North Sumatra. His entry into the sport was marked by participation in preparations for the third National Sports Week held in Medan from September 20 to 27, 1953, where he trained for long-distance running events amid his odd jobs to support his livelihood. This local engagement highlighted his emerging talent in endurance running, drawing him into organized athletics under the auspices of Indonesian Athletics Association, the national athletics federation.

By 1956, Singh had established himself in domestic competitions, setting a national record in the 10,000 meters at a meet in Medan with a time of 36:09.0, which ignited a rivalry with fellow runner Ndalip Singh and showcased his potential in middle and long-distance events. He continued to dominate national-level meets, including national championships and subsequent National Sport Week events, progressively improving his records: in 1960, he lowered the 10,000 meters mark to 33:55.0 and then 33:26.9, while matching the 5,000 meters record of 16:24.5; by 1961, he further refined the 10,000 meters to 33:23.6 domestically and 32:50.8 in an open championship in Malaysia, alongside winning the marathon in Medan with a national-best time of 2:44:19.0. These achievements in regional and national competitions, often held in venues like Yogyakarta and Medan, solidified his status as Indonesia's leading long-distance runner during the late 1950s.

Singh's consistent domestic success led to his selection for the Indonesian national team in the early 1960s, representing the country in preparatory international events that built toward Asian-level competition. Notable pre-1962 appearances included the 1961 inter-university championships in Bucharest, where he ran the 5,000 meters in 15:39.4 and 15:32.6, as well as dual meets against Australia and open events in Malaysia, demonstrating his readiness for higher-stakes races under national program. This progression from local training to national team duty underscored his rise through Indonesia's developing athletics infrastructure, supported by community ties and federation scouting.

Gurnam Singh's most notable accomplishment was securing the bronze medal in the men's 10,000 meters at the 1962 Asian Games, held from 24 August to 4 September in Jakarta, Indonesia the first time the nation hosted the multi-sport event. In the final race on 25 August at Senayan Main Stadium, Singh clocked 30:47.2 for third place, trailing India's Tarlok Singh (gold, 30:21.4) and Japan's Teruo Funai (silver, 30:21.6), in a field that highlighted emerging Asian distance running talent amid post-colonial athletic development.
